= List of operas by Étienne Méhul =

This is a list of operas by Étienne Méhul (1763–1817). Aside from La taupe et les papillons, which was never performed, all premieres took place in Paris.

== List ==
Title	Genre	Subdivisions	Libretto	Première date	Theatre
Euphrosine, ou Le tyran corrigé (Euphrosine et Coradin)	comédie mise en musique	5 acts	François Benoît Hoffmann, after Conradin	4 September 1790; revision in 4 acts, 11 September 1790; revision in 3 acts, 31 October 1790; with a new Act 3, 13 August 1791	Comédie-Italienne
Cora (Alonzo et Cora)	opéra	4 acts	Valadier, after Les Incas by Jean-François Marmontel	15 February 1791	Opéra
Stratonice	comédie héroïque	1 act	François Benoît Hoffmann, after De Dea Syria by Lucien and Antiochus (1666) by Thomas Corneille	3 May 1792	Comédie-Italienne
Le jeune sage et le vieux fou	comédie mêlée de musique	1 act	François Benoît Hoffmann	28 March 1793	Salle Favart
Horatius Coclès	opéra	1 act	Antoine-Vincent Arnault	18 February 1794	Opéra
Le congrès des rois (together with H-M Berton, Blasius, Cherubini, Dalayrac, Deshayes, Devienne, Grétry, Jadin, Kreutzer, Solie and Trial.)	comédie mêlée d'ariettes	3 acts	Desmaillot (pseudonym of Antoine-François Ève)	26 February 1794; suspended after second performance, then banned	Opéra-Comique, Salle Favart
Mélidore et Phrosine	drame lyrique	3 acts	Antoine-Vincent Arnault, after the poem Phrosine et Mélidore (1772) by Pierre-Joseph-Justin Bernard	6 May 1794	Opéra-Comique, Salle Favart
Doria, ou La tyrannie détruite	opéra héroïque	3 acts	Gabriel-Marie Legouvé and Charles-Joseph Lœuillard Davrigny	12 March 1795	Comédie-Italienne
La caverne	comédie mise en musique	3 acts	Nicolas-Julien Forgeot, after Gil Blas by Lesage	5 December 1795	Théâtre Favart
Le jeune Henri	comédie mêlée de musique	2 acts	Jean-Nicolas Bouilly	1 May 1797; revision 18 December 1801	Opéra-Comique
Le pont de Lody	fait historique	1 act	Étienne-Joseph-Bernard Delrieu	15 December 1797	Théâtre Feydeau
La taupe et les papillons	comédie lyrique	1 act	Ange-Étienne-Xavier Poisson de La Chabeaussière	composed 1797/98, scheduled for April 1799 but left unperformed	
Adrien	opéra	3 acts	François Benoît Hoffmann, after Adriano in Siria by Metastasio	4 June 1799 (written in 1791)	Opéra
Ariodant	drame mêlé de musique	3 acts	François Benoît Hoffmann, after Orlando Furioso by Ludovico Ariosto	11 October 1799	Salle Favart
Épicure (together with Cherubini)	opéra	3 acts	Charles-Albert Demoustier	14 March 1800	Salle Favart
Bion	comédie mêlée de musique	1 act	François Benoît Hoffmann, after Voyages d’Anténor translated by Étienne-François de Lantier	27 December 1800	Salle Favart
L’irato, ou L’emporté	comédie-parade	1 act	Benoît-Joseph Marsollier des Vivetières	17 February 1801	Salle Favart
Une folie	comédie mêlée de chants	2 acts	Jean-Nicolas Bouilly	5 April 1802	Théâtre Feydeau
Le trésor supposé, ou Le danger d’écouter aux portes	comédie mêlée de musique	1 act	François Benoît Hoffmann	28 July 1802	Théâtre Feydeau
Joanna	opéra	2 acts	From Emma, ou le soupçon by Benoît-Joseph Marsollier des Vivetières	23 November 1802	Théâtre Feydeau
Héléna	opéra	3 acts	Jean-Nicolas Bouilly	1 March 1803	Théâtre Feydeau
Le baiser et la quittance, ou Une aventure de garnison (together with Boieldieu, Kreutzer and Isouard)	opéra bouffon	3 acts	Louis-Benoît Picard, Charles de Longchamps and Joseph-Marie-Armand-Michel Dieulafoy, after Polier de Bottens, L'heureuse gageure	18 June 1803	Théâtre Feydeau
L'heureux malgré lui	opéra bouffon	1 act	Claude Godard d'Aucort de Saint-Just	29 December 1803	Théâtre Feydeau
Les deux aveugles de Tolède	opéra-comique	1 act	Benoît-Joseph Marsollier des Vivetières, after Mille et Une Nuits and his story Les deux aveugles de Bagdad	28 January 1806	Théâtre Feydeau
Uthal	opéra	1 act	Jacques-Maximilien Benjamin Bins de Saint-Victor after "Berrathon" from James Macpherson's Ossian	17 May 1806	Théâtre Feydeau
Gabrielle d’Estrées, ou Les amours d'Henri IV de France	opéra	3 acts	Claude Godard d'Aucort de Saint-Just	28 June 1806	Théâtre Feydeau
Joseph	drame mêlé de chants	3 acts	Alexandre-Vincent Pineux Duval after Genesis chapters 37-47 inspired by the biblical tragedy by Pierre-Marie-François Baour-Lormian, Omasis, ou Joseph en Égypte (1806)	17 February 1807	Théâtre Feydeau
Les amazones, ou La fondation de Thèbes	opéra	3 acts	Victor-Joseph Étienne de Jouy	17 December 1811	Opéra, Salle Richelieu
Le prince troubadour, ou Le grand trompeur des dames	opéra comique	1 act	Alexandre-Vincent Pineux Duval	24 May 1813	Théâtre Feydeau
L'oriflamme (together with Berton, Kreutzer and Paer)	opéra	1 act	Charles-Guillaume Etienne and Pierre-Marie-François Baour-Lormian	1 February 1814	Opéra
La journée aux aventures	opéra comique	3 acts	Pierre-David-Augustin Chapel and Louis Mézières-Miot	16 November 1816	Théâtre Feydeau
Valentine de Milan (music completed by Joseph Daussoigne-Méhul)	drame lyrique	3 acts	Jean-Nicolas Bouilly	28 November 1822	Théâtre Feydeau
