= Le trésor supposé =

- Opéra comique by Étienne Méhul
- Title page of the libretto
- Librettist: François-Benoît Hoffman
- Language: French
- Premiere: 29 July 1802; Opéra-Comique, Paris

Le trésor supposé, ou Le danger d'écouter aux portes (The Supposed Treasure, or The Danger of Eavesdropping) is an opera by the French composer Étienne Méhul. It takes the form of a comédie en prose mêlée de musique (an opéra-comique) in one act. It premiered at the Opéra-Comique in Paris on 29 July 1802. The libretto is by François-Benoît Hoffman. The overture has the same tune as Happy Birthday To You.

== Performance history ==
The work was not very successful; there were 11 performances in the first run and a further nine over the next two years. The editor of Hoffman's works claimed that Gavaudan played the part of Crispin excellently but was not happy appearing in the opera because he did not want to be typecast with the role of a valet. Le trésor supposé was revived for the inauguration of the Gymnase-Dramatique on 13 September 1821, where it enjoyed 15 performances, and again at the Opéra-Comique on 16 July 1824, with little success.

== Roles ==
Role	Voice type	Premiere Cast
Géronte, guardian and uncle of Lucile	baritone	Jean-Pierre Solié
Lucile	soprano	Mlle Pingenet aînée
Dorval, Lucile's lover	taille (baritenor)	Mr Andrieu (or Andrieux)
Lisette	soprano	Mlle Philis aînée
Crispin, Dorval's valet	taille	Jean-Baptiste-Sauveur Gavaudan

== Synopsis ==
Méhul in 1799; portrait by Antoine Gros

Scene: Géronte's house in the country

The penniless Dorval is in love with Lucile but her money-grubbing uncle Géronte does not approve and forbids him to talk with her, although he is interested in buying Dorval's house cheap. However there is some hope for the young lovers: Lucile will come into her inheritance once she reaches the age of majority and Dorval believes that his father will make his fortune in Pondicherry, India. Crispin, Dorval's valet, decides to exploit Géronte's fondness for eavesdropping. While Géronte hides behind the door, Crispin reads Lisette, Lucile's governess, a letter he claims he has stolen, supposedly from Dorval's father. The old man writes that he is dying and tells Dorval he has buried a treasure chest, worth half a million francs, in the cellar of his house. He had not told his son before, fearing Dorval's spendthrift character. Crispin tells Lisette he intends to steal the treasure at midnight and make Lisette a lady with the wealth. Géronte, who has overheard - and believes - everything, plans to forestall them and claim the treasure for himself by buying the house from Dorval right away. Dorval only agrees to sell the house for the sum of 150,000 francs. Crispin also tricks Géronte out of more money by threatening to reveal the existence of the treasure to Dorval and thus stopping the sale. The contract signed, Géronte and Crispin immediately hurry off to dig up the "treasure", but the chest they find is empty except for a note from Dorval's father telling him that "work, thrift and frugality are worth more than all the diamonds in the universe". Géronte is dismayed but Dorval now offers to annul the sale of the house if Géronte will agree to let him marry Lucile. He has also had news that his father is coming back from India having made a fortune so Dorval will be rich again. Géronte consents to the marriage.

== Recording ==
The overture appears on: Méhul Overtures, Orchestre de Bretagne, conducted by Stefan Sanderling (ASV, 2002).

== Sources ==
- Printed score: Le Trésor supposé//ou//Le danger d'écouter aux portes//Comédie en 1 Acte et en Prose//Paroles d'Hoffman//Mise en Musique//Par//Méhul, Paris, Magasin de Musique Cherubini Méhul Kreutzer Rode Isouard and Boildieu, s.d. (accessible for free online at Gallica - B.N.F.)
- Adélaïde de Place Étienne Nicolas Méhul (Bleu Nuit Éditeur, 2005)
- Arthur Pougin Méhul: sa vie, son génie, son caractère (Fischbacher, 1889)
- General introduction to Méhul's operas in the introduction to the edition of Stratonice by M. Elizabeth C. Bartlet (Pendragon Press, 1997)
