= Une folie =

- Opéra-comique by Étienne Méhul
- Dozainville as Francisque, sketch by Jean Duplessi-Bertaux, 1807
- Librettist: Jean-Nicolas Bouilly
- Language: French
- Premiere: 5 April 1802; Opéra-Comique, Paris

Une folie is an opera by the French composer Étienne Méhul. It takes the form of a comédie en vers mêlée de musique (an opéra-comique) in two acts. It premiered at the Opéra-Comique in Paris on 5 April 1802. The libretto is by Jean-Nicolas Bouilly. The work was a popular success and enjoyed several revivals, despite some hostile reviews. It was around this time, claimed Bouilly, that Méhul fought a duel with and wounded a journalist who had harshly criticised him.

== Roles ==
Role	Voice type	Premiere Cast
Cerberti, a famous painter, guardian of Armantine	baritone	Jean-Pierre Solié
Armantine, a young orphan	soprano	Mlle Philis ainée
Florival, an aide-de-camp, captain of hussars	taille (baritenor)	Jean Elleviou
Carlin, Florival's valet	baritone	Jean-Blaise Martin
Francisque, an old pigment grinder, in Cerberti's service	taille	Baptiste-Pierre Dardel, called Dozainville
Jacquinet-la-Treille, a young Picard villager, nephew and godson of Francisque	haute-contre	Mr. Le Sage
A hussar	spoken	Mr. Allair

== Synopsis ==
Méhul in 1799; portrait by Antoine Gros

Florival is in love with Armantine, the ward of the Italian painter Cerberti. At first he tries to deceive Cerberti by disguising himself as a Flemish art merchant but he is discovered. In the second act, Florival's valet pretends to be the nephew of an old servant of Cerberti's from Picardy. He persuades Cerberti to use Florival as a model for a painting of Bayard alongside Armantine. Florival's identity is betrayed but he is defiant, as is Armantine, who claims she is free to choose who she marries. Cerberti has no choice but to consent.

== Arrangements ==
Louis Spohr wrote his Variations on "Je suis encore dans mon printemps" for harp (Op. 36) based on the aria in Act 1, Scene 2.

== Sources ==
- Adélaïde de Place Étienne Nicolas Méhul (Bleu Nuit Éditeur, 2005)
- Arthur Pougin Méhul: sa vie, son génie, son caractère (Fischbacher, 1889)
- General introduction to Méhul's operas in the introduction to the edition of Stratonice by M. Elizabeth C. Bartlet (Pendragon Press, 1997)
- Original printed libretto at the Internet Archive
- Printed score at the Internet Archive
- John A. Rice, "Die beyden Füchse and Wagen gewinnt: Rival Viennese Productions of Méhul's Une Folie"
