= Bion (opera) =

Opera by Étienne Méhul

- Opéra comique by Étienne Méhul
- Title page of the score
- Librettist: François-Benoît Hoffman
- Language: French

Bion is an opera by the French composer Étienne Méhul. It takes the form of a comédie en vers mêlée de musique (an opéra comique) in one act. It premiered at the Opéra-Comique in Paris on 27 December 1800. The libretto, by François-Benoît Hoffman, is based on Les voyages d'Anténor by Étienne-François de Lantier. The opera was revived on 15 November 1802.

== Roles ==
Role	Voice type	Premiere Cast
Bion, a Greek poet	baritone	Jean-Pierre Solié
Nysa, a young Greek woman brought up by Bion	soprano	Mlle Philis aînée
Agénor, a young philosopher and lover of Nysa	tenor	Jean Elleviou
Cratès, a philosopher and friend of Agénor	tenor	Philippe Cauvy (known as "Philippe")

== Synopsis ==
Méhul in 1799; portrait by Antoine Gros

Scene: the island of Salamis

The middle-aged poet Bion is the guardian of young Nysa whom he has freed from slavery. He welcomes the travellers Cratès and Agénor, a young philosopher and pupil of Plato, as guests in his house. Agénor and Nysa fall in love, although Nysa does so reluctantly as she believes she owes a debt of gratitude to Bion. Bion pretends to go on a journey, saying he plans to marry Nysa on his return. During his absence, Nysa and Agénor declare their love for one another and decide to marry. Bion suddenly reappears leading a child disguised as Cupid and interrupts the wedding ceremony. He teases Agénor by pretending that the celebrations are for his marriage to Nysa. Agénor, overcome with shame at betraying Bion's hospitality, prepares to leave, but Bion tells the young couple he has known of their love all along and has engineered events to test them. He gives his blessing to their marriage.

== Recordings ==
The overture appears on: Méhul Overtures, Orchestre de Bretagne, conducted by Stefan Sanderling (ASV, 2002).

== Sources ==
- Arthur Pougin Méhul: sa vie, son génie, son caractère (Fischbacher, 1889)
- General introduction to Méhul's operas in the introduction to the edition of Stratonice by M. Elizabeth C. Bartlet (Pendragon Press, 1997)
- Nicole Wild and David Charlton, Théâtre de l'Opéra-Comique Paris: Répertoire 1762-1972 (Mardaga, 2005)
