= Mélidore et Phrosine =

- Opéra comique by Étienne Méhul
- Title page of the score
- Librettist: Antoine Vincent Arnault
- Language: French
- Premiere: 6 May 1794; Opéra-Comique (Théâtre Favart), Paris

Mélidore et Phrosine is an opera by the French composer Étienne Méhul. It takes the form of a drame lyrique (a type of opéra comique) in three acts. The libretto, by Antoine Vincent Arnault, is loosely based on the myth of Hero and Leander. The work was first performed at the Théâtre Favart in Paris on 6 May 1794. It is an important example of early Romantic opera.

== Background and performance history ==
Arnault derived his libretto from Gentil-Bernard's narrative poem Phrosine et Mélidore. In his memoirs, he describes the trouble he had with the French Revolutionary censorship of the time. He submitted the libretto to the censor Jean-Baptiste Baudrais, who found "nothing innocent in it." Baudrais explained: "It's not enough...that a work is not against us, it must be for us. The spirit of your opera is not republican; the behaviour of your characters is not republican; the word 'liberty!' is not pronounced a single time. You must bring your opera in harmony with our institutions." Fortunately for Arnault, he was able to enlist the help of the writer Legouvé who added a few more lines to the libretto with enough references to liberty to satisfy Baudrais.

The opera was a moderate success and divided the critics. Some saw it as a masterpiece, but others complained about its lack of simplicity. Arnault was unimpressed by the performance of the tenor Solié, who was subsequently replaced by Jean Elleviou. In the troubled atmosphere in the weeks before the fall of Robespierre, Arnault continued to worry that the opera would attract unwelcome attention from the authorities, but Méhul was on friendly terms with the leading politician Bertrand Barère. Shortly after, the composer wrote his most famous work of Revolutionary propaganda music, the Chant du départ.

== Roles ==
Méhul in 1799; portrait by Antoine Gros

Role	Voice type	Premiere Cast, 6 May 1794 (Conductor: Henri Montan Berton)
Mélidore	haute-contre	Louis Michu
Phrosine	soprano	Jeanne-Charlotte Schroeder, 'Madame Saint-Aubin'
Jule	taille (baritenor)	Jean-Pierre Solié
Aimar	bass-baritone (basse-taille)	Simon Chénard
Chorus: Mélidore's friends, Jule and Aimar's servants, peasants, sailors, passengers

== Synopsis ==
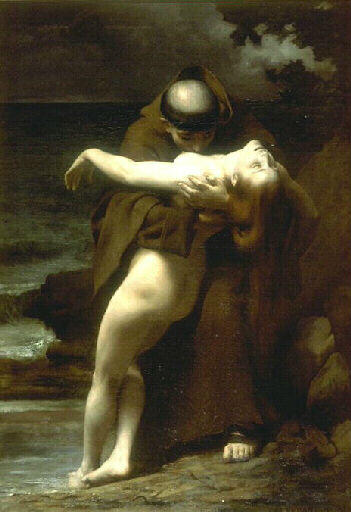
Phrosine et Mélidore by Édouard Joseph Dantan

=== Act 1 ===
Scene: A garden in Messina

Mélidore is in love with Phrosine but their marriage is forbidden by Phrosine's brothers Aimar and Jule, Aimar because he thinks Mélidore is not of a high enough social class, Jule because he nurtures incestuous feelings for his sister. The couple plan to elope so they can be married by a hermit on a nearby island but as they are making their escape, Aimar surprises them. In the ensuing fight, Mélidore apparently mortally wounds Aimar, who makes his followers swear revenge.

=== Act 2 ===
Scene: An island with a hermit's cave

Mélidore arrives on the hermit's island only to find him dead. He decides to assume the hermit's identity. Jule and Phrosine arrive to ask the hermit if he has seen the fugitive Mélidore. The "hermit" tells them that Mélidore has drowned. Phrosine is distraught but then she recognises Mélidore's voice. The two secretly make a plan to see each other again. Mélidore says he will light a beacon on the island every night which will guide Phrosine as she swims across the Straits of Messina to him.

=== Act 3 ===
Scene: Another part of the island

It is night. Mélidore lights the beacon just before a storm blows up. Mélidore prays for Phrosine's safety. However, the storm extinguishes the beacon. A boat arrives, but it contains Jule, not Phrosine. Jule explains how he had seen his sister swimming across the strait and pursued her in the boat. Phrosine swam towards him as she mistook Jule's torch for the beacon. Jule refused to let her get into the boat and left her to drown. Mélidore leaps into the sea to save her and drags her to land. The repentant Jule finally agrees to the couple's marriage, as does Aimar who turns out to have survived.

== Music ==
Mélidore et Phrosine was a boldly experimental work. Elizabeth Bartlet, writing in The New Grove Dictionary of Music and Musicians, comments: "Méhul’s experiments of the mid-1790s demonstrate how daring he was, particularly in a sometimes shocking use of dissonance, the deliberate incompletion of formal expectations for dramatic effect and the orchestral expression of extreme psychological states to a degree surpassing previous works. In Mélidore et Phrosine the composer achieved a musical unification through themes and motifs, tonal structures and modulation schemes not hitherto attempted in the genre." According to Winton Dean, "The harmonic style of Mélidore et Phrosine is bolder than anything in Rossini, Bellini or Donizetti, and even than early Beethoven." Hector Berlioz, an admirer of Méhul, praised the composer's innovative orchestration: "the music [of Mélidore et Phrosine] is often inspired and contains orchestral effects entirely new at the time, such as the use of four horns in their hollowest hand-stopped notes to accompany, like an instrumental death-rattle, the voice of a dying man."

Edward Dent described the opera's place in the development of musical Romanticism: "Mélidore et Phrosine has in fact almost all the ingredients we look for in a typical Romantic opera; but perhaps we do not recognise them, because they are definitely French and not German. If that sort of descriptive orchestral writing which is called the 'music of Nature' is typically Romantic, we shall find that in Méhul too, at any rate as far as storms are concerned. As a Frenchman, he is concerned primarily with human beings and human feelings. The conception of man as the helpless victim of the invisible forces of nature, of man as something less than nature, was impossible for him, at any rate at this stage of his career."

== Recordings ==
The overture appears on: Méhul Overtures, Orchestre de Bretagne, conducted by Stefan Sanderling (ASV, 2002) Catalogue number CD DCA 1140.

== Sources ==
- Adélaïde de Place Étienne Nicolas Méhul (Bleu Nuit Éditeur, 2005)
- The Viking Opera Guide, ed. Amanda Holden (Viking, 1993)
- Edward Joseph Dent The Rise of Romantic Opera (Cambridge University Press, 1979 edition)
- Winton Dean, chapter on French opera in Gerald Abraham (ed.) The New Oxford History of Music Volume 8: The Age of Beethoven 1790-1830 (Oxford University Press, 1988)
- Elizabeth Bartlet, entry on Méhul in the New Grove Dictionary of Music and Musicians
- Hector Berlioz, Evenings with the Orchestra, translated by Jacques Barzun (University of Chicago Press, 1973; 1999 reprint)
- Libretto in French: Mélidore et Phrosine; drame lyrique en 3 actes. Paroles du citoyen Arnault. Musique du citoyen Méhul, Paris, Maradan, 1794 (l'an second de la republique)
- Original printed score: Mélidore et Phrosine, Drame lyrique en trois actes, Paroles du Citoyen Arnault, Représenté pour la première fois sur le Théâtre Lyrique de la rue Favart, le 17 Germinal, l'An second de la République Française, Mis en Musique Par le Citoyen Mehul, Paris, Huguet, 1794 (accessible for free online at Gallica – B.N.F.)
