= Doria (opera) =

French opera

Doria, ou La tyrannie détruite
- Opéra comique by Étienne Méhul
- Language: French
- Premiere: 12 March 1795; Opéra-Comique, Paris, France

Méhul in 1799 – portrait by Antoine Gros

Doria, ou La tyrannie détruite (Doria, or Tyranny Destroyed) is an opera in three acts by the French composer Étienne Méhul. It is in the form of an opéra comique (that is, with spoken dialogue between the musical numbers), although the authors style it an opéra héroïque. It premiered at the Opéra-Comique, Paris on 12 March 1795. The libretto is by Gabriel-Marie Legouvé and Charles-Joseph Lœuillard Davrigny. The work was not a success, in spite of revisions after the premiere.

== Roles ==
Role	Voice type	Premiere Cast
André Doria		
Gonzague		
Vivalde		
Sporta		
Olimipia		
Albanie		
Jannetin		
Léonelle		

== Synopsis ==
Andrea Doria laments the oppression of his native Genoa under its foreign governor. He plans a conspiracy with his friends and suborns Vivaldi, the commander of the governor's guard. Doria arranges his own wedding to disguise the plot - the conspirators will strike during the festivities. Doria meets the governor in a wood and tells him of the conspiracy. Believing its success to be inevitable, he advises the governor to flee and save his life. However, Vivaldi has changed sides again and betrays Doria, who is held captive in the city's fortress. Doria's loyal supporter Sporta rouses the common people and they besiege the stronghold. The governor appears with Doria on the battlements and threatens to stab him to death, but the governor himself is struck down by Sporta, who has managed to break into the fortress with a group of friends. Doria's younger brother kills Vivaldi.

== Sources ==
- Adélaïde de Place Étienne Nicolas Méhul (Bleu Nuit Éditeur, 2005)
- Arthur Pougin Méhul: sa vie, son génie, son caractère (Fischbacher, 1889)
- General introduction to Méhul's operas in the introduction to the edition of Stratonice by M. Elizabeth C. Bartlet (Pendragon Press, 1997)
