= Valentine de Milan =

Opera by Étienne Méhul

Méhul in 1799 – portrait by Antoine Gros

Valentine de Milan (Valentina of Milan) is an opera by the French composer Étienne Méhul with a libretto by Jean-Nicolas Bouilly. It takes the form of a drame lyrique in three acts. Méhul began work on the score in 1807, revising it in 1815, but it was left incomplete when he died in 1817. His nephew Joseph Daussoigne-Méhul finished the opera, adding five numbers, and it premiered at the Opéra-Comique, Paris on 28 November 1822, five years after Méhul's death. At the end of the performance, a bust of Méhul was brought on stage and crowned with flowers and laurel wreaths to the acclamation of the audience. The opera was a success and there were frequent performances until 1825, when it disappeared from the Opéra-Comique's repertory. Louis Spohr staged a German version in Kassel in 1824.

== Roles ==
Role	Voice type	Premiere Cast
Jean Galéas, Viscomti, Grand Duke of Milan	basse-taille (bass-baritone)	Mr Darancourt
Valentine, the Grand Duke's only daughter	soprano	Mme Paul (also called Paul-Michu)
Louis de France, brother of Charles VI, King of France	haute-contre	Auguste Huet
Olivier de Clisson, Constable of France, head of the allies against the Milanese	basse-taille	Eugène Dessessarts
Sire-Albert, a famous doctor, friend and confidant of Prince Louis	basse taille	Mr Leclerc
Urbain Galéas, nephew of the Grand Duke	taille (baritenor)/haute-contre	Alexis Dupont
The Duke of Florence, ally of the Grand Duke	basse taille	Jean-Pierre Louvet
The Duke of Ferrara, ally of the Grand Duke	basse-taille	François Louis Ferdinand Deshayes, called 'Henri'
Laurencia, a pharmacist, aged fifty, retired to a village	soprano	Marie Desbrosses
An unknown man	mute role	Mr Gregoire
First squire of Prince Louis	spoken	Mr Allair
First squire of the duke	spoken	Mr Mada
Chorus: French and Swiss soldiers; lords and ladies; Milanese and Flemish soldiers; male and female villagers

== Synopsis ==
The setting is Milan and its environs in the late 14th century. The subject is the love of Valentina Visconti, daughter of Duke Gian Galeazzo of Milan, and Louis of Orléans, younger brother of King Charles VI of France. Valentina wants to marry Louis, but her father is at war with the French and so he has nothing but hatred for him. However, the French beat the Milanese and Valentina persuades Gian Galeazzo to accept the peace Louis offers, in spite of the fierce opposition of the Dukes of Florence and Ferrara, both in love with Valentina themselves. In the second act, the two sides are about to sign the peace treaty when Louis is shot by an unknown hand. Clisson, Constable of France, blames Gian Galeazzo for the assassination attempt and war almost breaks out again. Valentina disguises herself as a shepherdess and fetches the old pharmacist Laurencia, who saves Louis' life. Gian Galeazzo appears in Louis' tent and offers to hand over his sword in response to his accusers. However, the real assassin is arrested and found to be an agent of the Duke of Burgundy. Valentina's identity is revealed and she declares her love for Louis. The couple are married.

== Sources ==
- Printed score: Valentine de Milan//Opéra en 3 Actes,//Paroles de J. N. Bouilly//Musique de//Méhul..., Paris, Schlesinger, s.d. (accessible for free online at Gallica - B.N.F.)
- Adélaïde de Place Étienne Nicolas Méhul (Bleu Nuit Éditeur, 2005)
- Arthur Pougin Méhul: sa vie, son génie, son caractère (Fischbacher, 1889)
- General introduction to Méhul's operas in the introduction to the edition of Stratonice by M. Elizabeth C. Bartlet (Pendragon Press, 1997)
