= Cora (opera) =

Opera by Étienne Méhul

Méhul in 1799 – portrait by Antoine Gros

Cora is an opera in four acts by the French composer Étienne Méhul. The libretto, by Valadier, is based on the novel Les Incas by Jean-François Marmontel. It was the first opera Méhul wrote but the second to be performed, receiving its premiere at the Académie Royale de Musique (the Paris Opéra) on 15 February 1791. Cora was not a success and there were only four more performances (18, 20, 25 February and 4 March).

== Background ==
In 1784 the Académie Royale de Musique held a competition for new libretti. From the 58 candidates the judges chose three winners: Chabanon's Le toison d'or, Guillard's Œdipe à Colone and Valadier's Alonzo et Cora. Chabanon's libretto was never set; Guillard's provided Antonio Sacchini with the text for his most famous opera (premiered in 1786); and Valadier's was handed to Méhul. Since arriving in Paris in the late 1770s Méhul had published two sets of keyboard sonatas and written or arranged vocal works for the Concert Spirituel, but this was his first opportunity to compose an opera. He set to work writing the score in 1785-86 and in 1787 his supporters, the composer Jean-Baptiste Lemoyne and the man of letters Jean-Baptiste-Antoine Suard, urged the Académie to stage the work. It went into rehearsal on 10 June 1789 but was abandoned on 8 August. The reasons for this delay are unknown, but the Académie was suffering from severe financial difficulties at the time.

Frustrated at his lack of progress at the Académie Royale, Méhul turned to its rival the Opéra Comique, which staged his debut Euphrosine on 4 September 1790. The great success of this work prompted the Académie Royale to dust off Alonzo et Cora (now retitled simply Cora) for a performance on 15 February 1791. However, the piece was a failure; the musicologist Arthur Pougin blames this on the inadequacies of the libretto rather than Méhul's music.

== Style ==
According to the Méhul scholar Elizabeth Bartlet, the music of Cora demonstrates "not only [Méhul's] indebtedness to the 'reform' operas of Gluck and Salieri but also his awareness of symphonic style (particularly Haydn's) and his interest in dynamic, large-scale ensembles - both of which were unusual for the period."

== Roles ==
| Role | Voice type | Premiere Cast |
|---|---|---|
| Ataliba, King of Quito | tenor/baritone | François Lays |
| Alonso, a Spanish general | haute-contre | Jean-Joseph Rousseau |
| The High Priest | basse-taille (bass-baritone) | Auguste-Athanase (Augustin) Chéron |
| Cora | soprano | Adélaïde Gavaudan, "cadette" |
| Zémor, Cora's father | tenor/baritone | Louis-Claude-Armand Chardin (stage name, "Chardini") |
| Zélia, Cora's mother | soprano | Marie-Thérèse Davoux (stage name, "Mlle Maillard") |
| Zulma, Cora's friend | soprano | Mlle Mullot |
| A warrior | basse-taille | Martin |

== Sources ==
- Adélaïde de Place Étienne Nicolas Méhul (Bleu Nuit Éditeur, 2005)
- Arthur Pougin Méhul: sa vie, son génie, son caractère (Fischbacher, 1889)
- General introduction to Méhul's operas in the introduction to the edition of Stratonice by M. Elizabeth C. Bartlet (Pendragon Press, 1997)
