= Le baiser et la quittance =

Opera by multiple composers

Méhul in 1799 – portrait by Antoine Gros

Le baiser et la quittance, ou Une aventure de garnison (The Kiss and the Receipt, or A Garrison Adventure) is an opera by the composers Étienne Méhul, François-Adrien Boieldieu, Rodolphe Kreutzer and Nicolas Isouard. It takes the form of an opéra bouffon in three acts. It premiered at the Opéra-Comique, Paris on 18 June 1803. The libretto is by Picard, Longchamps and Dieulafoy. The work was a failure and only ran for four performances.

== Sources ==
- Adélaïde de Place Étienne Nicolas Méhul (Bleu Nuit Éditeur, 2005)
- Arthur Pougin Méhul: sa vie, son génie, son caractère (Fischbacher, 1889)
- General introduction to Méhul's operas in the introduction to the edition of Stratonice by M. Elizabeth C. Bartlet (Pendragon Press, 1997)
