= Auguste Creuzé de Lesser =

French poet, playwright, librettist and politician (1771–1839)

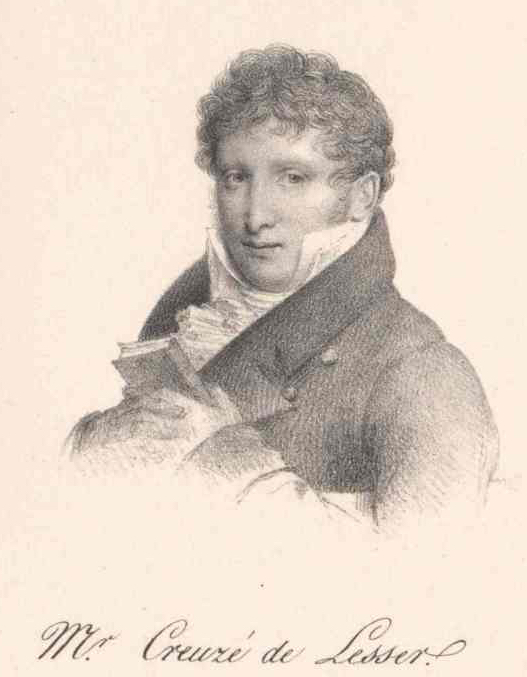
- Born: 3 October 1771; Paris, France
- Died: 14 August 1839 (aged 67)
- Occupations: Playwright; poet; liberttist; politician

Baron Auguste (Note: Sometimes called Augustin, Augustin-François or Auguste-François. His first works were published under the sole name Auguste.) Creuzé de Lesser (3 October 1771 – 14 August 1839) was a French poet, playwright, librettist and politician.

== Works ==
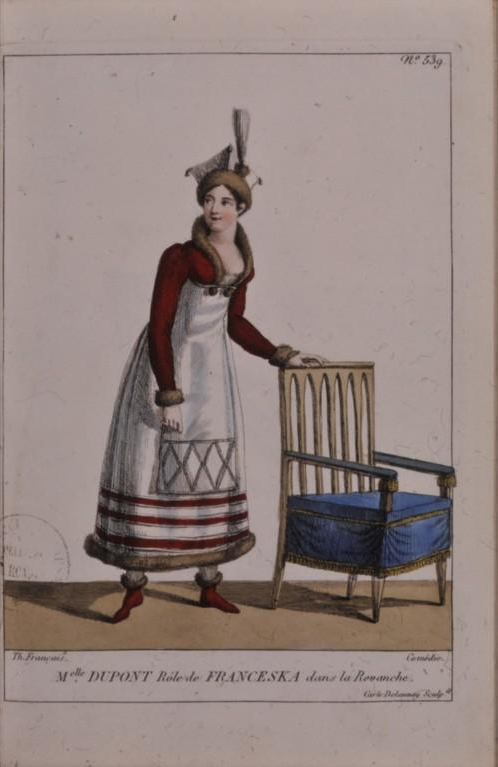
La revanche - comedy by François Roger and Creuzé de Lesser

- 1790: Satires de Juvenal, traduction en prose
- 1796: Le Seau enlevé, poème héroï-comique, imitated from Tassoni, suivi d'un choix des stances les plus intéressantes de l'auteur italien et de quelques poésies
- 1806: Voyage en Italie et en Sicile, fait en 1801 et 1802 Text online at Gallica
- 1811: La Table ronde, poem
- 1812: Roland, poem
- 1813: Amadis de Gaule, poème, faisant suite à la Table ronde
- 1814: El Cid, romances espagnoles imitées en romances françaises
- 1825: Apologues
- 1831: Le Dernier Homme, poème imité de Grainville
- 1832: De la Liberté, ou Résumé de l'histoire des républiques
- 1834: Étrennes pour les enfants. Contes de fées mis en vers, imités de Perrault et autres
- 1834: Annales secrètes d'une famille pendant 1800 ans mises au jour (2 volumes)
- 1835: Les Véritables Lettres d'Héloïse, in verse
- 1837: Le Roman des romans (2 volumes)
- 1839: La Chevalerie, ou les Histoires du Moyen Âge, composées de La Table ronde, Amadis, Roland, poèmes sur les trois grandes familles de la chevalerie romanesque
- 1839: Le Naufrage et le Désert

Theatre and opera

- 1794: Les Voleurs, tragedy in five acts in prose after Friedrich von Schiller
- 1798: Les Français à Cythère, comedy in 1 act in prose, mingled with vaudevilles, with René-André-Polydore Alissan de Chazet and Emmanuel Dupaty, Théâtre du Vaudeville, 17 March
- 1799: Ninon de Lenclos, ou l'Épicuréisme, comédie en vaudeville in 1 act and in prose, Théâtre des Troubadours, 2 September
- 1799: La Clef forée, ou la Première Représentation, anecdote en vaudevilles in 1 act, with François-Pierre-Auguste Léger, Théâtre des Troubadours, 17 October
- 1806: Monsieur Deschalumeaux ou la Soirée de carnaval, opéra bouffon in three acts, music by Pierre Gaveaux, Opéra-Comique, 17 February
- 1806: Le Déjeuner de garçons, comedy mingled with music, Théâtre Feydeau, 24 April
- 1807: L'Amante sans le savoir, one-act opéra comique, music by Jean-Pierre Solié, Théâtre Feydeau
- 1809: Le Secret du ménage, comedy in 3 acts and in verse, Théâtre-Français, 25 May Text online
- 1809: La Revanche, three-act comedy, with François Roger, Comédie-Française, 15 July
- 1809: Le Diable à quatre, ou la Femme acariâtre, three-act opéra comique, after Michel-Jean Sedaine, music by Jean-Pierre Solié, Théâtre Feydeau, 30 November
- 1810: Le Présent de noces, ou le Pari, one-act opéra comique, music by Henri François Berton, Théâtre Feydeau, 2 January
- 1801: Les Deux Espiègles, one-act comédie en vaudeville, with François Roger, Théâtre du Vaudeville, 8 January
- 1811: Le Magicien sans magie, two-act opéra comique, with François Roger, Opéra-Comique, 4 November
- 1811: Ninette à la cour, opéra comique in 2 acts and in verse, after Charles-Simon Favart, music by Henri Montan Berton, Opéra-Comique, 24 December
- 1811: Le Billet de loterie, one-act comedy, mingled with ariettes, with François Roger, music by Nicolas Isouard, Opéra-Comique, 14 September
- 1813: Le Nouveau Seigneur de village, one-act opéra comique, with Edmond de Favières, music by François-Adrien Boieldieu, Opéra-Comique, 29 June
- 1813: Mlle de Launay à la Bastille, one-act historical comedy, mingled with ariettes, with François Roger, Opéra-Comique, 16 December
- 1932: Le Prince et la Grisette, comedy in 3 acts and in verse, Paris, Théâtre-Français, 11 January

== Sources ==
- Anonyme, Répertoire général du Théâtre-Français, composé des tragédies, comédies et drames des auteurs du premier et du second ordre, restés au Théâtre-Français, H. Nicolle, Paris, vol. XXIV, 1817, (p. 113).
- Ferdinand Hoefer, Nouvelle Biographie générale, Firmin-Didot, Paris, vol. XII, 1855, col. 453-454.
- Pierre Larousse, Grand Dictionnaire universel du XIXe, vol. V, 1869, (p. 510).
- Frédéric Godefroy, Histoire de la littérature française depuis le XVIe jusqu'à nos jours, vol. VII, XIXe, poètes, t. I, 1878, (p. 16-19).
- "Auguste Creuzé de Lesser", in Adolphe Robert and Gaston Cougny, Dictionnaire des parlementaires français (1789–1891), Bourloton, Paris, 1889 Edition details Wikisource
