= Le jeune sage et le vieux fou =

- Opéra comique by Étienne Méhul
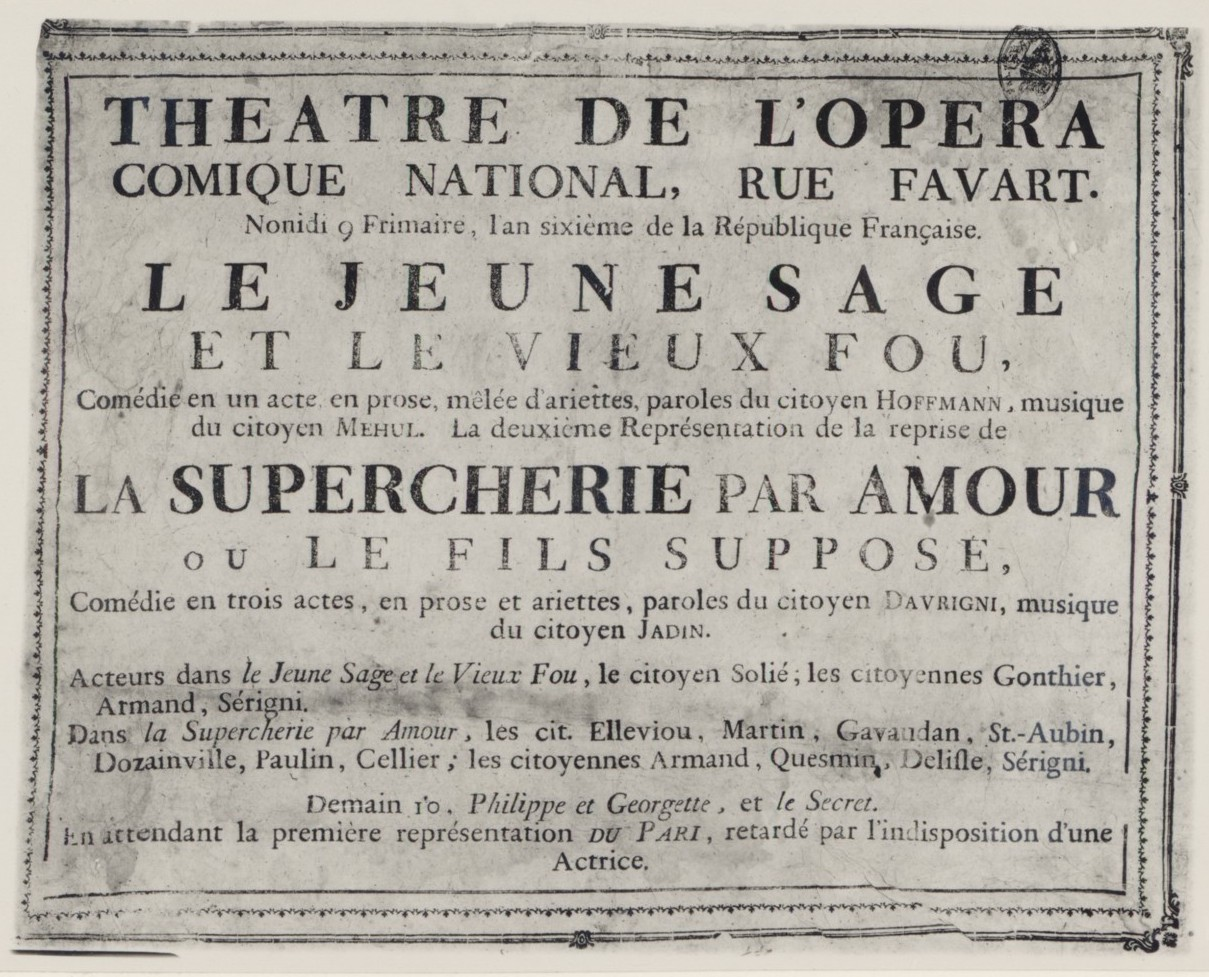
- Poster for a performance on Nonedi, 9 Frimaire, year VI of the French First Republic (29 November 1797)
- Librettist: François-Benoît Hoffman
- Language: French
- Premiere: 28 March 1793; Opéra-Comique (Théâtre Favart), Paris

Le jeune sage et le vieux fou (The Wise Young Man and the Old Fool) is an opera by the French composer Étienne Méhul with a libretto by François-Benoît Hoffman. It takes the form of a comédie mêlée de musique (a type of opéra comique) in one act. It was first performed at the Théâtre Favart in Paris on 28 March 1793. A revised version appeared in 1801.

The opera was well received. A review in the Chronique de Paris of 1 April described the music as "by turns original, witty and romantic." According to David Cairns, this marks the first reference to Romanticism in music. The overture musically depicts the two main characters: unaccompanied flutes represent the wise young man and cellos, trombones and basses the old fool. Variations on these themes recur throughout the score.

== Roles ==
Role	Voice type	Premiere cast
Merval	taille (baritenor)	
Cliton, Merval's son	soprano	
Élise, a widow	soprano	
Rose, Élise's niece	soprano	
Frontin, a valet	spoken	

== Synopsis ==
Méhul in 1799; portrait by Antoine Gros

Cliton is a 16-year-old obsessed with appearing wise. His father, Merval, is over 60 and a libertine, much to the embarrassment of his son. Cliton thinks marriage will make Merval more responsible and urges him to take the young and sensible Rose as his wife while Cliton himself plans to marry Rose's aunt, the prudish Élise. However, it emerges Rose is secretly in love with Cliton and Merval persuades his son to marry her instead while Merval will marry the aunt. After more comic confusion, Élise finally accepts this state of affairs.

== Recordings ==
The overture appears on: Méhul Overtures, Orchestre de Bretagne, conducted by Stefan Sanderling (ASV, 2002) Catalogue number CD DCA 1140.
