= Ariodant =

1799 opera by Étienne-Nicolas Méhul

- Opéra comique by Étienne Méhul
- Title page of the libretto
- Librettist: François-Benoît Hoffman
- Language: French
- Based on: Episode in Ariosto's Orlando Furioso
- Premiere: 11 October 1799; Opéra-Comique, Paris

Ariodant is an opéra comique (drame mêlé de musique) in three acts by the French composer Étienne Méhul first performed at the Théâtre Favart in Paris on 11 October 1799. The libretto, by François-Benoît Hoffman is based on the same episode in Ariosto's Orlando Furioso that also inspired Handel's opera Ariodante. The work had a profound influence on the development of Romantic opera, particularly in Germany.

== Performance history ==
The premiere took place on 11 October 1799. There were fears that the success of the opera might be damaged by the plot's similarity to Henri-Montan Berton's Montano et Stéphanie, which had debuted on 15 April of the same year. In the event, the audience was warmly appreciative and Méhul appeared on stage at the end to take their applause (Hoffman had been kept at home by illness). Méhul dedicated the score to his friend Luigi Cherubini.

== Roles ==
Roles, voice types, premiere cast
Role	Voice type	Premiere cast, 11 October 1799
Ariodant	haute-contre	Jean-Baptiste-Sauveur Gavaudan
Dalinde	soprano	Mlle Philis aînée
Edgard	taille (baritenor)	Jean-Pierre Solié
Ina	soprano	Anne-Aimée Armand
Lurcain	basse taille (bass-baritone)	Simon Chénard
Othon	haute-contre/taille	Philippe Cauvy, called "Philippe"
A bard	haute-contre	Jean-Mathias Batiste
A guide	spoken	Citoyen Fleuriot
Another guide	spoken	Citoyen Saint-Aubin
Four friends of Ariodant	members of the choir	
Chorus: Men and women of Edgard's court; judges; soldiers

== Synopsis ==
Méhul in 1799; portrait by Antoine Gros

=== Act 1 ===
Scene: The court of King Edgard

Ina, daughter of King Edgard of Scotland, is in love with the knight Ariodant. Ina's rejected suitor, the villainous Othon, plots against her with Ina's maid Dalinde. Othon and Ariodant are about to fight when the feast is announced in the king's hall.

=== Act 2 ===
Scene: A garden at night, overlooked by Ina's balcony

A bard plays a song on his harp. Ariodant has arranged a midnight duel with Othon and Ina gives him a ribbon of her own hair. Lurcain, Ina's brother, and four other knights enter and hide. They are there to make sure Othon does not play any dirty tricks. However, when Othon arrives he does not fight but tells Ariodant he has been visiting Ina's bedroom every night. When Dalinde appears at the balcony dressed as Ina, it apparently proves Othon's point. Lurcain and Edgard arrest Ina for unchastity.

=== Act 3 ===
Scene: The hall of justice

Ina is about to be put on trial. Othon tries to make a deal with her: if she will agree to marry him, he will claim she has secretly been his wife all along. Ina refuses. Othon's henchmen tell him they have made away with Dalinde. The trial goes ahead, but the accused turns out to be Dalinde, veiled and in disguise. She reveals the details of Othon's plot and how Othon's men would have murdered her had she not been saved by Ariodant.

== The work ==
Ariodant, with its sombre and dramatic character, is among the most highly regarded of Méhul's works. Edward Dent wrote, "This is perhaps the best of all Méhul's operas, for it has consistency of style, and a plot which although wildly Romantic is not outrageously nonsensical and deals with very genuine human emotions. Moreover, it is not dependent, as some of these operas are, on scenic effects such as storms and avalanches." Méhul scholar Elizabeth Bartlet describes it as "Mehul's best work of the decade and a highpoint of Revolutionary opera. It epitomises the major achievements of the genre: musical continuity and unification in spite of divisions caused by the spoken dialogue, the coordination of music and drama in the work as a whole, and inventiveness of form, orchestral treatment, and vocal writing to realise theatrical and musical aims."

Ariodant had a profound influence on German Romantic opera, especially Weber's Euryanthe (1823), which has a very similar chivalric plot. But Weber also learned from Méhul's use of the orchestra to evoke atmosphere. As John Warrack writes: "Much of the opera is set by night or in underground rooms and labyrinthine passages or a thick forest and Méhul responds with some of the swarthiest orchestration he can contrive, setting the tone at once with an overture (brief, irregular in form, and ending in harmonic mid-air) beginning on three solo cellos and ending on unison double basses." The opera also makes use of a "reminiscence motif" (the forerunner of the Leitmotiv), descending discords symbolising Othon's jealousy and anger which recur throughout the work. According to Winton Dean, it occurs in "at least eight of the fifteen movements of the opera."

== Recordings ==
The overture appears on: Méhul Overtures, Orchestre de Bretagne, conducted by Stefan Sanderling (ASV, 2002) Catalogue number CD DCA 1140.

The soprano Véronique Gens sings Ina's act 2 recitative, melodrama and aria "Quelle fureur barbare!...Mais, que dis-je?...Ô des amants le plus fidèle" on the album Tragédiennes Volume 3 with Les Talens Lyriques conducted by Christophe Rousset (Virgin Classics, 2011).
