= La taupe et les papillons =

La taupe et les papillons (The Mole and the Butterflies) is an opera by the French composer Étienne Méhul. It takes the form of a comédie lyrique in one act. The libretto is by Ange-Étienne-Xavier Poisson de La Chabeaussière. Composed in 1797–1798, it was due to be staged at the Théâtre Montansier in 1799 but political censorship meant the opera was never performed.
