= Caroline Samuel =

Belgian composer and pianist

Caroline Samuel (1 November 1822 – 15 March 1851) was a Belgian composer, pianist, and the first teacher of her brother, composer Adolphe Samuel.

Samuel was born into a musical family in Liege, Belgium. Although only two years older than her brother Adolphe, she was his first music teacher. Samuel herself studied with Joseph Daussoigne-Mehul at the Royal Conservatory of Liege, where she won several prizes: second prize for piano in 1833; first prize for piano in 1835; and first prize for harmony in 1836.

Before dying prematurely at age 29, Samuel earned money to support her mother and sisters by performing on piano. Her compositions were published by Lahou (Brussels).

== Works ==
- Two Fantasies (piano)
- Melodies (voice and piano)
