= Joseph Daussoigne-Méhul =

French composer and music educator

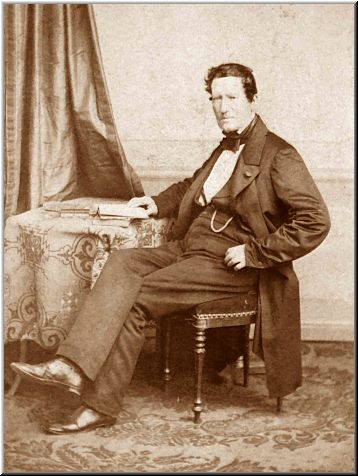
Joseph Daussoigne-Méhul

Joseph Daussoigne-Méhul (10 June 1790 – 10 March 1875) was a French composer and music educator. He served as the first director of the Royal Conservatory of Liège from 1826–1862; having been appointed to that post by William I of the Netherlands. In addition to his duties as director, he also taught courses in harmony and composition at the school. Among his notable pupils were Adolphe and Caroline Samuel, César Franck, and Jean-Théodore Radoux, the latter of whom succeeded him as conservatory director. In 1859, he was made a Commander of the Order of Leopold.

== Life and career ==
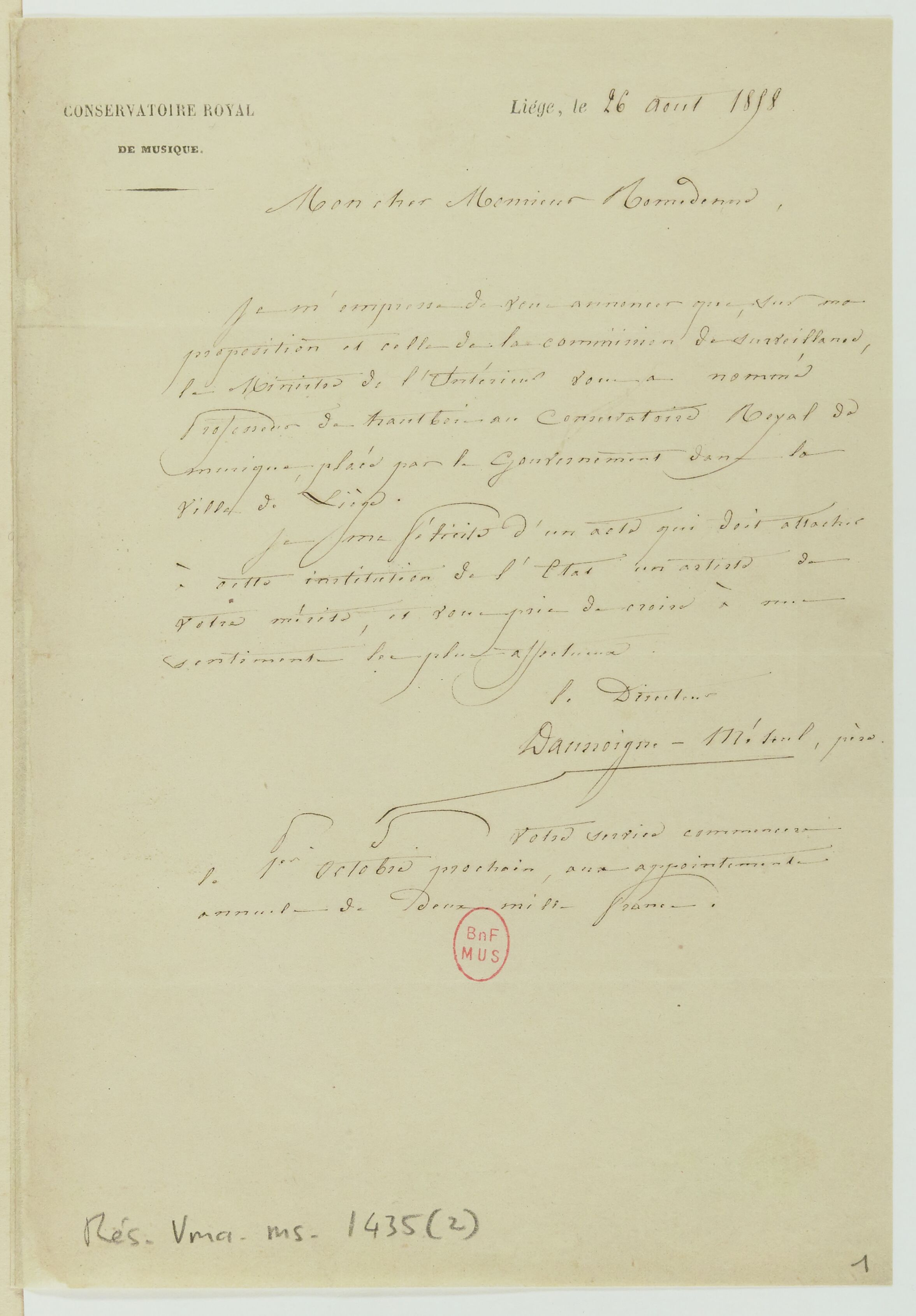
Letter by Joseph Daussoigne-Méhul to Alphonse Romedenne (1858)

Born Louis-Joseph Daussoigne in Givet, Ardennes, he legally changed his name to Joseph Daussoigne-Méhul on 12 August 1845 when he was 55 years old. He and his younger brother had been adopted by their uncle, the composer Étienne Méhul, in 1797 when he was seven years old. His brother served as a lieutenant in the French Army during the War of 1812 and was killed in action.

In 1799, Daussoigne-Méhul entered the Conservatoire de Paris when he was just nine years old. He studied there for the next 10 years, during which time he received several academic honours and competition prizes from the Conservatoire, including first prizes in music theory (1799), composition (1803), piano (1806), counterpoint (1808), and fugue (1808). His teachers included Louis Adam (piano), Charles Simon Catel (harmony), and his uncle (composition). In 1803, he began teaching music theory at the Conservatoire.

In 1809, Daussoigne-Méhul won the Prix de Rome with the cantata Agar dans le désert. As a result, he received a scholarship to continue his studies at the French Academy in Rome located in the Villa Medici, within the Villa Borghese. He accordingly resigned his teaching post at the Conservatoire and went to Rome where he studied from February 1810 through late 1813. He returned to teaching at the Conservatoire in Paris in 1814, leaving there in 1826 when he became the first director of the Royal Conservatory of Liège. He remained in that post for the next 35 years.

Daussoigne-Méhul died in Liège at the age of 84. He was married for more than 50 years to Marie-Adélaïde Bellet who was the daughter of Parisian building contractor Alexandre-Godefroy Bellet. Their son was the pianist, organist, composer, and music critic Alexandre-Gustave Daussoigne-Méhul (1830–1932).

== Composer ==
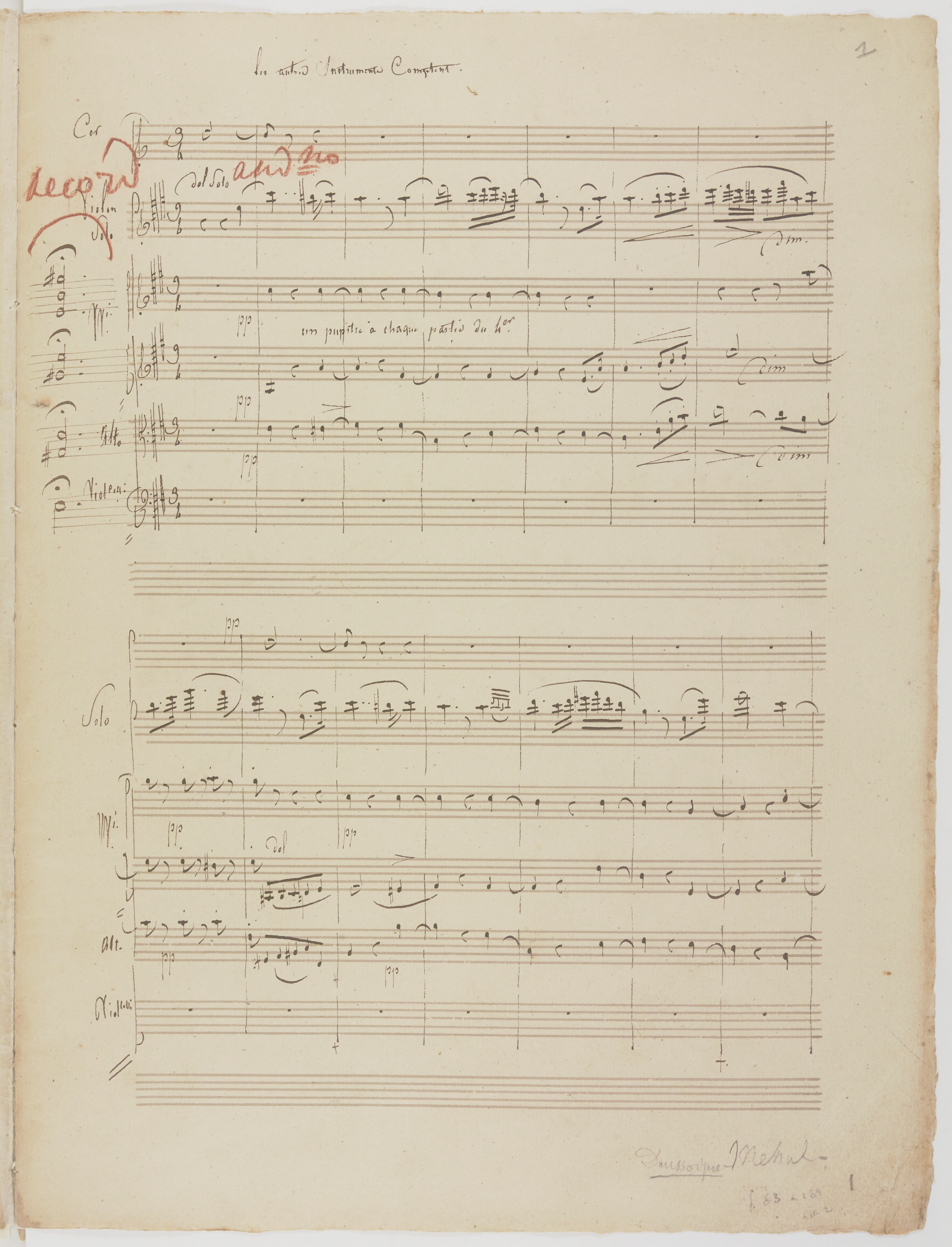
Ballets pour Pharamond (1825)

As a composer, Daussoigne-Méhul produced several works for solo piano, some symphonic music, a few operas, and some chamber music. His comic opera Aspasie et Pericles was premiered at the Paris Opera in 1820. He also completed his uncle's unfinished opera Valentine de Milan, which premiered at the Opéra-Comique in 1822. He also composed new recitatives for his uncle's opera Stratonice in 1821. Although he had admirers among his contemporaries, his music had no lasting impact and fell into obscurity by the late 19th century. None of his music has survived in the concert repertoire.
