= Jean-Frédéric Edelmann =

French composer (1749–1794)

Jean-Frédéric Edelmann (born Johann Friedrich Edelmann; 5 May 1749 – 17 July 1794) was a French classical composer.

== Life ==
He was born in Strasbourg to a Protestant family of Alsatian descent. After studying law and music, he moved to Paris in 1774 where he played and taught the piano. It is possible that Edelmann worked for some time in London. During the French Revolution he was appointed administrator of the Bas-Rhin. In late May 1794 he was arrested after a false accusation of treason (he was in fact an opposer of the terroristic policy and paid the hatred of Saint-Just). Sentenced to death by the Revolutionary Tribunal on 17 July 1794 (29th Messidor), he was executed the same day by guillotine in Place de la Barrière du Trône together with his brother Louis, other two Strasbourg citizens, and the sixteen Carmelite nuns of Compiègne (only eleven days before the fall of Robespierre). His work was praised by Haydn and Mozart.

Edelmann composed two operas, an oratorio and various pieces of chamber music.

He died in Paris.

== Works ==
=== Published works ===
- Op. 1 No. 1. Keyboard Sonata in E♭ major
- Op. 1 No. 2. Keyboard Sonata in E major
- Op. 1 No. 3. Keyboard Sonata in D major
- Op. 1 No. 4. Keyboard Sonata in A major
- Op. 1 No. 5. Keyboard Sonata in D major
- Op. 1 No. 6. Keyboard Sonata in F♯ major
- Op. 2 No. 1. Keyboard Sonata in C major
- Op. 2 No. 2. Keyboard Sonata in F major
- Op. 2 No. 3. Keyboard Sonata in C major
- Op. 2 No. 4. Keyboard Sonata in G major
- Op. 2 No. 5. Keyboard Sonata in E major
- Op. 2 No. 6. Keyboard Sonata in B♭ major
- Op. 3 No. 1. Keyboard Sonata in E♭ minor
- Op. 3 No. 2. Keyboard Sonata in F major
- Op. 4. Keyboard Concerto in D major
- Op. 5 No. 1. Keyboard Sonata in A major
- Op. 5 No. 2. Keyboard Sonata in G minor
- Op. 5 No. 3. Keyboard Sonata in C minor
- Op. 5 No. 4. Keyboard Sonata in D minor
- Op. 6 No. 1. Keyboard Sonata in G minor
- Op. 6 No. 2. Keyboard Sonata in D minor
- Op. 6 No. 3. Keyboard Sonata in C major
- Op. 7 No. 1. Keyboard Sonata in E♭ major
- Op. 7 No. 2. Keyboard Sonata in G minor
- Op. 8 No. 1. Keyboard Sonata in C minor
- Op. 8 No. 2. Keyboard Sonata in E minor (Mlle Edelmann)
- Op. 8 No. 3. Keyboard Sonata in D major
- Op. 9 No. 1. Keyboard Quartet in E♭ major
- Op. 9 No. 2. Keyboard Quartet in C minor
- Op. 9 No. 3. Keyboard Quartet in G minor
- Op. 9 No. 4. Keyboard Quartet in D major
- Op. 10 No. 1. Keyboard Sonata in F minor
- Op. 10 No. 2. Keyboard Sonata in E♭ major
- Op. 10 No. 3. Keyboard Sonata in C minor
- Op. 10 No. 4. Keyboard Sonata in E major
- Op. 11. Opera La bergère des Alpes (Paris, Tuileries 20 July 1781)
- Op. 12. Keyboard Concerto in A minor
- Op. 13 No. 1. Keyboard Quartet in C major
- Op. 13 No. 2. Keyboard Quartet in B♭ major
- Op. 13 No. 3. Keyboard Quartet in C minor
- Op. 13 No. 4. Keyboard Quartet in D major
- Op. 14 No. 1. Keyboard Concerto in F minor
- Op. 14 No. 2. Keyboard Concerto in F major
- Op. 14 No. 3. Keyboard Concerto in E major
- Op. 15 No. 1. Keyboard Quartet in A major "Le rendez-vous"
- Op. 15 No. 2. Keyboard Quartet in E major "La toilette de Vénus"
- Op. 15 No. 3. Keyboard Quartet in G minor "Les regrets d'Herminie"
- Op. 15 No. 4. Keyboard Quartet in E♭ major "La partie de chasse"
- Op. 16. Airs for keyboard

=== Unpublished works ===
- Oratorio Esther (Paris, Concert Spirituel, 8 April 1781) lost
- Opera Ariane dans l’isle de Naxos (Paris, Opéra, 24 Sept 1782)
- Ballet Feu (Paris, Opéra, 24 Sept 1782)
- Opera Diane et l’amour
