= Adrien (opera) =

Opera by Étienne-Nicolas Méhul

Arien
- Opéra comique by Étienne Méhul
- Title page of the libretto
- Librettist: François-Benoît Hoffman
- Language: French
- Based on: Metastasio's Adriano in Siria
- Premiere: 4 June 1799; Paris Opéra

Adrien (Hadrian) is an opera by the French composer Étienne Méhul. The libretto, by François-Benoît Hoffman, is closely based on Metastasio's Adriano in Siria. Written in 1791 and intended for performance at the Paris Opéra in 1792, the work was caught up in the turbulent political climate of the French Revolution and banned until 1799.

== Performance history ==
Méhul in 1799; portrait by Antoine Gros

The opera was originally entitled Adrien, empereur de Rome and the premiere was scheduled for 13 March 1792. Hoffman had no political message in mind but the first act contained a scene in which the Emperor Hadrian celebrates a triumph. At the time, France felt under threat from Austria, whose Emperor Leopold II had just died. Rumours also spread that the horses to be used in the triumph were from the stables of Marie-Antoinette, the deeply unpopular French queen and Leopold's sister. Many Parisians began to express their displeasure at the forthcoming opera and on 12 March - in spite of the protests of the Opéra, which had invested large sums of money in the production - the political authorities intervened and banned the performance of Adrien to prevent a possible riot. A storm of controversy broke out in the press as Hoffman refused to change his libretto, appealing to the law of 1791 which had freed French theatres from censorship as well as the Declaration of the Rights of Man and of the Citizen. Nevertheless, the premiere was replaced by a revival of Piccinni's Atys.

In October 1798, the Opéra decided to try again and asked Méhul to revise the work for a performance scheduled for the following year. The revision and rehearsals took place under the supervision of the Minister of the Police, Jean-Pierre Duval, who advised Méhul to drop the word "emperor" from the title. Hadrian was demoted from an emperor to a general and his triumphal march was cut. When the premiere finally took place on 4 June 1799, the critics acclaimed Adrien as a masterpiece. However, the opera's political woes were not yet at an end. Members of the Council of Five Hundred thought the work was an allusion to Napoleon Bonaparte and the current state of France. On 16 June, the Minister of the Interior, Lucien Bonaparte, withdrew Adrien from the stage after only four performances. It only reappeared in February 1800.

Berlioz, an admirer of the composer, referred to Adrien as "a fine unpublished score."

A concert performance of the 1799 version of Adrien, conducted by György Vashegyi, was given in Budapest in June 2012. The performance was recorded and subsequently released by Ediciones Singulares in 2014.

== Music ==
The revised 1799 version borrowed its overture from an earlier Méhul opera, Horatius Coclès (1794). Dry recitative, with only the simplest of orchestral accompaniment, predominates in the early part of the opera, possibly as a way of allowing the singers more freedom in their declamation. Musical numbers become more frequent as the score progresses. The score shows the influence of the Sturm und Drang style popular during the French Revolutionary era - and already present in operas such as Johann Christoph Vogel's La toison d'or (1786).

== Roles ==
| Role | Voice type | Premiere Cast, 4 June 1799 |
|---|---|---|
| Adrien | haute-contre | Étienne Lainez (or Lainé) |
| Flaminius, a consul | basse-taille (bass-baritone) | Dufresne |
| Sabine, a Roman lady engaged to Adrien | soprano | Marie-Thérèse Maillard |
| Rutile, a military tribune | basse-taille (bass-baritone) | Moreau |
| Cosroès, King of the Parthians | basse-taille (bass-baritone) | Martin-Joseph Adrien |
| Émirène, daughter of Cosroès | soprano | Henri |
| Pharnaspe, a Parthian prince in love with Émirène | haute-contre | Jean-Joseph Rousseau |
Followers of Sabine, followers of Émirène, Syrian sacrificial priests, six old Syrian men, three captive Parthian princes, twelve lictors, two victimarii, four Syrian priests, thirty-six Praetorian guards and Roman soldiers, twenty-seven Parthian soldiers, eighteen young pupils playing Parthian soldiers, two young camilli, six musicians, eight standard-bearers

== Synopsis ==
=== Act One ===
Scene: Part of the city of Antioch
Adrien has just defeated the Parthians and captured the princess Émirène. Her father, King Cosroès, and fiancé, Prince Pharnaspe, attempt to free her. They offer Adrien a ransom but he refuses; the emperor is in love with Émirène himself and wants to marry her. The Parthians attack Antioch, but the Romans defeat them again and capture Pharnaspe.

=== Act Two ===
Scene: A mountain with a cave and a temple to the goddess Derceto
Émirène successfully pleads with Adrien to save Pharnaspe's life. However, Adrien still intends to marry her and banishes Pharnaspe from Antioch. At this point, news comes that Adrien's own fiancée, Sabine, is about to arrive in the city. Sabine learns of Adrien's new love and plots for Émirène and Pharnaspe to escape together. Cosroès and a band of his followers try to enter Antioch secretly in a bid to assassinate Adrien but they are prevented. Adrien blames Pharnaspe for the conspiracy against his life.

=== Act Three ===
Scene: Adrien's palace in Antioch
Sabine scornfully prepares to leave Adrien and return to Rome by sea. Adrien tells Cosroès he will spare his life if he will give Adrien his daughter's hand in marriage. Cosroès pretends to agree. Pharnaspe begs Émirène to marry Adrien to save her father. News comes that Adrien has been crowned new emperor of Rome. Adrien shows his magnanimity by freeing Cosroès and allowing Pharnaspe and Émirène to marry. He asks Sabine to become his empress and declares peace between the Romans and Parthians.

== Recording ==
- Adrien (1799 version) Philippe Do (Adrien), Gabrielle Philiponet (Émirène), Jennifer Borghi (Sabine), Philippe Talbot (Pharnaspe), Purcell Choir, Orfeo Orchestra, conducted by György Vashegyi (Ediciones Singulares, 2014)

== Sources ==
- Booklet notes to the Vashegyi recording by Alexandre Dratwicki
- Adélaïde de Place Étienne Nicolas Méhul (Bleu Nuit Éditeur, 2005)
- Hector Berlioz, Evenings with the Orchestra, translated by Jacques Barzun (University of Chicago Press, 1973; 1999 reprint)
