= Euphrosine =

Opera by Étienne-Nicolas Méhul

- Opera by Étienne Méhul
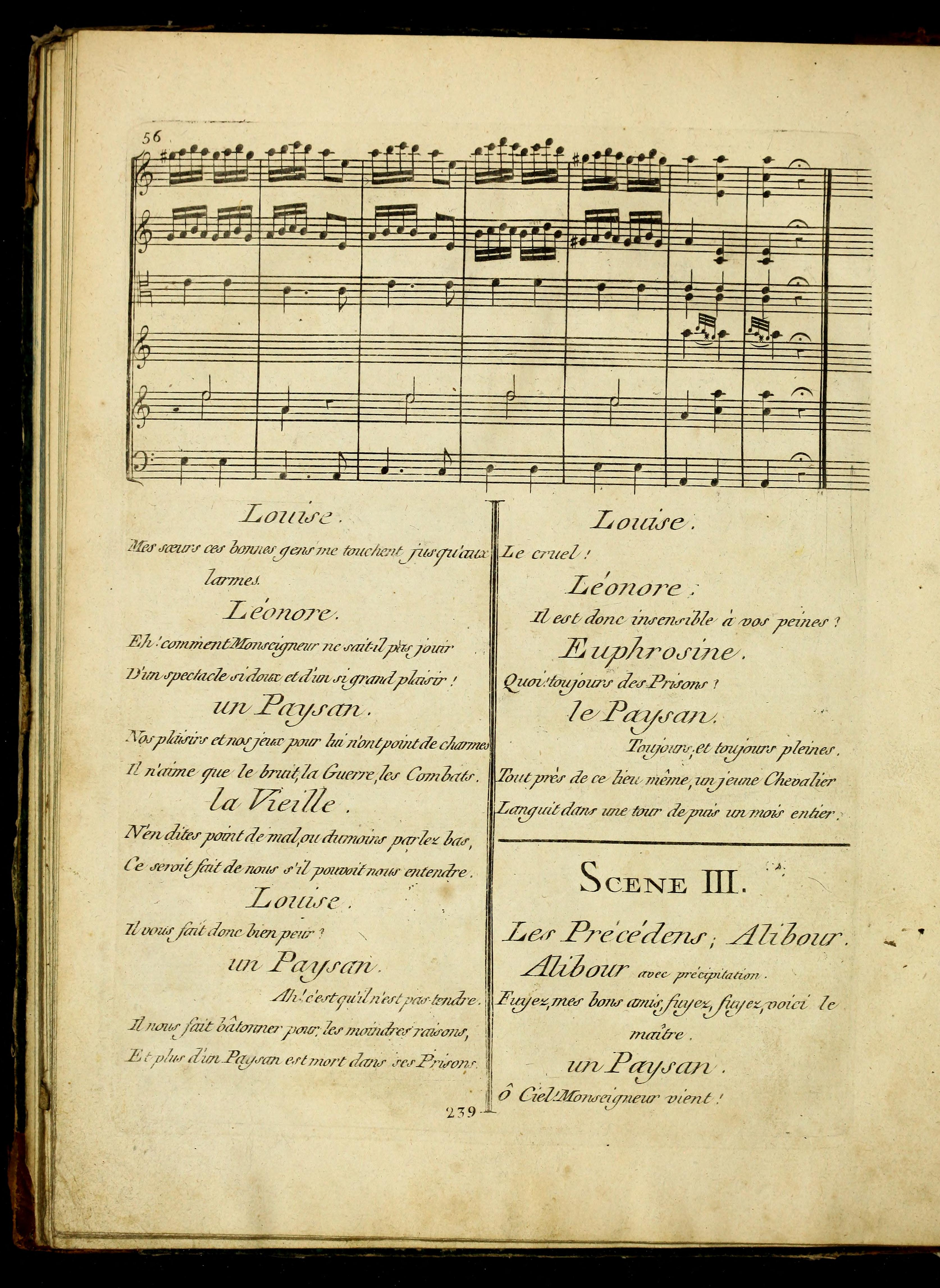
- Page from the original 1790 score, showing the characteristic combination of spoken dialogue and music
- Librettist: François-Benoît Hoffman
- Language: French
- Premiere: 4 September 1790; Comédie-Italienne (first Salle Favart), Paris

Euphrosine, ou Le tyran corrigé (Euphrosine, or The Tyrant Reformed) is an opera, designated as a 'comédie mise en musique', by the French composer Étienne Nicolas Méhul with a libretto by François-Benoît Hoffman. It was the first of Méhul's operas to be performed, and established his reputation as a leading composer of his time. The premiere was given by the Comédie-Italienne at the first Salle Favart in Paris on 4 September 1790.

== Performance history ==
Euphrosine was not the first opera that Méhul had written. The Académie Royale de Musique (the Paris Opéra) had accepted his work Cora in 1789, but rehearsals had been abandoned on 8 August of that year, probably because of the Académie's financial difficulties. Méhul turned instead to the Opéra-Comique, offering the theatre a new opera, Euphrosine, with a libretto by François-Benoît Hoffman, who would collaborate with the composer on many more works in the 1790s.

The premiere, on 4 September 1790, was a great success, praised by critics such as the composer André Grétry. The original version was the first ever opéra comique to have five acts, but Méhul and Hoffman later trimmed it down to three acts in 1792/1793 and completely revised the third act in order to get rid of the comic elements in 1795 (after Euphrosine, Méhul preferred to compose works which were either comedies or tragedies, but not a mixture of the two).

== Roles ==
Méhul in 1799; portrait by Antoine Gros

Roles, voice types, premiere cast
Role	Voice type	Premiere cast, 4 September 1790
Coradin, a feudal tyrant	tenor	Philippe Cauvy, known as "Philippe"
La comtesse d'Arles (the Countess of Arles)	soprano	
Euphrosine, daughter of the Comte de Sabran	soprano	Jeanne-Charlotte Schroeder (known as "Madame Saint-Aubin")
Léonore, daughter of the Comte de Sabran	soprano	Rose Renaud
Louise, daughter of the Comte de Sabran	soprano	Sophie Renaud
Alibour, Coradin's doctor	baritone	Jean-Pierre Solié
Caron, a jailor	haute-contre	Antoine Trial
Une vieille femme (An old woman)	soprano	
Un vieillard (An old man)		
Chorus of peasants, shepherds, shepherdesses, guards and soldiers

== Synopsis ==
The opera is set in Provence at the time of the Crusades. The tyrant Coradin is the guardian of three orphaned girls, including Euphrosine, who live in his castle. Euphrosine decides to persuade Coradin to marry her so she can reform his character. But the Countess of Arles is jealous of Euphrosine and turns Coradin against her, encouraging him to give her poison. The doctor warns Euphrosine about the plot against her life and she merely pretends to die of the poison. Believing he has killed Euphrosine, Coradin is suddenly seized with remorse. He asks the doctor to prepare him some more poison so he can commit suicide. At this point Euphrosine enters, alive and well, and forgives Coradin, who agrees to marry her.

== The work and its influence ==
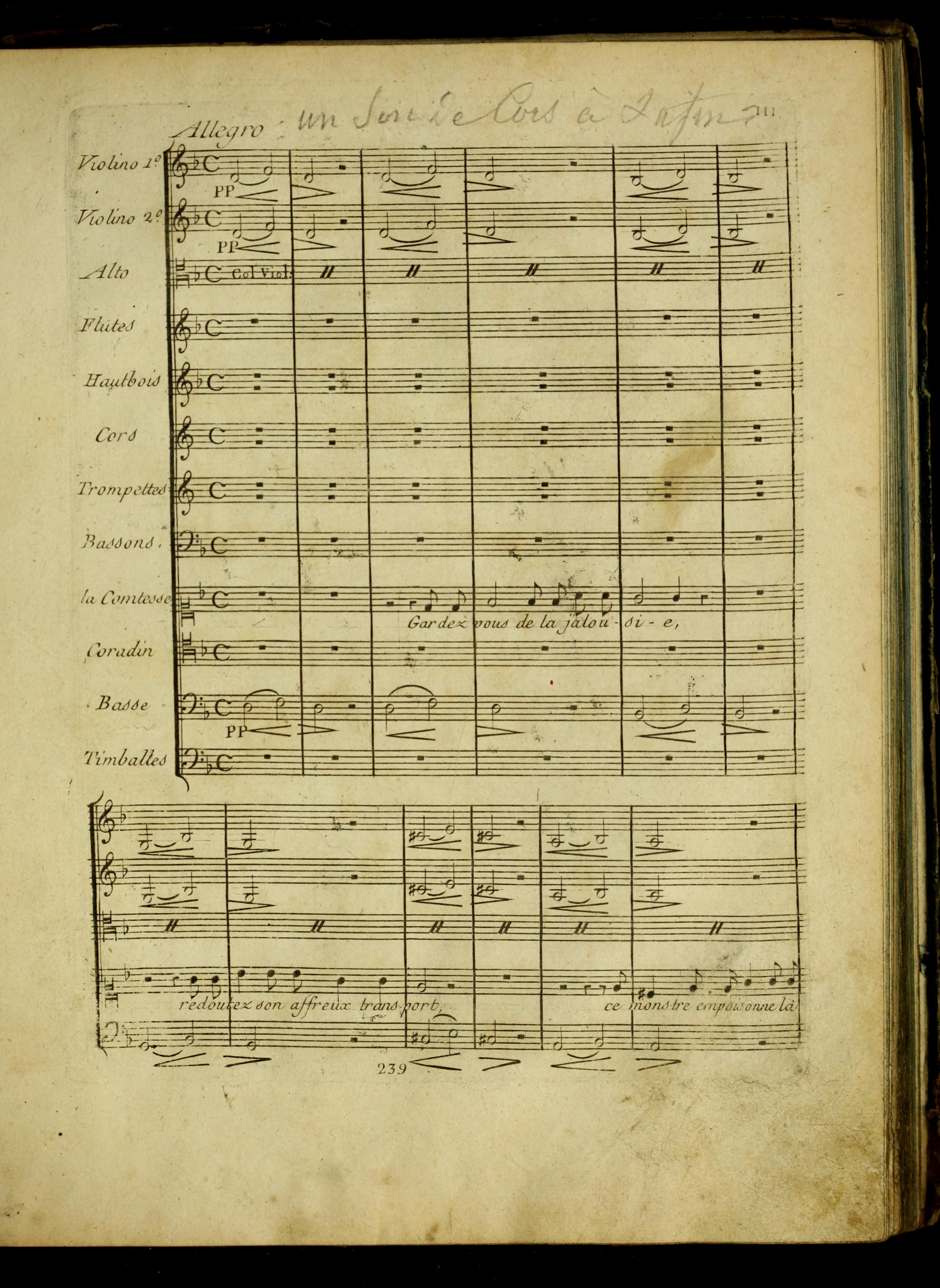
The beginning of the legendary duet "Gardez-vous de la jalousie"

Winton Dean has described Euphrosine as "an uneven work that reveals the sources of [Méhul's] style (Grétry, the Neapolitans, Haydn, but not much Gluck) before the full impact of Cherubini or the Revolution. It has a brilliantly witty libretto by François Hoffman, in which the young heroine sets out to tame the surly tyrant Coradin in the manner of Anne Whitefield in Man and Superman ... much of the music is as light-fingered as the libretto; but the emotions of jealousy and remorse released in Méhul a remarkable concentration of power and originality, as they were often to do later (for example in the characters of Othon in Ariodant and Siméon in Joseph).

Dean is one of many critics who have singled out the "Jealousy Duet" (Gardez-vous de la jalousie) in Act II for particular praise. Hector Berlioz wrote that "this amazing piece is the worthy paraphrase of Iago's speech: 'Beware of jealousy, it is the green-eyed monster,' in the Othello of Shakespeare" and recounted the anecdote that when Grétry heard the piece at the dress rehearsal he exclaimed: "It's enough to break open the roof of the house with the skulls of the audience." David Charlton comments that the duet "established a new standard of psychological realism for the post-Gluckian age."

Berlioz regarded Euphrosine as Méhul's masterpiece: "It has grace, delicacy, dash, plenty of dramatic movement, and passionate outbursts of terrific violence and veracity. The character of Euphrosine is delightful, that of the physician Alibour of a somewhat satirical geniality. As for the rugged knight Coradin, everything he sings is magnificently headlong." Berlioz was not the only Romantic composer to be impressed by Euphrosine. Edward J. Dent suggested that the plot had a great influence on Carl Maria von Weber's Euryanthe (1823).
