= François-Benoît Hoffman =

French playwright and critic

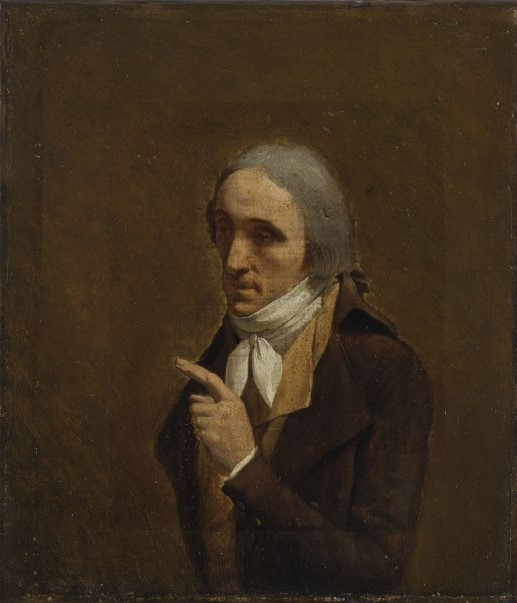
Portrait by Louis-Léopold Boilly, c. 1800

François-Benoît Hoffman (French pronunciation: [fʁɑ̃swa bənwa ɔfman]; 11 July 1760 – 25 April 1828) was a French playwright and critic, best known today for his operatic librettos, including those set to music by Étienne Méhul and Luigi Cherubini (most notably Cherubini's Médée, 1797).

== Career ==
Hoffman was born in Nancy, and studied law at the University of Strasbourg. Believing that his stammer hindered his legal career, he entered military service in Corsica. He served there for only a very short time, and, returning to Nancy, wrote some poems which brought him into notice at the little court of Lunéville over which the Marquise de Boufflers then presided. In 1784 he went to Paris where he wrote his first opera libretto, Phèdre, for the composer Jean-Baptiste Lemoyne. It was performed at Fontainebleau in October 1786. After quarrelling with Lemoyne, Hoffman offered his libretto Adrien, empereur de Rome to Cherubini, who turned it down in favour of another Hoffman drama, Médée. Adrien was accepted instead by Méhul, with whom Hoffman collaborated on several operas, including Euphrosine (1790), Stratonice (1792) and Ariodant (1799).

Hoffman was a strong advocate of authors' rights regarding artistic control, copyright and freedom of speech. This stance often brought him into conflict with the authorities. A quarrel with the management of the Paris Opéra over Nephté led to them rejecting Médée in 1790. In 1792, the French Revolutionary government objected to Adrien on political grounds, and Hoffman ran considerable risk by refusing to make the changes proposed to him. It was seven years before Adrien finally received its premiere at the Opéra.

Hoffman's later operas were in a lighter style than his works of the 1790s. A notable example is Les rendez-vous bourgeois, with music by Isouard. In 1807 he was invited by Charles Guillaume Étienne to contribute to the Journal de l'Empire (afterwards the Journal des Débats). Hoffman's wide reading qualified him to write on all sorts of subjects, and he turned, apparently with no difficulty, from reviewing books on medicine to violent attacks on the Jesuits. His severe criticism of Chateaubriand's Les Martyrs led the author to make some changes in a later edition. He had the reputation of being an absolutely conscientious and incorruptible critic and thus exercised wide influence.

Hoffman's poem Je te perds, fugitive espérance was set by Ludwig van Beethoven in 1806 in his song Als die Geliebte sich trennen wollten (WoO 132) in a translation by Stephan von Breuning.

== Works ==
Théâtre

- Phèdre, tragédie lyrique en 3 actes, music by Lemoyne, premiere 26 October 1786 au château de Fontainebleau;
- Nephté, tragédie lyrique en 3 actes, music by Lemoyne, premiere 15 December 1789 at the Opéra de Paris;
- Euphrosine, ou le Tyran corrigé, comédie en 5 actes mise en musique by Étienne Nicolas Méhul, premiere 4 October 1790 at the Comédie-Italienne (réduite à 4, puis à 3 actes);
- Adrien, opéra en 3 actes, music by Étienne Nicolas Méhul, premiere January 1792, puis sous une forme révisée en 1802;
- Stratonice, comédie héroïque en un acte et en vers, music by Étienne Nicolas Méhul, premiere 3 May 1792 at the Comédie-Italienne;
- Le jeune sage et le vieux fou, comédie en un acte mêlée de musique by Étienne Nicolas Méhul premiere 28 March 1793 at the Opéra-Comique;
- Adélaïde, drame en 3 actes et en vers premiere 1793;
- Callias, drame en un acte et en vers premiere 1795;
- Le Brigand, opéra-comique en 3 actes premiere 1795;
- Azeline, comédie en 3 actes premiere 1797;
- Médée, opéra en 3 actes, music by Luigi Cherubini, premiere 1797 at the Théâtre Feydeau;
- Ariodant, drame en 3 actes mêlé de musique by Étienne Nicolas Méhul, premiere 11 October 1799 at the Opéra-Comique;
- Bion, comédie en un acte mêlée de musique by Étienne Nicolas Méhul, premiere 27 December 1800 at the Opéra-Comique;
- Lisistrata, ou Les Athéniennes, Comédie en un acte et en prose, mêlée de vaudevilles imitée d'Aristophane, premiere 15 January 1802 at the Théâtre Feydeau;
- Le Trésor supposé ou le Danger d’écouter aux portes, comédie en un acte mêlée de musique by Étienne Nicolas Méhul, premiere 29 July 1802 à l'Opéra-Comique;
- Le Roman d’une heure, comédie en un acte premiere Gymnase 1803;
- La Ruse inutile, opéra-comique en 2 actes premiere 1805;
- Grimaldi, comédie en 3 actes, music by Rodolphe Kreutzer, premiere 1810.
- La mort d'Abel, opera with music by Rodolphe Kreutzer, premiere 1810 (revised 1825)

Romans, essais

- Mes souvenirs ou Recueil de pensées fugitives (1802);

== Sources ==
- L. Castel: Notice Biographique et Littéraire sur F.-B. Hoffman, dans: Œuvres de F. B. Hoffman précédées d’une Notice sur sa vie. Théatre. Tome 2. S. V-LV.
- P.[aul?] Jacquinet: François Benoît Hoffman: sa vie, ses œuvres, Nancy 1878.
- Stratonice: introduction to the edition of Hoffman and Méhul's opera by M. Elizabeth C. Bartlet (Pendragon Press, 1997)
- T. G. Waidelich: ...imitée d’Aristophane". Die Lisistrata von Hoffman und Solié (1802) als Bindeglied zu den Verschwornen von Castelli und Schubert mit einem Ausblick auf die Rezeption des Sujets im Musiktheater (Teil 1). In: Schubert:Perspektiven. 9, 2010, p. 216–228.
