= Jean-Pierre Solié =

French opera singer (1755–1812)

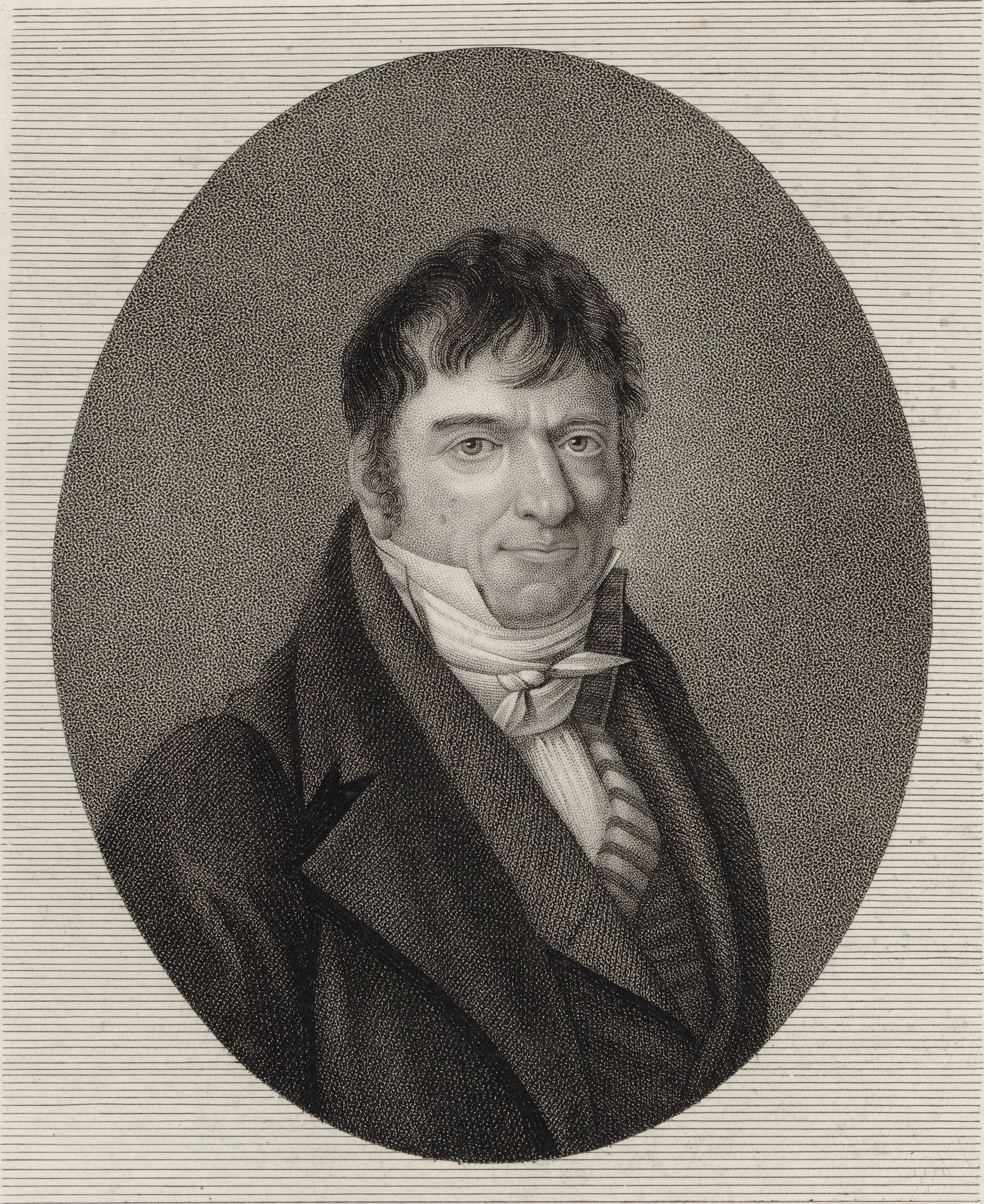
Jean-Pierre Solié

Jean-Pierre Solié (also Soulier, Solier, Sollié; 1755 in Nîmes – 6 August 1812 in Paris) was a French cellist and operatic singer. He began as a tenor, but switched and became well known as a baritone. He sang most often at the Paris Opéra-Comique. He also became a prolific composer, writing primarily one-act comic operas.

== Career as a singer ==
His father was a cellist with the orchestra at the theatre in Nîmes, and Solié likewise learned to play the cello. But he also learned to sing and play the guitar, and became a choirboy in the cathedral. As he got older he began traveling to nearby towns in southern France, where he played cello in local theatre orchestras and supplemented his income by giving lessons in guitar and singing. In 1778 in Avignon he was called upon to replace an ailing tenor in André Grétry's La Rosière de Salency and made such a good impression, he was hired to sing tenor roles. Later he was asked to go to Paris to perform two roles with the Opéra-Comique, where he first sang in Pierre-Alexandre Monsigny's Félix on 31 August 1782 and later in Grétry's L'amant jaloux. His success was limited, and he returned to the provinces, working and singing in Nancy and Lyon.

By 1787 he was back in Paris performing minor roles, but on 26 March 1789 he replaced Jean-Baptiste Clairval with great success in the premiere of Girard de Propiac's La fausse paysanne. By this time his voice was becoming more that of a baritone. Baritones were somewhat unusual at that time at the Opéra-Comique, but the composer Étienne Méhul began creating leading baritone roles for Solié, including Alibour in Euphrosine (4 September 1790), Erasistrate in Stratonice (3 May 1792), and Jacob in Joseph (17 February 1807). Grétry also had a high regard for Solié, in particular as an actor: "l'excellent acteur, le citoyen Solier".

== Career as a composer ==
Solié apparently composed some music for a comedy, Le séducteur, in 1783, and it was presented at Fontainebleau on 4 November 1783. His career as a composer, however, really began in 1790 with an adaptation he prepared of Christoph Willibald Gluck's La rencontre imprévue, which Solié called Les fous de Médine, and for which he composed several original pieces including parodies of music by Henri Montan Berton and Gluck. In May 1792 he participated in a collaboration with Rodolphe Kreutzer called Le franc Breton, but his first important totally independent work came in November with Jean et Geneviève. The opera was revived several times, receiving its final performance in 1822. Solié also participated in the collaborative Revolutionary opera Le congrès des rois, a 3-act comédie mêlée d'ariettes, which was composed by order of the Comité du Salut public (Committee of Public Safety) and was hurriedly put together in just two days. The work combined music written by Solié and 11 other composers and was first performed by the Opéra-Comique at the Salle Favart on 26 February 1794. It was poorly received and was soon banned by the Revolutionary authorities.

== Significance as a composer ==
The music historian Paulette Letailleur has written: "Although pleasant and facile, Solié’s compositional style was not assertive enough to achieve lasting success. He is, however, remembered for Le secret (103 performances between 1801 and 1814) and Le jockey, works which owe much to the librettist [François-Benoît] Hoffman, Le diable à quatre (95 performances) and for occasional pieces such as L’opéra au village (1807), written for the emperor's return and the signing of the peace."

== Descendants ==
Solié's second son, Emile Solié (9 April 1801, Paris – after 1867, Ancenis?), became an author who wrote about music (see Other sources). Emile's son Charles (died after 1912) was a conductor and director in the 1860s at the Théâtre Graslin in Nantes. Subsequently he conducted at the Théâtre-Français in Nice. He was also a composer: his comic opera Schein Baba, ou L'intrigue au harem was well received when it was performed in Nice on 5 April 1879.

== List of stage works ==
This list of works for the stage was compiled from Wild and Charlton with additional works, primarily those not performed at the Opéra-Comique, from Letailleur as noted. Printed works were published in Paris. Library and shelf marks provided by Wild and Charlton are shown in parentheses. Listings of works for which libretto and score have not been found are based on company registers or other sources. Abbreviations: AN, Archives Nationales, Paris; BMO, Bibliothèque-Musée de l'Opéra, Paris; BMR, Bibliothèque municipale de Rouen; BNF, Bibliothèque nationale de France (Départements des Imprimés, des Manuscrits et de la Musique).

1. Le séducteur, a 5-act comedy with text by G.-F. Bièvre, was first performed at Fontainebleau on 4 November 1783.
2. Les arts et l'amitié, a 1-act comedy with music by Solié, Henri-Montan Berton, and Jean-Paul-Egide Martini and text by Armand de Bouchard, was first performed by the Opéra-Comique at the Salle Favart on 5 August 1788. It included four pieces of music: Aria No. 1 (Solié), No. 2 (Berton), No. 3 (Martini), No. 4 (unknown). It was probably performed again up to about 1793. The text (BNF: 8º Yth. 1277; 1788 edition), and the full score (BMR: Fonds 08, Th. 42) were published.
  - The work was later transformed into a 1-act comic opera with music by Louis-Emmanuel Jadin and libretto by Armand de Bouchard, which was first performed by the Opéra-Comique at the Salle Feydeau on 9 June 1807 for a total of 6 performances.
3. Les fous de Médine, ou La rencontre imprévue, a 3-act opéra bouffon with a libretto by Louis Dancourt. The music includes parodies of pieces by Berton and Gluck. The opera was performed for the first and last time by the Opéra-Comique at the Salle Favart on 1 May 1790. The libretto and the score have not been found.
  - Solié's opera was an adaption of Gluck's opera La rencontre imprévue, which had been performed in Vienna in 1764.
  - A prior version of the libretto had been published by Dancourt in 1776 under the title La rencontre imprévue.
4. Le franc Breton, a 1-act opera composed in collaboration with Rodolphe Kreutzer with a libretto by Jean-Élie Dejaure, was first performed by the Opéra-Comique at the Salle Favart on 3 November 1792 with further performances up to 1801. The full score (BNF: D. 3078) was published.
  - The opera is a lyric adaptation of a comedy by Dejaure called Le Franc Breton ou le Négociant de Nantes, which had been performed by the Comédiens Italiens on 9 February 1791. The text (BNF: series X. 1282, t. 27, 1791 edition and ms) was published and also exists in manuscript form.
5. Jean et Geneviève, a 1-act comédie mise en musique with a libretto by Edmond-Guillaume-François de Favières, was first performed by the Opéra-Comique at the Salle Favart on 3 December 1792 with a revival at the Salle Feydeau on 12 October 1801, and further performances up to 1822. The libretto (BNF: Thb 4146; 1810 edition) and full score (BNF: L. 2207) were published. The libretto gives the genre as opéra-comique mêlé d'ariettes.
6. L'école de village was a 1-act opéra comique en vaudeville with 10 pieces attributed to Solié, including airs parodiés and vaudevilles. Among the composers parodied are Nicolas Dalayrac and André Grétry. The libretto (BNF: Thb. 2975) by Sewrin was published, but the score has not been found. The work was first performed by the Opéra-Comique at the Salle Favart on 10 May 1793 and was given a total of two times.
7. La moisson, a 2-act opéra comique en vaudeville with a libretto by Charles Augustin de Bassompierre Sewrin, was first performed by the Opéra-Comique in the Salle Favart on 5 September 1793, with further performances up to 1794. The composer Nicolas Dalayrac has been identified as one of those parodied. The libretto (BNF: Thb. 3793) was published.
8. Le plaisir et la gloire, a 1-act scéne patriotiques mêlée de chants with a libretto by Charles Augustin de Bassompierre Sewrin, was first performed by the Opéra-Comique at the Salle Favart on 19 January 1794 and was performed a total of 19 times. The libretto (BNF: Thb. 4143) was published, but the score has not been found.
  - This patriotic piece concludes with "La Marseillaise," canon shots, "La Générale," and the sounding of the tocsin (alarm bell).
9. Le congrès des rois, a 3-act comédie mêlée d'ariettes with music by Solié and 11 other composers and a libretto by Antoine-François Èvre, was first performed by the Opéra-Comique in the Salle Favart on 26 February 1794 [8 vent II]. The full score and the libretto have not been found. A manuscript vocal score with music by Henri Montan Berton (BNF: Ms. 3649) has been located.
10. L'entreprise folle, a 1-act comic opera, was first performed by the Opéra-Comique in the Salle Favart in 1795.
11. La soubrette, ou L'étui de harpe, a 1-act comédie with a libretto by François-Benoît Hoffman, was first performed by the Opéra-Comique in the Salle Favart on 3 December 1795, with further performances in 1796. The libretto and score have not been found.
12. Le jockei (also written Le jockey), a 1-act opéra with a libretto by François-Benoît Hoffman, was first performed by the Opéra-Comique in the Salle Favart on 6 January 1796, and was revived at the Salle Feydeau on 7 October 1801, with further performances up to 1807. The libretto (BNF: Thb. 4150) and full score (BNF: L. 1902) were published. The libretto gives the genre as comédie mêlée d'ariettes.
13. Le secret, a 1-act opéra with a libretto by François-Benoît Hoffman, was first performed by the Opéra-Comique in the Salle Favart on 20 April 1796. It was revived in the Salle Feydeau on 21 September 1801, with further performances up to 1824. The libretto (BNF: Thb. 4152; an IV [1797] edition) and the full score (BNF: D. 14020; 1796 edition) were published. The libretto gives the genre as comédie mêlée de musique. It is based on the comedy La femme jalouse by François-Antoine Jolly.
14. Les trois tantes with a libretto by René Charles Guilbert de Pixérécourt was accepted by the Théâtre Feydeau in 1797 but never performed.
15. Azeline, a 3-act comédie mêlée de musique with a libretto by François-Benoît Hoffman after Les Ruses innocentes by the Count of Barthélemy Imbert, was first performed by the Opéra-Comique in the Salle Favart on 5 December 1796, with further performances up to 1799. The libretto (BNF: Th. 376) and the score of one musical number (BNF: 4º Y. 317 (1)) were published. The work was later reduced to 2 acts (date unknown), and the libretto of that version (BNF: series X. 1282, t. 28) was also published in "an V" according to a handwritten note.
16. Victor, a drame lyrique with a libretto by René Charles Guilbert de Pixérécourt was accepted by the Théâtre Feydeau in 1797 but never performed.
17. La femme de quarante-cinq ans, a 1-act comédie mêlée de musique with a libretto by François-Benoît Hoffman, was performed for the first and last time by the Opéra-Comique in the Salle Favart on 19 November 1798. The libretto (BNF: Thb. 3210) was published, but the score has not been found. The following is noted on the libretto: "Sifflée, pour la premiere et dernière fois, sur le Théâtre Favart, le 29 brumaire an 7. Dédiée aux siffleurs et enrichie de notes, à l'usage des jeunes auteurs". ("Booed, for the first and last time, at the Théâtre Favart, 29 Brumaire, year 7. Dedicated to the booers and with added notes for the use of young writers".)
18. Le chapitre second, a 1-act comic opera with a libretto (comédie mêlée d'ariettes) by Emmanuel Dupaty, was first performed by the Opéra-Comique in the Salle Favart on 17 June 1799. It was revived at the Salle Feydeau on 8 August 1803, with further performances up to 1810. The libretto (BNF: Thb. 2538) and full score (BNF: D. 14007) were published. A libretto with handwritten corrections (BNF: series X. 1282, t. 28, an V edition) also exists.
19. Une matinée de Voltaire, ou La famille Calas à Paris, a 1-act drame lyrique (according to Magasin encyclopédique, an VI (1), pp. 555–556) with a libretto by Jean-Baptiste Pujoulx, was first performed by the Opéra-Comique in the Salle Favart on 22 May 1800. It was presented a total of 4 times. The libretto and score have not been located.
  - The libretto was based on the play La Veuve Calas à Paris by Pujoulx, first performed by the Comédiens Italiens on 31 July 1791.
20. Une nuit d'été, ou Un peu d'aide fait grand bien, a 1-act comic opera with a libretto by Nicolas Gersin, was first performed by the Opéra-Comique in the Salle Favart on 7 June 1800.
21. Oui, ou Le double rendez-vous, a 1-act opéra with a libretto by J.F.-T. Goulard, was first performed by the Opéra-Comique in the Salle Favart on 29 August 1800.
22. La rivale d'elle-même, a 1-act comic opera with a libretto by P.-J.-R. Bins de Saint-Victor, was first performed by the Opéra-Comique in the Salle Favart on 3 October 1800.
23. La pluie et le beau temps, ou L'été de l'an VIII, a 1-act vaudeville with a libretto by Dupaty, was first performed by the Opéra-Comique in the Salle Favart on 17 November 1800.
24. Le petit Jacquot, a 1-act comic opera with a libretto by Alexandre, was first performed by the Théâtre des Jeunes-Artistes (in the rue de Bondy) on 27 April 1801.
25. Quatre maris pour un a 1-act comic opera with a libretto by René Charles Guilbert de Pixérécourt, was first performed by the Théâtre des Jeunes-Artistes (in the rue de Bondy) on 27 April 1801.
26. Lisistrata, ou Les athéniennes. a 1-act comédie mêlée de vaudevilles imitée d'Aristophane with a libretto by François-Benoît Hoffman. The story is based on the play Lysistrata by Aristophanes. It was performed for the first and last time by the Opéra-Comique in the Salle Feydeau on 15 January 1802. The libretto was published, but the score has not been found.
  - The production was closed by order of the authorities. The author included the following statement with the libretto: "Je déclare donc que je ne songerai à remettre cette pièce au théâtre, que quand je saurai combien de censures un autour doit subir, combien de fois il doit faire des corrections par ordre, combien de personnes ont le droit de lui en prescrire, et quel'âge doit avoir une comédie pour être assimilée à l'ancien répertoire qu'on ne corrige plus". ("I therefore declare that I will not think of staging this piece again until I know how many drafts an author must submit to the censor, how many times he must make corrections to order, how many persons have the right to require them of him, and how old a comedy must be to be adopted into the existing repertoire which is no longer corrected".)
27. Plutarque, a 1-act comic opera with a libretto by François-Pierre-Auguste Léger and René de Chazet, was first performed by the Opéra-Comique in the Salle Feydeau on 20 January 1802.
28. Le séducteur amoureux, a 3-act comédie with a libretto by C. de Longchamp, was first performed at the Théâtre-Français on 25 January 1803 and published in 1803.
29. Henriette et Verseuil, a 1-act comédie mêlée de chant with a libretto by P. Guillet and Eugéne Hus, was first performed by the Opéra-Comique in the Salle Feydeau on 30 July 1803. It was performed a total of 5 times. The libretto was published, and the score has not been found. Eugéne Hus is only mentioned in the libretto for providing the words for three of the songs.
30. L'incertitude maternelle, ou Le choix impossible, a 1-act comic opera with music by Solié and André Grétry and a libretto by Jean-Claude Dejaure, was first performed by the Opéra-Comique in the Salle Feydeau on 6 August 1803 with further performances up to 1810. The libretto and vocal score were published. The libretto was adapted from a play of the same name by Dejaure's father which was given by the Comédiens Italiens on 5 June 1790. The text of the play was published in 1790, and there is a prompter's manuscript as well.
31. L'oncle etle neveu, a 1-act comic opera with a libretto by A.-J. Grétry, was first performed at the Théâtre des Variétés-Montansier on 26 November 1803.
32. L'époux généroux, ou Le pouvoir des procédés, a 1-act comédie which was a lyric adaption of a play by Jean-Claude Dejaure, which was first performed by the Comédiens Italiens on 15 February 1790. There is an indication on the manuscript of the libretto: "Remise en opéra-comique par Grétry neveu". The opera was first performed by the Opéra-Comique in the Salle Feydeau on 7 February 1804. Additional performances were given into 1805. The libretto and vocal score were published.
33. Louise, ou La malade par amour, a 1-act comic opera with a libretto by François-Benoît Hoffman, was first performed by the Opéra-Comique in the Salle Feydeau on 16 April 1804 and was given a total of 7 times. The libretto has not been found, but the vocal score was published.
  - The libretto is adapted from the same author's Stratonice with music by Étienne Méhul, first performed by the Opéra-Comique in the Salle Favart on 3 May 1792, which was based on De Dea Syria [On the Syrian Goddess] attributed to Lucian and Antiochus, a tragicomedy by Thomas Corneille.
34. Les deux oncles is a 1-act comédie with a libretto by André-Joseph Grétry, which was a lyric adaptation of a comedy by Nicholas-Julien Forgeot that was first performed by the Comédiens Italiens on 29 September 1780. The opera, which was first performed by the Opéra-Comique in the Salle Favart on 3 January 1805, was given a total of 10 times. The libretto exists in manuscript form, and the score has not been found.
35. Chacun son tour, a 1-act opera with a libretto by Justin Gensoul, was first performed by the Opéra-Comique in the Salle Feydeau on 26 October 1805. It was performed into 1806. The libretto was published (no date), and the score has not been found. It was described in Décade philosophique as: "A bad copy of Rivaux d'eux-mêmes, a pretty little piece by Pigault-Lebrun".
36. L'opéra au village, a 1-act divertissement with a libretto by Charles Augustin de Bassompierre Sewrin, was first performed by the Opéra-Comique in the Salle Feydeau on 30 July 1807 and published (no date).
37. L'amante sans le savoir, a 1-act comédie mêlée d'ariettes with a libretto by Auguste Creuzé de Lesser, was first performed by the Opéra-Comique in the Salle Feydeau on 10 August 1807. The title is taken from the register; on the manuscript of the libretto it is given as La leçon de père. It was performed a total of 5 times. The libretto was printed; the full score has not been found.
38. Anna, ou Les deux chaumières, a 1-act comédie mêlée d'ariettes with a libretto by Charles Augustin de Bassompierre Sewrin, was first performed by the Opéra-Comique in the Salle Feydeau on 20 February 1808. It was performed a total of 9 times. The vocal score and libretto were published (no date).
39. Mademoiselle de Guise, a 3-act comic opera with a libretto by Emmanuel Dupaty, was first performed by the Opéra-Comique in the Salle Feydeau on 17 March 1808 with further performances up to 1811. The libretto (BNF: Thb. 1665) and full score (BNF: D. 14037) were published.
40. Le hussard noir, a 1-act comic opera with a libretto by Emmanuel Dupaty, was performed for the first and last time by the Opéra-Comique in the Salle Feydeau on 10 December 1808. The libretto was published, and the score has not been found. The manuscript of the libretto gives the alternate title: Le Hussard noir ou le Sergent de Neiss – libretto after "un trait mis dans les journaux l'été dernier".
41. Le diable à quatre, ou La femme acariâtre, a 3-act comic opera with a libretto by Michel-Jean Sedaine revised by Auguste Creuzé de Lesser, was first performed by the Opéra-Comique in the Salle Feydeau on 30 November 1809. It was revived by the Théâtre Lyrique on 15 October 1853 in an orchestration by Adolphe Adam. The libretto exists both in manuscript (AN: AJ^{13} 1090) and printed form (BNF: Thb. 2891, 1809 edition), and the full score (BMO: F. 1667 (2); 1809 edition, indicated by a handwritten note) was also printed.
  - The libretto is based on an English ballad opera, The Devil to Pay, or The Wives Metamorphosed, by Charles Coffey. There were several prior comic opera versions of Sedaine's libretto, all with the title Le diable à quatre, ou La double métamorphose:
    1. The first had music by diverse composers which was premiered by the Opéra-Comique at the Foire Saint-Laurent on 19 August 1756 and later performed at the Hôtel de Bourgogne on 30 January 1764 with further performances up to 1776. The libretto (BNF: Thb. 1826 A) and vocal score (BNF: L. 2850) were published. The composers of various parodied musical numbers are identified as Ciampi, Duni, Galuppi, and G. Scarlatti (Pietro Alessandro Gaspare Scarlatti). Other pieces have been attributed to Jean-Louis Laruette and François-André Danican Philidor.
    2. Christoph Willibald Gluck prepared his own version for Vienna, altering music by the other composers and adding music of his own. This version was first performed in Laxenburg on 28 May 1759.
    3. A third had music by Bernardo Porto which was performed in the first Salle Favart on 14 February 1790 with further performances up to 1793. The libretto and vocal score have not been found.
42. La victime des arts, a 2-act comic opera composed in collaboration with Isouard and Henri Montan Berton with a libretto by L.-M. d'Estournel. was first performed by the Opéra-Comique in the Salle Feydeau on 27 February 1811.
43. Les ménestrels, a 3-act comic opera with a libretto by J. M. de Reveroni Saint-Cyr, was first performed by the Opéra-Comique in the Salle Feydeau on 27 April 1811.

== Sources ==
Cited sources

- Grétry, André (1812). Mémoires ou essais sur la musique (reprint of the 1st edition, 1789; revised and expanded with two additional volumes, an V [1797]). Paris: Verdière. Search results at the Internet Archive. OCLC 318075705. OCLC 2278913 (1797 edition).
- Pougin, Arthur (1891). L'Opéra-Comique pendant la Révolution de 1788 à 1801: d'après des documents inédits et les sources les plus authentiques. Paris: Albert Savine. View at Google Books.
- Sadie, Stanley, ed. (1992). The new Grove dictionary of opera (4 volumes). London: Macmillan. ISBN 978-1-56159-228-9.
- Sadie, Stanley, ed.; John Tyrell; exec. ed. (2001). The new Grove dictionary of music and musicians, 2nd ed. London: Macmillan. ISBN 978-1-56159-239-5 (hardcover). OCLC 419285866 (eBook).
- Walsh, T. J. (1981). Second Empire Opera: The Théâtre Lyrique Paris 1851–1870. New York: Riverrun Press. ISBN 978-0-7145-3659-0.
- Wild, Nicole; Charlton, David (2005). Théâtre de l'Opéra-Comique Paris: répertoire 1762–1972. Sprimont, Belgium: Editions Mardaga. ISBN 978-2-87009-898-1.
- Waidelich, T. G.; „…imitée d’Aristophane". Die Lisistrata von Hoffman und Solié (1802) als Bindeglied zu den Verschwornen von Castelli und Schubert mit einem Ausblick auf die Rezeption des Sujets im Musiktheater (Teil 1). In: Schubert:Perspektiven. 9, 2010, p. 216–228.

Other sources

- Campardon, Emile (1880). Les comédiens du roi de la troupe italienne pendant les deux derniers siècles. Paris: Berger-Levrault. View at Google Books.
- Pierre, Constant (1899). Musique des fetes et céremonies de la Révolution française. Paris: Imprimerie nationale. View at the Internet Archive.
- Pougin, Arthur (1891). L'Opéra-Comique pendant la Révolution de 1788 à 1801: d'après des documents inédits et les sources les plus authentiques. Paris: Albert Savine. View at Google Books.
- Solié, Emile (1847). Histoire du théâtre royal de l'Opéra-Comique. Paris: J. Frey. (in French) OCLC 4458775, 458931773.
- Solié, Emile (1847). Notice sur l'Opéra-National. Paris: J. Frey. (in French) Listing at Google Books.
