= Stratonice (opera) =

Opera by Étienne-Nicolas Méhul

- Opéra comique by Étienne Méhul
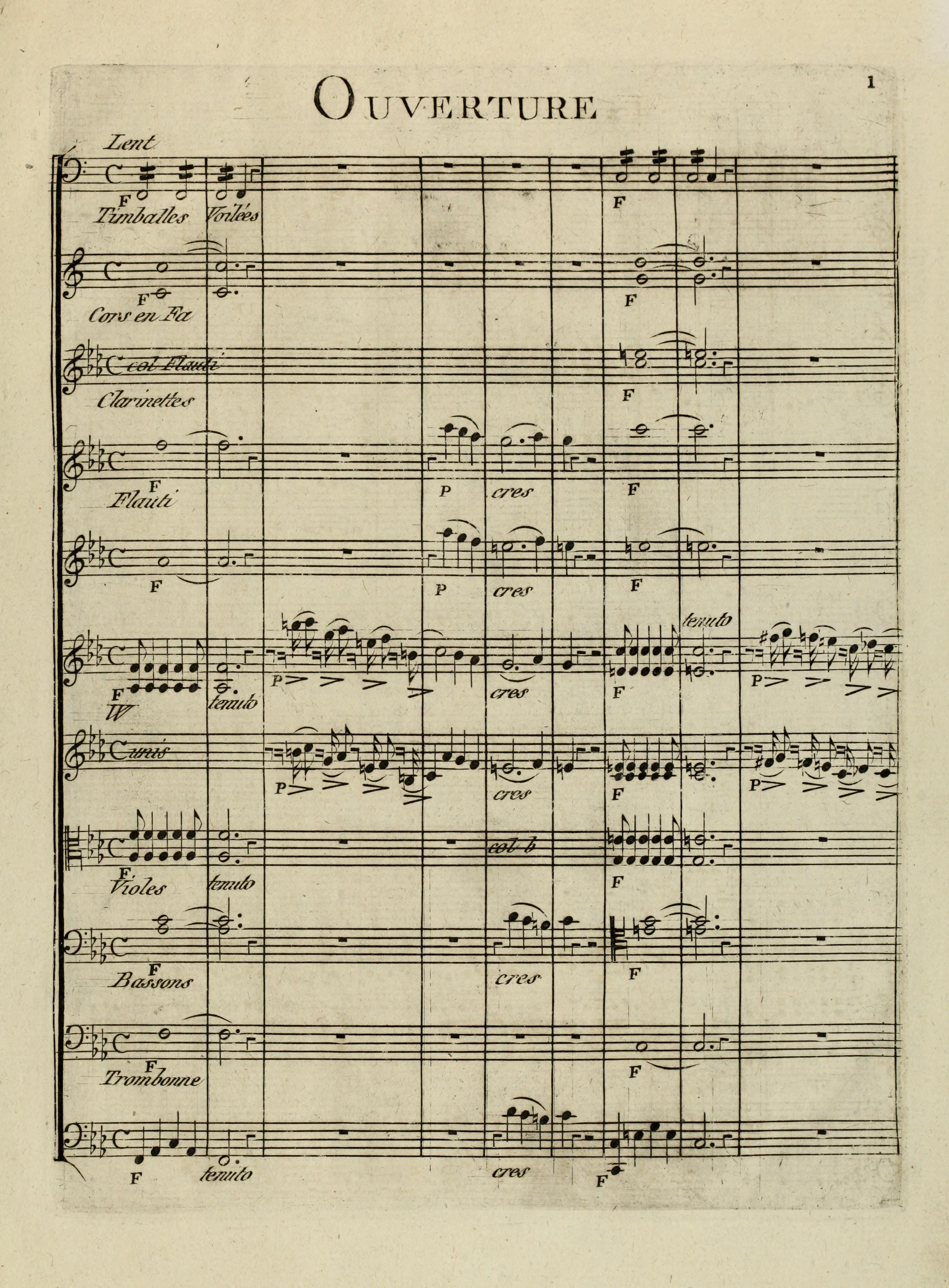
- First page of the score of the overture, 1792
- Librettist: François-Benoît Hoffman
- Language: French
- Based on: De Dea Syria, attributed to Lucian)
- Premiere: 3 May 1792; Opéra-Comique (Théâtre Favart), Paris

Stratonice is a one-act opéra comique by Étienne Méhul to a libretto by François-Benoît Hoffman, first performed at the Théâtre Favart in Paris, on 3 May 1792. The plot is taken from De Dea Syria ("On the Syrian Goddess", attributed to Lucian) concerning an incident from the history of the Seleucid dynasty which ruled much of the Middle East during the Hellenistic era of the ancient world.

== Performance history ==
Stratonice was a popular opera, receiving over 200 performances during Méhul's lifetime. On 6 June 1792, a parody titled Nice, by Jean-Baptiste Desprez and Alexandre de Ségur, appeared at the Théâtre du Vaudeville. In 1821, Méhul's nephew, Joseph Daussoigne-Méhul, wrote new recitatives for the opera's revival in Paris at the Académie Royale de Musique.

== Roles ==
Role	Voice type	Premiere Cast, 3 May 1792 (Conductor: - )
Stratonice, a princess	soprano	Louise-Rosalie Lefebvre (known as Mme Dugazon)
Antiochus, Prince of Syria	haute-contre	Louis Michu
Séleucus, King of Syria	taille (baritenor)	Philippe Cauvy (known as "Philippe")
Erasistrate (Erasistratus), a doctor	baritone	Jean-Pierre Solié

== Synopsis ==
Méhul in 1799; portrait by Antoine Gros

Antiochus, the son of King Seleucus, is pining away yet he would rather die than name the cause of his disease to his father. The doctor, Erasistratus, suspects love is behind Antiochus's suffering. He notices that the prince's pulse rate increases when he sees Stratonice, a young woman intended as his father's bride, and further tests confirm his diagnosis. The doctor subtly reveals the truth to the king who is content to relinquish Stratonice to Antiochus to save his son's life and happiness.

=== Musical numbers ===
1. Overture
2. Chorus: Ciel! Ne soit point inexorable
3. Recitative and aria for Antiochus: Insensé, je forme des souhaits...Oui, c'en est fait!
4. Recitative and aria for Séleucus: Quelle funeste envie...Versez tous vos chagrins dans le sein paternel
5. Duet (Érasistrate, Antiochus): Parlez, parlez. Achevez de m'apprendre
6. Trio (Séleucus, Érasistrate, Antiochus): Je ne puis résister à mon impatience
7. Quartet (Stratonice, Séleucus, Érasistrate, Antiochus): Je tremble, mon cœur palpite
8. Recitative and aria for Érasistrate: Sur le sort de son fils...Ô des amants déité tutélaire
9. Finale (Séleucus, Antiochus, Stratonice, Érasistrate, chorus): Ô mon fils, quel moment pour moi

== The work ==
=== Libretto ===
Hoffman designated Stratonice as a comédie héroïque, meaning a drama with a happy ending (contemporary French critics generally avoided the term "tragicomedy" as this suggested a work mixing tragic and comic elements). The choice of a Classical subject was unusual for an opéra comique of the time and set the fashion for similar works, including Méhul's own Épicure and Bion. The story of Stratonice had appeared several times on the French stage in the 17th and 18th centuries. Hoffman was particularly influenced by Thomas Corneille's play Antiochus (1666). French opera composers had also treated the subject: it forms the plot of the second entrée in Rameau's Les fêtes de Polymnie (1745).

=== Music ===
Méhul's friend and rival composer Cherubini deeply admired Stratonice: "Of all the works by Méhul, this is the best from beginning to end...Stratonice lacks nothing; it is a work of genius, Méhul's masterpiece." Hoffman's choice of Classical subject was unusual for the Opéra-Comique and Méhul's music was similarly innovative, more influenced by the serious tradition of tragédie lyrique than the lighter opéra comiques of Grétry which had been fashionable up to that point. Méhul studied Gluck and Salieri for their approach to musical drama, as well as Haydn's orchestration and the melodies of Sacchini and Piccinni, Italian composers who had written tragic operas for the French stage in the 1770s and 1780s. But he blended these influences with his own individual style to produce an original work. Contemporary critics praised the more melodic style of Stratonice compared to Méhul's earlier operas, Euphrosine and Cora. The most striking part of the work is the ensemble Parlez, parlez, achevez de m'apprendre (Numbers 5, 6 and 7), which builds from a duet to a trio and finally to a quartet of the four main characters. According to the critic Elizabeth Bartlet, this quartet made a great impression on the artist Ingres, a music lover who owned a copy of the score, and later painted a work entitled Antiochus and Stratonice, depicting this very moment.

== Recordings ==
- Stratonice: Patricia Petibon (Stratonice), Yann Beuron (Antiochus), Étienne Lescroart (Séleucus), Karl Daymond (Erasistrate); Cappella Coloniensis, Corona Coloniensis, conducted by William Christie (Erato, 1996; Catalogue number 0630-12714-2)

== Sources ==
- Printed score: Stratonice. Comédie héroïque en un Acte et en Vers, Par Mr. Hoffman, Représentée pour la premiere fois par les Comediens Italiens Ordinaires du Roy, le Jeudi 3 May 1792. Mise en Musique par Mr. Méhul, Pars, Huguet, s.d. (accessible online at Internet Archive)
- Adélaïde de Place Étienne Nicolas Méhul (Bleu Nuit Éditeur, 2005)
- The Viking Opera Guide, ed. Amanda Holden (Viking, 1993)
- Stratonice: introduction to the edition by M. Elizabeth C. Bartlet (Pendragon Press, 1997)
