= Étienne Méhul =

French composer

- Méhul in 1799
- Born: 22 June 1763; Givet, France
- Died: 18 October 1817 (aged 54); Paris, France
- Works: List of operas

Étienne Nicolas Méhul (French: [etjɛn nikɔla meyl]; 22 June 1763 – 18 October 1817) was a French composer of the late classical and early romantic periods. He was known as "the most important opera composer in France during the Revolution". He was also the first composer to be called a "Romantic". He is known particularly for his operas, written in keeping with the reforms introduced by Gluck and Mozart.

== Life ==
Méhul was born at Givet in Ardennes to Jean-François Méhul, a wine merchant, and his wife Marie-Cécile (née Keuly). His first music lessons came from a blind local organist. When he showed promise, he was sent to study with a German musician and organist, Wilhelm Hanser, at the monastery of Lavaldieu, a few miles from Givet. Here Méhul developed his lifelong love of flowers.

In 1778 or 1779 he went to Paris and began to study with Jean-Frédéric Edelmann, a harpsichord player and friend of Méhul's idol Christoph Willibald Gluck. Méhul's first published composition was a book of piano pieces in 1783. He also arranged airs from popular operas and by the late 1780s he had begun to think about an operatic career for himself.

In 1787, the writer Valadier offered Méhul one of his libretti, Cora, which had been rejected by Gluck in 1785. The Académie royale de musique (the Paris Opéra) put Méhul's work, under the title Alonzo et Cora, into rehearsal in June 1789. However, the rehearsals were abandoned on 8 August, probably because the Opéra had been suffering severe financial difficulties throughout the 1780s, and the opera was not premiered until 1791. In the meantime, Méhul found an ideal collaborator in the librettist François-Benoît Hoffman, who provided the words to the first of Méhul's operas to be performed, Euphrosine. Its premiere in 1790 was an immense success and marked the composer out as a new talent. It was also the start of his long relationship with the Comédie Italienne theatre (soon to be renamed the Opéra-Comique).

In spite of the failure of Cora in 1791 and the banning of Adrien for political reasons the year after that, Méhul consolidated his reputation with works such as Stratonice and Mélidore et Phrosine. During the French Revolution, Méhul composed many patriotic songs and propaganda pieces, the most famous of which is the Chant du départ. Méhul was rewarded by becoming the first composer named to the newly founded Institut de France in 1795. He also held a post as one of the five inspectors of the Conservatoire de Paris. Méhul was on friendly terms with Napoleon and became one of the first Frenchmen to receive the Légion d'honneur.

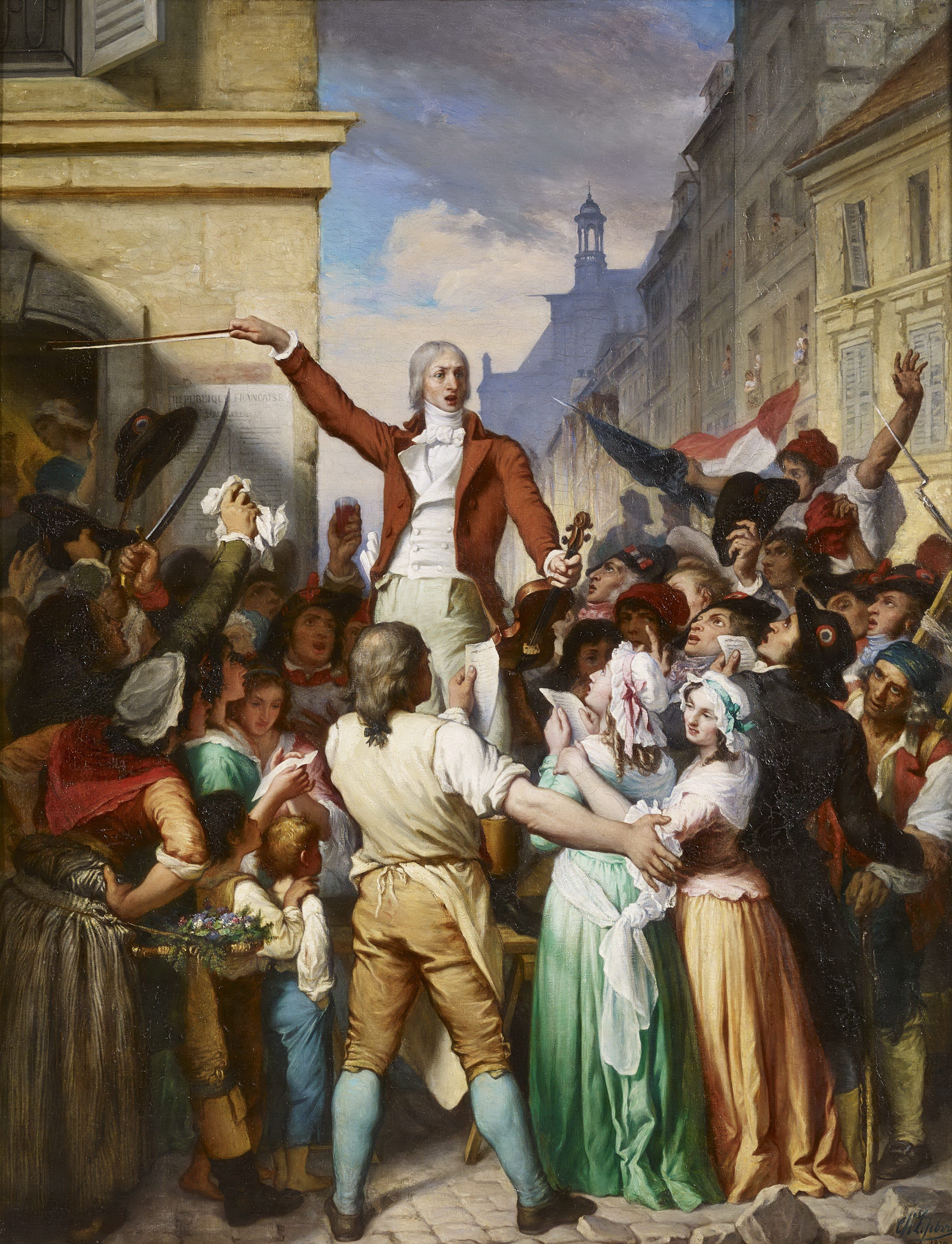
Méhul teaching his patriotic songs to the people of Paris

Méhul's operatic success was not as great in the first decade of the nineteenth century as it had been in the 1790s, although works such as Joseph (1807) became famous abroad, particularly in Germany. The failure of his opera Les amazones in 1811 was a severe blow and virtually ended his career as a composer for the theatre. Despite his friendship with Napoleon, Méhul's public standing survived the transition to the Bourbon Restoration intact. However, the composer was now seriously ill with tuberculosis and he died on 18 October 1817. His grave is at Père Lachaise Cemetery, near the grave of the composer François Joseph Gossec.

In 1797 Méhul adopted his seven-year-old nephew, composer Joseph Daussoigne-Méhul, and Joseph's younger brother. He played a major role in his nephew's musical education and career; counting him among his pupils at the Conservatoire de Paris. After his death, Daussoigne-Méhul completed Méhul's unfinished opera Valentine de Milan which premiered at the Opéra-Comique in 1822. He also wrote new recitatives for his opera Stratonice in 1821 for a revival of that work in Paris.

== Music ==
=== Operas ===
Méhul's most important contribution to music was his operas. He led the generation of composers who emerged in France in the 1790s, which included his friend and rival Luigi Cherubini and his outright enemy Jean-François Le Sueur. Méhul followed the example of the operas which Gluck had written for Paris in the 1770s and applied Gluck's "reforms" to opéra comique (a genre which mixed music with spoken dialogue and was not necessarily at all "comic" in mood). But he pushed music in a more Romantic direction, showing an increased use of dissonance and an interest in psychological states such as anger and jealousy, thus foreshadowing later Romantic composers such as Weber and Berlioz. Indeed, Méhul was the first composer to be styled a Romantic; a critic used the term in La chronique de Paris on 1 April 1793 when reviewing Méhul's Le jeune sage et le vieux fou.

Méhul's main musical concern was that everything should serve to increase the dramatic impact. As his admirer Berlioz wrote:

[Méhul] was fully convinced that in truly dramatic music, when the importance of the situation deserves the sacrifice, the composer should not hesitate as between a pretty musical effect that is foreign to the scenic or dramatic character, and a series of accents that are true but do not yield any surface pleasure. He was convinced that musical expressiveness is a lovely flower, delicate and rare, of exquisite fragrance, which does not bloom without culture, and which a breath can wither; that it does not dwell in melody alone, but that everything concurs either to create or destroy it – melody, harmony, modulation, rhythm, instrumentation, the choice of deep or high registers for the voices or instruments, a quick or slow tempo, and the several degrees of volume in the sound emitted.

One way in which Méhul increased dramatic expressivity was to experiment with orchestration. For example, in Uthal, an opera set in the Highlands of Scotland, he eliminated violins from the orchestra, replacing them with the darker sounds of violas in order to add local colour. Méhul's La chasse du jeune Henri (Young Henri's Hunt) provides a more humorous example, with its expanded horn section portraying yelping hounds as well as giving hunting calls. (Sir Thomas Beecham frequently programmed this piece to showcase the Royal Philharmonic horn section.)

Méhul's key works of the 1790s were Euphrosine, Stratonice, Mélidore et Phrosine and Ariodant. Ariodant, though a failure at its premiere in 1799, has come in for particular praise from critics. Elizabeth Bartlet calls it "Mehul's best work of the decade and a highpoint of Revolutionary opera". It deals with the same tale of passion and jealousy as Handel's 1735 opera Ariodante. As in many of his other operas, Mehul makes use of a structural device called the "reminiscence motif", a musical theme associated with a particular character or idea in the opera. This device looks forward to the leitmotifs in Richard Wagner's music dramas. In Ariodant, the reminiscence motif is the cri de fureur ("cry of fury"), expressing the emotion of jealousy.

Around 1800, the popularity of such stormy dramas began to wane, replaced by a fashion for the lighter opéra comiques of composers such as François-Adrien Boieldieu. In addition, Mehul's friend Napoleon told him he preferred a more comic style of opera. As a Corsican, Napoleon's cultural background was Italian, and he loved the opera buffa of composers like Paisiello and Cimarosa. Méhul responded with L'irato ("The Angry Man"), a one-act comedy premiered as the work of the Italian composer "Fiorelli" in 1801. When it became an immediate success, Méhul revealed the hoax he had played. Méhul also continued to compose works in a more serious vein. Joseph, based on the Biblical story of Joseph and his brothers, is the most famous of these later operas, but its success in France was short-lived. In Germany, however, it won many admirers throughout the nineteenth century, including Wagner. A melody from Joseph is very similar to a popular folk melody widely known in Germany which was used as a song in the Imperial German Navy, and adapted, notoriously, as the tune for the co-national anthem of Nazi Germany, the Horst-Wessel-Lied. It is unclear, however, whether Méhul's melody was the actual provenance of the melody.

=== Symphonies and other works ===
Besides operas, Méhul composed a number of songs for the festivals of the republic (often commissioned by the emperor Napoleon), cantatas, and five symphonies in the years 1797 and 1808 to 1810.

Mehul's First Symphony (1808) is notable for its dissonant and violent mood, and has been compared to Beethoven's Symphony No. 5, written in the same year. Taking inspiration from the more anguished works of Haydn and Mozart, such as Haydn's Sturm und Drang and later Paris Symphonies of 1785–86 and Mozart's Symphony No. 40 (K. 550, 1788), it was revived in one of Felix Mendelssohn's concerts with the Leipzig Gewandhaus Orchestra in 1838 and 1846 to an audience including Robert Schumann, who was impressed by the piece. (At the time of writing, only Beethoven's Symphonies Nos. 1 and 2 [1799/1800 and 1802] had been performed in France.) His other symphonies also followed German and Austrian models. Commenting after the premiere of his first symphony, he noted: "I understood all the dangers of my enterprise; I foresaw the cautious welcome that the music-lovers would give my symphonies. I plan to write new ones for next winter and shall try to write them… to accustom the public gradually to think that a Frenchman may follow Haydn and Mozart at a distance."

A fifth symphony was never completed—"as disillusionment and tuberculosis took their toll", in the words of David Charlton. The Symphonies Nos. 3 and 4 were only rediscovered by Charlton in 1979. Interviewed 8 November 2010 on the BBC Radio 4's Today programme, Professor Charlton said that Méhul's 4th Symphony was the first ever to employ the cyclical principle.

== List of works ==
=== For piano ===
- 3 Sonates for Piano, op. 1 (1783)
- 3 Sonates for Piano, op. 2 (1788)
- Fierement for Piano

=== Orchestral music ===
- Ouverture burlesque (1794)
- Ouverture pour instruments à vent (1794)
- Symphony in C (1797, only parts are surviving)
- Symphony No. 1 in G minor (1808/09)
- Symphony No. 2 in D major (1808/09)
- Symphony No. 3 in C major (1809)
- Symphony No. 4 in E major (1810)
- Symphony No. 5 (1810, only the first movement survives; incomplete and unperformed)

=== Vocal music ===
- Chant du départ (1794)
- Chant des victoires (1794)
- Messe Solennelle pour soli, chœurs et orgue (1804)
- Chant du retour pour la Grande Armée (1808)
- Chant lyrique pour l'inauguration de la statue de Napoléon (1811)

=== Ballets ===
- Le jugement de Pâris (1793)
- La dansomanie (1800)
- Persée et Andromède (1810) (together with music by Haydn, Paer, and Steibelt)

=== Incidental music for plays ===
- Timoléon (by Marie-Joseph Chénier)
- Les Hussites (by Alexandre Duval)

== Discography ==
- Uthal. Karine Deshayes, Yann Beuron, Jean-Sébastien Bou, Christophe Rousset (conductor), Les Talens Lyriques, Chœur de chambre de Namur. Bru Zane, 2017.
- Adrien. Gabrielle Philiponet, Philippe Do, Marc Barrard, Philippe Talbot, Nicolas Courjal, Jean Teigen, Jennifer Borghi, György Vashegyi (dir.), Orfeo Orchestra, Purcell Choir. Bru Zane, 2014.
- Joseph. Natalie Dessay, soprano; Brigitte Lafon, mezzo-soprano; Laurence Dale, Antoine Normand, Philippe Pistole, tenors; René Massis, baritone; Frédéric Vassar, Philippe Jorquera, basses; Abbi Patrix, speaker; Ensemble choral "Intermezzo"; Orchestre régional de Picardie "Le Sinfonietta"; Claude Bardon, conductor. Chant du monde, c. 1989.
- Piano Sonatas opp. 1 (Nos. 1–3) & 2 (Nos. 4–6). Brigitte Haudebourg, piano. Arcobaleno, c. 1990.
- Chant national du 14 juillet 1800; Hymne à la raison; Le chant du départ. Chœur et Orchestre du Capitole de Toulouse; Michel Plasson, conductor. EMI, 1990.
- The Complete Symphonies (Symphonies Nos. 1–4; including the Ouvertures La Chasse du jeune Henri and Le Trésor supposé). Lisbon Gulbenkian Foundation Orchestra, Michel Swierczewski. Nimbus Records, 1992.
- La Chasse du jeune Henri, Le Trésor supposé and Timoléon. Royal Philharmonic Orchestra, Sir Thomas Beecham. Sony, 2002.
- Stratonice. Petibon, Beuron, Lescoart, Daymond, Corona Coloniensis, Cappella Coloniensis, William Christie, Erato 1996.
- Symphonies Nos 1 and 2. Les Musiciens du Louvre, Marc Minkowski, Erato/Apex, 2003.
- Overtures: Mélidore et Phrosine; Ariodant; Joseph; Horatius Coclès; Bion; Le jeune sage et le vieux fou; Le trésor supposé; Les deux aveugles de Tolède; La chasse du jeune Henri. Orchestre de Bretagne, Stefan Sanderling, ASV, 2003.
- Joseph (as Joseph in Ägypten), two versions of the work in German both recorded in 1955: (a) Alexander Welitsch, Libero di Luca, Horst Guenter, Ursula Zollenkopf, NDR Chor and orchestra of the NWDR, Wilhelm Schüchter; (b) Alexander Welitsch, Josef Traxel, Bernhard Michaelis, Friederike Sailer, Stuttgart Radio Symphony Orchestra, Südfunk-Chor, Alfons Rischner. Gala, 2004.
- L'Irato. Turk, Auvity, Courtin, Buet, Chamber Choir Bonn, L'arte del mondo, Walter Ehrhardt. Capriccio, 2006.
- Le chant du départ; Chant Funèbre à la Mémoire de Féraud; Hymne pour la Fête des Epoux; Ouverture. Edwige Perfetti, soprano; Tibère Raffali, Christian Papis, tenors; Gilles Cachemaille, baritone; Orchestre d'Harmonie des Gardiens de la Paix de Paris; Claude Pichaureau, conductor; Chœur de l'Armée Française; Serge Zapolski, chorus-master; Chorale a Chœur Joie la Gondoire; Daniel Catenne, chorus-master; Chorale Populaire de Paris; Jean-Claude Chambard, chorus-master. Musifrance, n.d.

== Sources ==
- Alexandre Dratwicki & Etienne Jardin, Le Fer et les Fleurs : Etienne-Nicolas Méhul (1763–1817) (Actes Sud & Palazzetto Bru Zane, 2017)
- Adélaïde de Place Étienne Nicolas Méhul (Bleu Nuit Éditeur, 2005)
- Berlioz Evenings with the Orchestra, translated by Jacques Barzun (University of Chicago Press, 1953)
- Booklet notes by David Charlton to the recording "The Complete Symphonies" (Nimbus, 1989)
- Booklet notes by Ates Orga to the recording of Méhul's "Overtures" (ASV, 2002).
- David Cairns Berlioz: the Making of an Artist (André Deutsch, 1989).
- David Charlton, section on Méhul in The Viking Opera Guide ed.Holden (1993)
- David Charlton, chapter on "French Opera 1800–1850" in The Oxford Illustrated History of Opera ed. Roger Parker (OUP, 1994)
- Introduction to the edition of Méhul's opera Stratonice by M.Elizabeth C. Bartlet (Pendragon Press, 1997)
