= Baritenor =

Tenor with a lower mid-range

Baritenor (also rendered in English-language sources as bari-tenor or baritenore) is a portmanteau (blend) of the words "baritone" and "tenor". It is used to describe both baritone and tenor voices. In Webster's Third New International Dictionary it is defined as "a baritone singing voice with virtually a tenor range". However, the term was defined in several late 19th century and early 20th century music dictionaries, such as The American History and Encyclopedia of Music, as "a low tenor voice, almost baritone [sic]."

== In opera ==
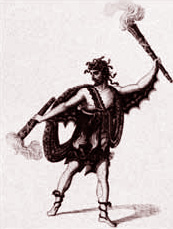
Baritenor Andrea Nozzari as Poliflegante in Mayr's Il sogno di Partenope

Baritenor (or its Italian form, baritenore) is still used today to describe a type of tenor voice which came to particular prominence in Rossini's operas. It is characterized by a dark, weighty lower octave and a ringing upper one but with sufficient agility for coloratura singing. Rossini used this type of voice to portray noble (and usually older), leading characters, often in contrast to the higher, lighter voices of the tenore di grazia or the tenore contraltino who portrayed the young, impetuous lovers. An example of this contrast can be found in his Otello (1816), where the role of Otello was written for a baritenore (Andrea Nozzari), while the role of Rodrigo, his young rival for the affections of Desdemona, was written for a tenore di grazia (Giovanni David). Nozzari and David were paired again in Rossini's Ricciardo e Zoraide (1818), with a similar contrast in characters – Nozzari sang the role of Agorante, King of Nubia, while David portrayed the Christian knight, Ricciardo. Other notable baritenors of this period beside Nozzari were Gaetano Crivelli, Nicola Tacchinardi, Manuel García Sr. and Domenico Donzelli.

Italian musicologist Rodolfo Celletti proposed that the Rossinian baritenor was nothing new to opera. According to Celletti, the tenor voices used for leading roles in early baroque operas such as Jacopo Peri's Euridice (1600) and Claudio Monteverdi's Il ritorno d'Ulisse in patria (1640) were essentially "baritenor" ones with a range common to both the baritone and tenor voices of today. Much the same position was also adopted in 2000 by Fabrizio Dorsi in his history of Italian opera. In his 2009 book, Tenor: History of a voice, John Potter refers to this type of voice as "tenor-bass" and notes that several virtuoso singers of the 17th century who were described as "tenors" by their contemporaries could also sing in the bass register: Giulio Caccini, Giuseppino Cenci, Giovanni Domenico Puliaschi and Francesco Rasi. Rasi created the title role in Monteverdi's first opera, L'Orfeo (1607), which in modern times has been sung by tenors such as Anthony Rolfe Johnson as well as by lyric baritones, such as Simon Keenlyside. Based on their descriptions in Vincenzo Giustiniani's Discorso sopra la musica (1628), Potter has suggested that singers such as Caccini, Cenci, Puliaschi, and Rasi, employed an "open speech-like sound" which facilitated the agility and clarity of expression for which their voices were renowned.

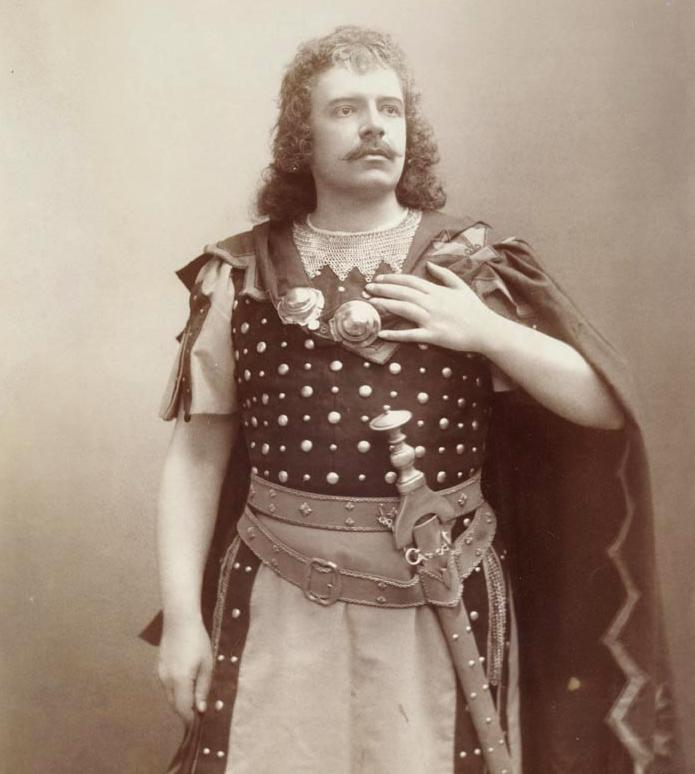
Tenor Jean de Reszke who originally trained as a baritone

With the rise of the castrato singer in Italian opera, the baritenor voice came to be perceived as "ordinary" or even "vulgar" and was relegated to portraying character roles – villains, grotesques, old men, and even women. Although there were exceptions, such as Dario in Vivaldi's L'incoronazione di Dario (created by the tenor Annibale Pio Fabri), the leading male roles (and especially that of the romantic lover) in Italian operas of the middle and late baroque era were largely written for the high, exotic voices of the castrati. In French opera of the same period, the baritenor voice, called the taille (or haute-taille) before the term ténor came into general use, was little used for important solo parts, although possibly more often than in Italian opera. Because of the general dislike for the castrato voice in France, young lover roles were assigned to the high male voices of hautes-contre. Today the taille roles are most often performed by baritones.

== In vocal pedagogy ==
Vocal pedagogues such as Richard Miller use the term to refer to a common voice category in young male singers whose tessitura (most comfortable vocal range) lies between that of a baritone and that of a tenor and whose passage zone lies between C_{4} and F_{4}. Such singers can evolve, either naturally or through training, into high baritones, suitable for operatic roles such as Pelléas in Pelléas et Mélisande. Alternatively, they may evolve into spieltenors, suitable for character roles such as Pedrillo in The Abduction from the Seraglio or into heldentenors who sing leading roles such as Siegmund in Die Walküre or Florestan in Fidelio. In both these types of tenor roles the highest notes of the tenor range are rarely required, and the voice usually has a baritonal weight in the lower notes. Several famous tenors who have sung the dramatic tenor and heldentenor repertory originally began their careers as baritones, including Jean de Reszke, Giovanni Zenatello, Renato Zanelli, Lauritz Melchior, Erik Schmedes, and Plácido Domingo. Towards the end of his career, Domingo returned to the baritone repertoire when he sang the title role in Simon Boccanegra. Self-described as "a bastard bari-tenor", Walter Slezak (the son of operatic tenor Leo Slezak) was primarily a stage and film actor, but he also sang tenor roles in musicals and operettas, and appeared at the Metropolitan Opera in 1959 as Zsupán in The Gypsy Baron. In popular music, singer Josh Groban is generally recognized as a baritenor, and he describes himself as "a baritone with some high notes up [his] sleeve".

== In musical theatre ==
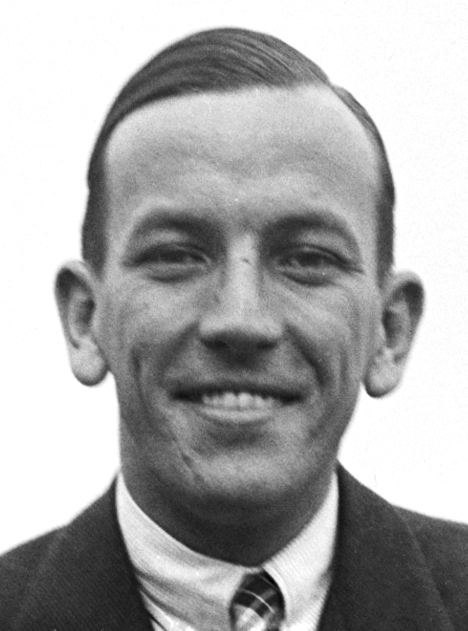
Noël Coward, whose singing voice has been described as "a distinctive baritenor"

Despite being described in Acting the Song: Performance Skills for the Musical Theatre as a term "coined" by "musical theatre vernacular", the use of baritenor in relation to the operatic voice can be seen in English sources since at least 1835, and French ones since 1829. Nevertheless, the term is widely used in musical theatre to describe a baritone voice capable of singing notes in the tenor range, and was used as early as 1950 to describe the voice of Eddie Fisher in a variety show at New York's Paramount Theatre. Deer and Dal Vera have noted that by 2008, the majority of leading roles in rock musicals were being written for baritenors. Amongst the roles specifying baritenor voices in casting calls between 2008 and 2010 were: Tom Collins (Rent), Bob and Tommy (Jersey Boys); Wizard, Cowardly Lion, Scarecrow, and Tinman (The Wiz); Max Bialystock and Leopold Bloom (The Producers); and Thomas Weaver and Alvin Kelby (The Story of My Life).

Saltzman and Dési ascribe the rise of the baritenor voice in musical theatre to the introduction of amplification in the second half of the 20th century. Prior to that, the leading roles were predominantly sung by tenors and sopranos with even the baritone characters tending to sing in the upper part of their range. This was due not only to the popular taste of the times, but also to the fact that higher voices were more capable of riding over the orchestra and reaching the furthest seats. The introduction of amplification allowed male leading roles to be assigned to baritones, albeit ones who often had an extension into the tenor range. David Young also notes that the baritenor voice can be particularly useful for roles such as Marius in Fanny where the character ages significantly during the course of the musical.
