= Madame Gonthier =

French actress and lyrical artist (1747–1829)

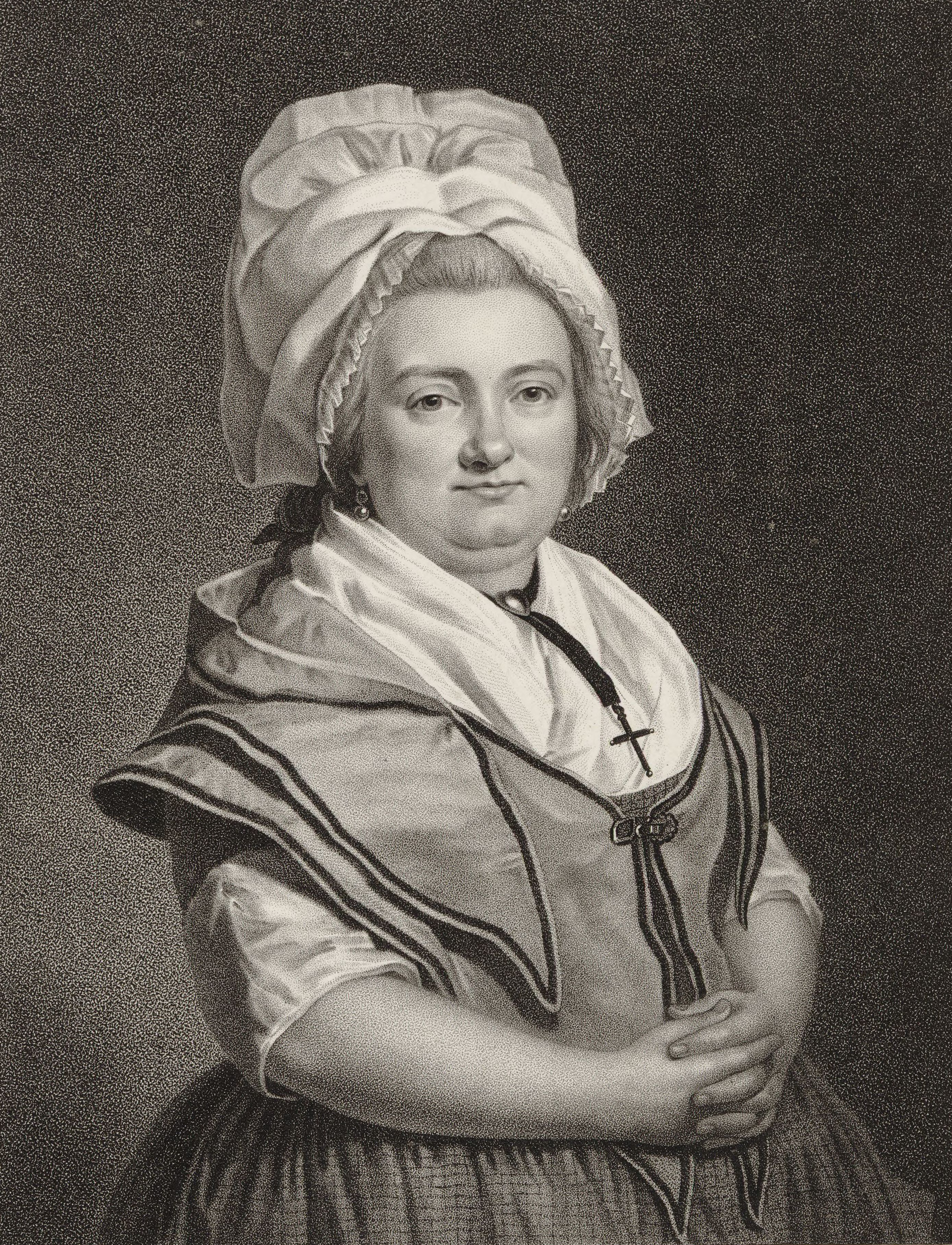
Mme Gonthier, role of Perrette in Fanfan et Colas (1822)

Rose Françoise Carpentier called Madame Gonthier (4 March 1747 – 7 December 1829), was a French actress and lyrical artist.

== Life ==
Born in Metz in 1747, her aptitude for theatrical arts is said to have been apparent from childhood, and a few society successes proved her aptitude for comic roles. She played in the provinces and in Brussels from 1771 to 1777, where she was a member of theatre La Monnaie's company, which was sponsored by Prince Charles Alexander of Lorraine, governor of the Austrian Netherlands

In 1778 she made her debut in Paris, at the Comédie-Italienne (into which the Opéra-Comique had been merged) being engaged for the roles of duègnes (duennas) : on 18, 19 and 21 Mars she performed the role of Simone in Le sorcier by Philidor, then the mother Bobi, in Rose et Colas by Monsigny, and finally Alix, in the premiere of Les trois fermiers by Dezède.

Thanks to her success, on 2 May of the same year, with an act signed by the Duke of Richelieu and the Duke of Duras on behalf of the Maison du Roi, she was officially received "into the Comédie Italienne to play duenna roles with the promise to be received with a quarter share at Easter 1779, whereupon she is pledged to faithfully fill all such roles and those for which the Comédie will deem her necessary".

Thus, in 1779, she was admitted as a member of the Comédie-Italienne. She successively played comedy and comic opera. In 1783 her appearance at the first Salle Favart, the new venue of the theatre, was marked by triumphs. In the theatre registers between 1780 and 1784, the following note about her is reported:

— Gontier: naturalness, sensitiveness, cheerfulness constitute her talent; she has little voice.

She later left the Opéra-Comique (as the Comedie Italienne had been renamed) following a dispute with the management and in 1793 she signed a contract with the théâtre de la République but Madame Gonthier was not there "in her sphere". She played in Lille in 1798–1799.

In 1801, she was a member of the new society of actors of the Théâtre national de l'Opéra-Comique.

Among the many creations that mark her career, Alix from Blaise et Babet by Dezède (1783), Perrette in Fanfan et Colas (1784), Babet in Philippe et Georgette (1791), the old peasant in Adèle et Dorsan (1795), Madame Bernard in Marianne, Mopsa from The judgment of Midas.

In 1807, a performance for her benefit was given at the Paris Opera in the presence of the empress Joséphine de Beauharnais.

She said goodbye to the Opéra-Comique in 1812.

== Private ==
She married Charles-Adrien Gontier, an actor in Brussels then in Versailles, and in second marriage François Allaire (†1828), coryphée of the Opéra-Comique, in 1798.

According to Sainte-Beuve, she is said to have had a romantic relationship with Florian in 1778, and inspired the character of Estelle in Estelle et Némorin by Henri-Joseph Rigel (1788).

== Creation ==
- 1783 : Blaise et Babet by Nicolas Dezède, role of Alix
- 1784 : Fanfan et Colas ou les frères de lait, one-act comedy by Madame de Beaunoir, création à la Comédie-Italienne, 7 September
- 1789 : Le Tuteur célibataire, comedy in one act by M. Desforges, first performed at the Comédie-Italienne on 17 November
- 1790 : Pierre le Grand, opéra-comique by André Grétry, libretto by Jean-Nicolas Bouilly, 13 January, part of Geneviève
- 1790: Le Chêne patriotique ou la matinée du 14 juillet, two acts libretto by Daleyrac, libretto by Boutet de Monvel, music creation at Comédie-Italienne, 10 July, role of Madame Alerte
- 1791: Philippe et Georgette, libretto by Jacques-Marie Boutet de Monvel, music by Nicolas Dalayrac premiere at the Comédie-Italienne, 28 December part of Babet.
- 1795: Adèle et Dorsan by Nicolas Dalayrac part of the old peasant.
- 1796: Le Mariage de la veille, one-act comedy, libretto by Charles-Joseph Loeillard d'Avrigny; music by Louis Emmanuel Jadin, creation at the Opéra-Comique 2 January
- 1797: Le jeune Henri, opéra by Mehul, created at Théâtre Favart, 1 May, part of Christine
- 1797: Ponce de Léon, Opéra bouffe in 3 acts by Henri-Montan Berton, creation 15 March at the Opéra-Comique, part of Miss Dalmanchinaros.
- 1798 : Primerose, 3-act opera; libretto by Favières and Morel de Vendée; music by Daleyrac, creation at the Opéra-Comique 7 March.
- 1799: Le Général suédois, opéra-comique, 23 May.
- 1800: Vadé chez lui, comedy in one act by Jacques Benoît Demautort, created at the Opéra-Comique, 4 August
- 1801: Le Grand deuil, opéra-bouffe in 1 act by Henri-Montan Berton, libretto by Jean-Baptiste-Charles Vial and Charles-Guillaume Étienne, creation at the Opéra-Comique, 15 January, part of Mme Leblanc.
- 1801: L'impromptu de Campagne, 1-act opéra-comique, libretto by Étienne-Joseph-Bernard Delrieu, music by Nicolas Isouard 1st performance at the Opéra-Comique, 30 June
- 1802: Lysistrata, comedy in one act, mixed with vaudeville, libretto by François-Benoît Hoffman, creation at the Opéra-Comique, 16 January
- 1802: L'Antichambre, ou les Valets chez eux, opéra comique, in one act, libretto by Emmanuel Dupaty, music by Nicolas Dalayrac, created at the Opéra-Comique, 27 February. modified under a different title : Picaros et Diégo, ou la Folle soirée (3 May 1803).
- 1803: Ma tante Aurore, ou le Roman impromptu, opera buffa in two acts, libretto by Longchamps and music by Boieldieu, creation at the Opéra-Comique, 13 January, part of Aurore de Germond.
- 1803: Picaros et Diégo, opera buffa en un acte, libretto by Emmanuel Dupaty, music by Nicolas Dalayrac, représenté pour la première fois, à l'Opéra Comique, 3 May, rôle de Dona Barba.
- 1804: La jeune prude ou les femmes entre elles, comedy and song in one act, libretto by Emmanuel Dupaty, music by Nicolas Dalayrac, premiered at the Opéra-Comique 14 January.
- 1804: La Romance, 1 act opera by Henri-Montan Berton, libretto by Gaugiran-Nanteuil and Claude-François Fillette-Loraux, created at the Opéra-Comique, 26 January, part of Catherine.
- 1804: Un quart-d'heure de silence, one-act opera, libretto by P. Guillet, music by Pierre Gaveaux, created at theOpéra-Comique, 9 June.
- 1806: Les Maris garçons, one-act opera; libretto by Gaugiran-Nanteuil, music by Henri-Montan Berton, created at the Opéra-Comique, 14 July, part of Mme Dugrand<.
- 1808 : Anna, ou les Deux Chaumieres, one-act opera, libretto Sewrin, music by Solié; creation at the Opéra-Comique 20 February.
- 24 February 1809: Avis aux Jaloux, ou la Rencontre Imprévue, opéra-comique in one act, libretto by René de Chazet and Jean-Baptiste Dubois, music by Louis Alexandre Piccinni, creation at the Opéra-Comique (Salle Feydeau) 25 Octobre, part of Marceline

== Notes and references ==
=== References ===
- Campardon, Émile (1970) [1880]. Les Comédiens du roi de la troupe italienne pendant les deux derniers siècles: Documents inédits recueillis aux Archives Nationales (in French). Vol. I. Genève: Slatkine Reprints. Gontier.
- Fétis, François-Joseph (1837–1844). Biographie universelle des musiciens et bibliographie générale de la musique. Tome 4. Brussel. p. 371.
- Le Bas, Philippe (1840–1845). L'Univers. France : dictionnaire encyclopédique, T. 9. Paris. p. 13..
- Escudier, Marie; Escudier, Léon (1856). Vie et aventures des cantatrices célèbres. Paris. pp. 115–118..
- Lyonnet, Henry. Dictionnaire des comédiens français, ceux d'hier, T. 2. E-Z (in French). Geneva. p. 146..
- "L'Estelle de Florian, Madame Gonthier". Revue des deux mondes (in French). 26: 907–929. 15 April 1925..
- Pilon, Edmond (1925). Amours mortes. Belles Amours. Un poète de Marie Stuart: M. de Maisonfleur. Maucroix et la marquise de Brosses. Au pays de Louise de La Vallière. L'"Estelle" de Florian : Madame Gonthier. Une figure d'Alsace : la baronne d'Oberkirch. Ondine Valmore (in French). Impr.-libr.-éditeurs Plon-Nourrit et Cie, 8, rue Garancière (VIe)..
