= Charles-Frédéric Kreubé =

French violinist, conductor and composer (1777–1846)

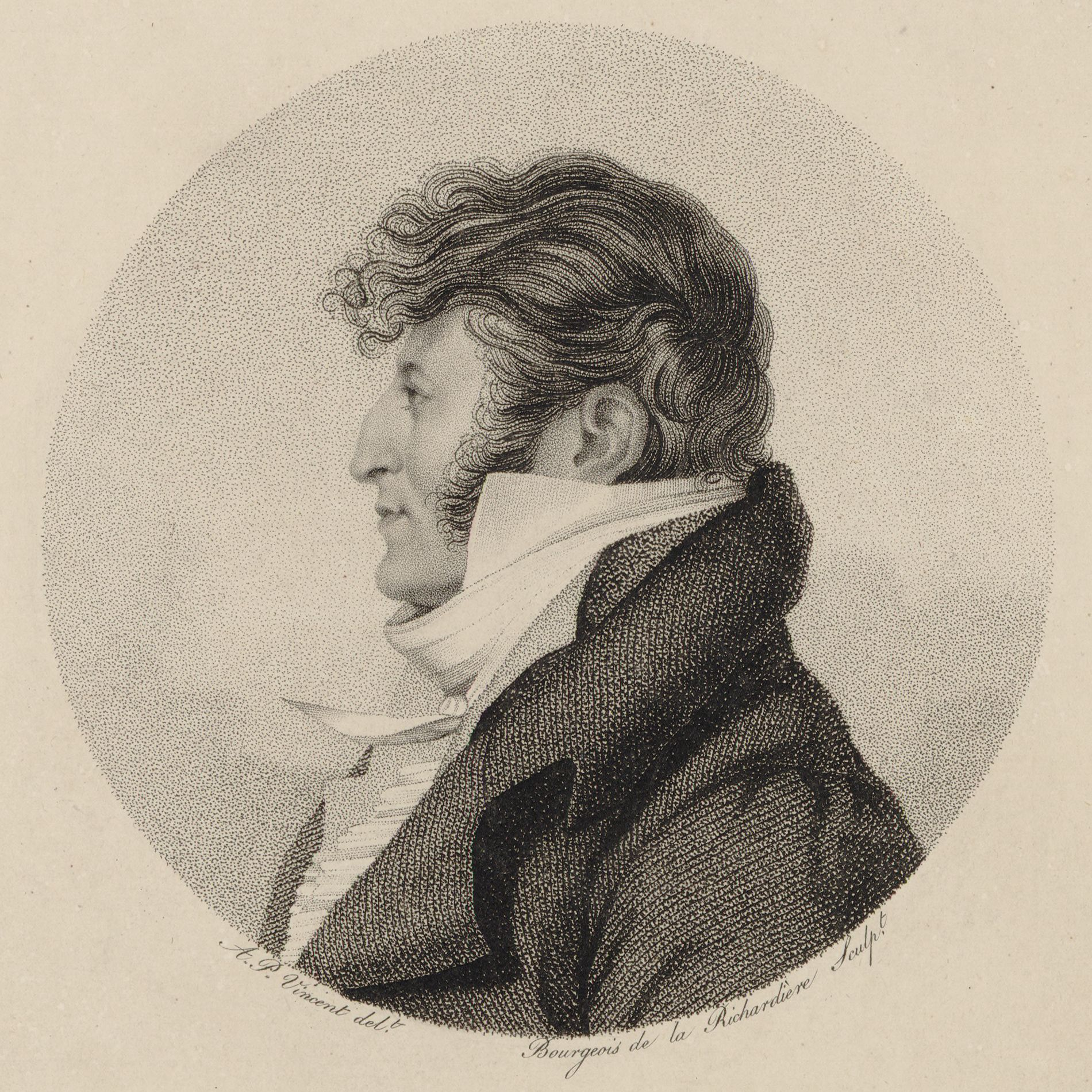
Charles-Frédéric Kreubé

Charles-Frédéric Kreubé (Lunéville, 5 November 1777 – Saint-Denis, 3 May 1846) was a 19th-century French violinist, conductor and composer.

== Biography ==
A student of Rodolphe Kreutzer, he was admitted in 1801 into the orchestra of the Opéra-Comique, originally as first violin, became deputy conductor in 1805 and succeeded Frédéric Blasius as first chief in 1816, a position that he would leave in 1828.

He authored music for opéras comiques, arrangements for operas and compositions of numerous plays for Parisian boulevard theatres of the 19th century.

== Works ==
- 1803: Aline, reine de Golconde, opera in three acts, by Jean-Baptiste Vial and Edmond Favières, (arrangements)
- 1805: Le Vaisseau amiral opera in one act, by Saint-Cyr, (arrangements)
- 1809: Françoise de Foix, in three acts by Jean-Nicolas Bouilly and Emmanuel Dupaty, (operture)
- 1813: Le Forgeron de Bassora, opéra comique in two acts by Charles Augustin de Bassompierre
- 1814: Le Portrait de famille ou Les Héritiers punis, opéra comique by Eugène de Planard
- 1814: La Redingotte et la perruque, opéra comique by Eugène Scribe
- 1816: Une nuit d'intrigue ou Le Retour du bal masqué, opéra comique by Jean Michel Constant Leber
- 1816: La Jeune Belle-mère, opéra comique by Charles Augustin de Bassompierre and Théophile Marion Dumersan
- 1817: L'Héritière, opéra comique by Emmanuel Théaulon
- 1819: Edmond et Caroline ou La Lettre et la Réponse, comedy in one act by Benoît-Joseph Marsollier des Vivetières, (morceaux détachés voice and piano (or harp)
- 1820: La Jeune Tante, opéra comique by Anne Honoré Joseph Duveyrier de Mélesville
- 1821: Le Philosophe en voyage, opera in three acts by Louis-Barthélémy Pradher and Paul de Kock
- 1822: Le Coq de village, opéra comique by Achille d'Artois
- 1822: Le Paradis de Mahomet ou La Pluralité des femmes, opéra comique by Scribe and Mélesville
- 1823: Jenny la Bouquetière, opéra comique by Jean-Nicolas Bouilly, Joseph Marie Pain and Pradher
- 1824: L'officier et le paysan, opéra comique by Achille d'Artois
- 1825: Les Enfans de Maître Pierre, opéra comique in 3 acts, by Paul de Kock, (morceaux détachés voice and piano)
- 1827: La Lettre posthume, opéra comique by Scribe and Mélesville, after Walter Scott
- 1828: Le Mariage à l'anglaise, opéra comique in one act by Jean-Baptiste-Charles Vial and Justin Gensoul
- Deuxième Fantaisie pour piano et violon, with Victor Dourlen
- 3 Duos concertants pour deux violons
- 3 Quatuors pour deux violons, alto et basse
- Septième Recueil de romances, lyrics by Rairio
- Huitième Recueil de romances, lyrics by Hoffman
- Six Romances
- Trio concertant pour deux violons et basse

== Bibliography ==
- Charles Gabet, Dictionnaire des artistes de l'école française au XIX, 1831, p. 379
- Félix Crozet, Revue de la musique dramatique en France, 1866, p. 420
- Pierre Larousse, Nouveau Larousse illustré : dictionnaire universel, 1898, p. 503
- Hugo Riemann, Dictionnaire de musique, 1900, p. 427
- Manuel Gómez García, Diccionario Akal de Teatro, 1998, p. 451
