= Nina (opera) =

18th-century opera by Giovanni Paisiello

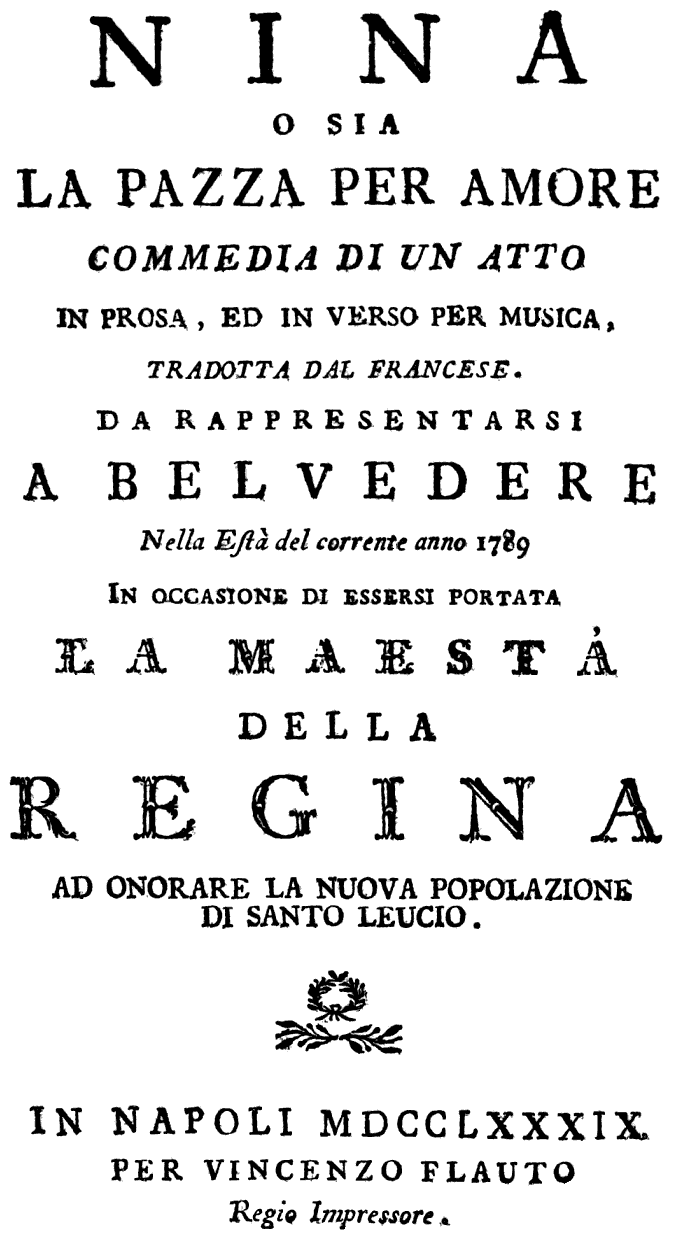
Title page of the libretto, 1789

Nina, o sia La pazza per amore (Nina, or Madly in Love) is an opera, described in 1790 as a commedia in prosa ed in verso per musica, in two acts by Giovanni Paisiello to an Italian libretto by Giovanni Battista Lorenzi after Giuseppe Carpani's translation of Benoît-Joseph Marsollier's Nina, ou La folle par amour, set by Nicolas Dalayrac in 1786. The work is a sentimental comedy with set numbers, recitative and spoken dialog. It is set in Italy in the 18th century. Nina was first performed in a one-act version at the Teatro del Reale Sito di Belvedere in Caserta, San Leucio on 25 June 1789. The revised and familiar two-act work was presented at the Teatro dei Fiorentini in Naples in the autumn of 1790.

== Roles ==
- Nina (soprano)
- Lindoro, her lover/Un Pastore (tenor)
- The Count, her father (bass)
- Susanna, her companion (mezzo-soprano)
- Giorgio, the Count's valet (bass)
- A musician (tenor)
- Second musician
- Chorus (staff and patients at the sanatorium)

== Synopsis ==
Act I

As the opera opens, Nina, the Count's daughter, has gone mad due to a broken heart. We learn that she was to marry Lindoro, with her father's approval, but on their wedding day a richer and more powerful suitor turned up, and the Count broke his word. Lindoro challenged his rival to a duel, and was killed. Now she wanders around the village doing good deeds for the people, who all adore her. The Count is tortured by remorse.

Nina goes to the crossroads at the same hour every day to wait for her lover. The villagers come to comfort her, and sing her favourite song. Nina sings in anticipation of meeting Lindoro, but when he fails to appear, Nina leaves flowers at the waiting place and returns to the village.

Act II

The Count's valet appears with good news: it turns out Lindoro is still alive. Giorgio tells his master that Lindoro is at the castle gates hoping to see his darling. The Count greets Lindoro with tears of joy. Lindoro tells him that he was seriously wounded and nursed back to health by a friend. He has stayed away until now, believing Nina married his rival. He is aghast to hear that his beloved has lost her mind.

The lovers are reunited, and Nina is restored to sanity.

== Discography ==
- Arts Music, Hans Ludwig Hirsch, 1998
- Ricordi, Riccardo Muti, 2000
- Nuova Era, Richard Bonynge, 2003
- (DVD) at IMDb, Ádám Fischer, 2002 (Zürich Opera)
- Archipel, Ennio Gerelli, 2007

== In popular culture ==
The fifth episode in the fourth season of Stranger Things is called "The Nina Project". Martin Brenner summarizes the plot of Nicolas Dalayrac's Nina to help Eleven understand her inability to use her telekinesis. As he speaks, Cecilia Bartoli's recording of Paisiello's "Il mio ben quando verrà" (When my beloved comes) is heard on the soundtrack. Brenner moralizes for El by referring to Nina's plight, "Leave your train station. Stop waiting. Focus. Listen. Remember."
