= Rose Renaud =

French opera singer (1767 – c. 1840)

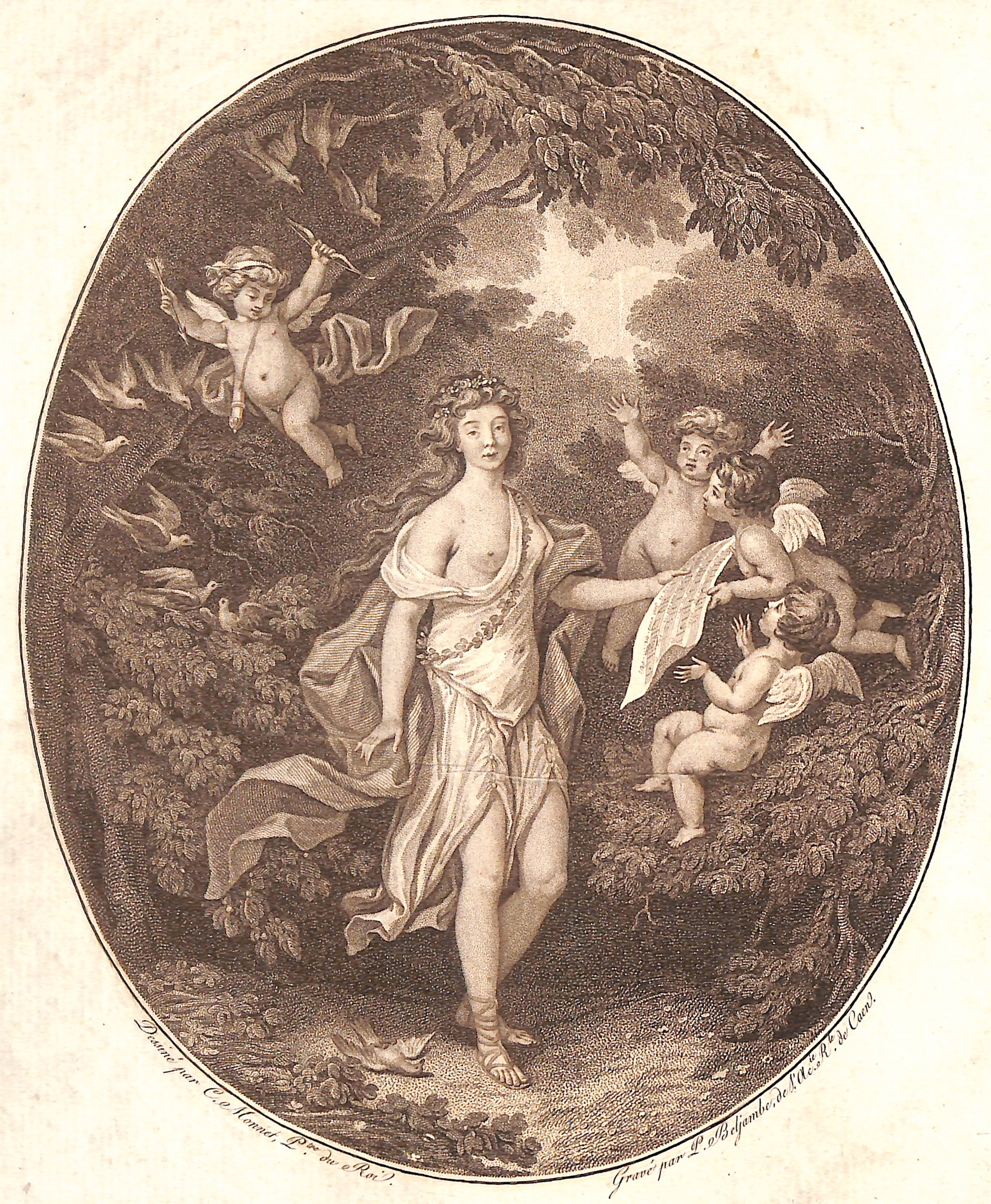
- Portrait of Renaud by Charles Monnet c. 1792
- Born: 1767; Paris, France
- Died: c. 1840
- Other names: Mademoiselle Renaud l'aînée
- Occupation: Opera singer (soprano)

Rose Renaud (1767 – c. 1840) was a French coloratura soprano active at the Théâtre-Italien from 1785 to 1793. She was known for the purity and agility of her voice and her attractive stage presence. Renaud was born in Paris and made her debut in a concert there in 1781 at the age of 14. She retired from the stage in 1793. Her younger sister, Sophie Renaud, was also a soprano at the Théâtre-Italien. In at least two sources (Fétis and Kutsch and Riemens), Rose is referred to as "Mademoiselle Renaud l'aînée" (Mademoiselle Renaud the elder) to distinguish her from Sophie. However, other sources (notably Pougin and Campardon) have posited that Rose and Sophie were in fact the younger sisters of a third singer known as "Mademoiselle Renaud l'aînée" who also sang at the Théâtre-Italien suggesting that aspects of Rose Renaud's biography and iconography and that of her elder sister may have been conflated in some of the existing sources.

== Life and career ==
Rose Renaud's entries in both Fétis and Kutsch and Riemens state that she was born in Paris and was trained as a singer by the composer and voice teacher Louis-Augustin Richer. She made her debut in 1781 while still a student singing arias by Antonio Sacchini, Gian Francesco de Majo and Henri-Montan Berton in a performance at the Concerts Spirituels. Her stage debut in May 1785 as Lucette in André Grétry's La fausse magie at the Théâtre-Italien caused a sensation. She went on to a series of successes at the theatre, becoming its première chanteuse à roulades. (Note: Première chanteuse à roulades was an 18th-century term for a French opera company's principal coloratura singer.) Amongst the roles she created during her time there were Célimène in Dalayrac's L'amant statue (1785) and Marie in Grétry's Guillaume Tell (1791). Thomas Jefferson saw "Mademoiselle Renaud" in Piccinni's opera Pénélope in Paris in 1785 and wrote to Abigail Adams that she "sings as no body ever sung before. She is far beyond Madame Mara." (Note: "Madame Mara" is a reference to the celebrated soprano Elisabeth Mara, an acquaintance of Maria Cosway with whom Jefferson had a close romantic relationship in the 1780s.)

According to Fétis, Renaud married the poet and librettist Charles-Joseph Loeillard d'Avrigny in 1792 and retired from the stage the following year. Rose's younger sister Sophie likewise became a favourite with the Théâtre-Italien's audiences. Both Rose and Sophie sang there in the 1790 premiere of Méhul's opera, Euphrosine—Rose as Léonore and Sophie as Louise. Sophie continued to sing at the theatre until 1793 when she also retired from the stage.

== "Mademoiselle Renaud l'aînée" ==
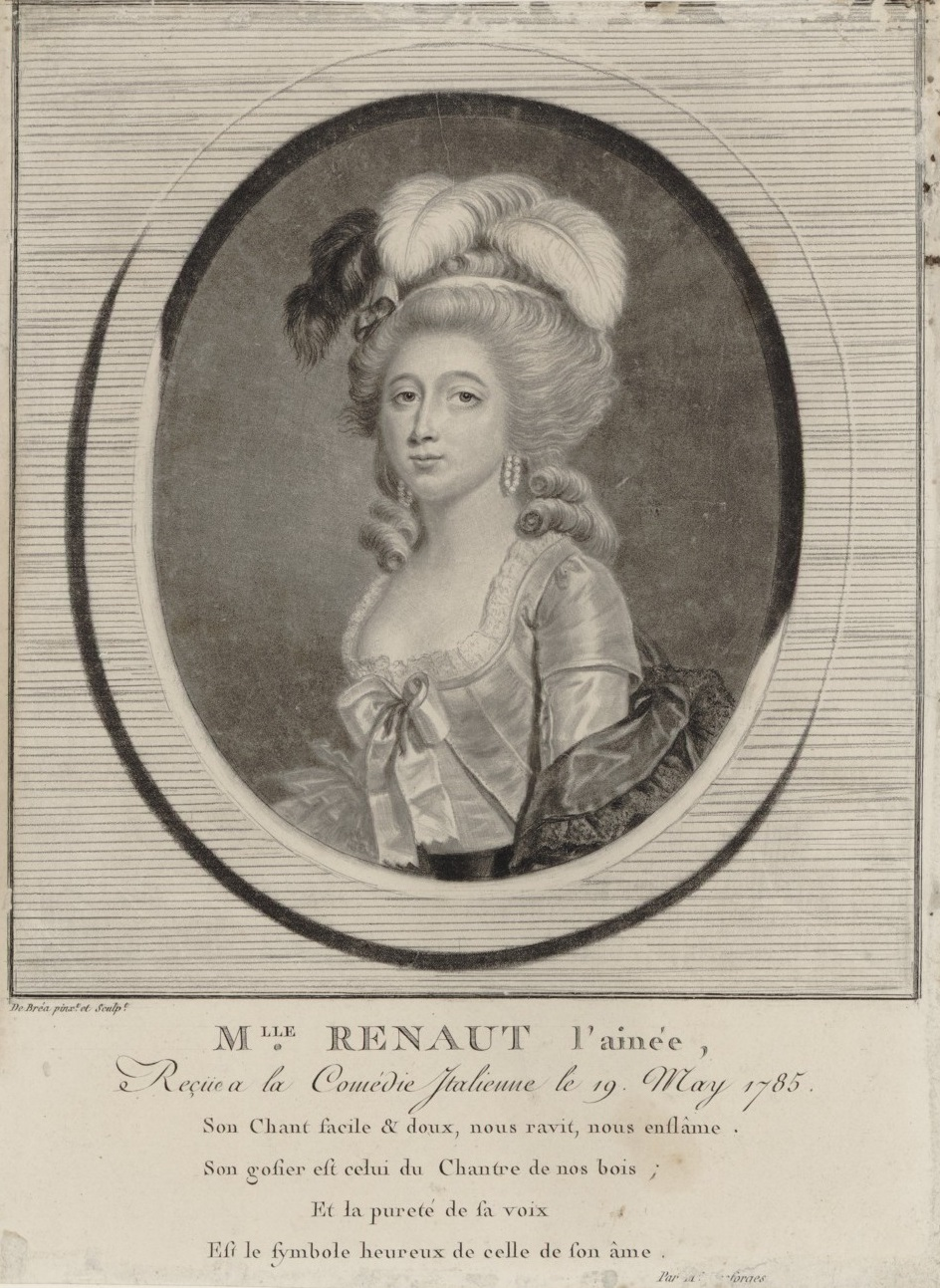
De Bréa's 1785 portrait of Renaud

According to François-Joseph Fétis in his Biographie universelle des musiciens, Rose Renaud was known as "Mademoiselle Renaud l'aînée" to distinguish her from her sister Sophie. The same appellation is used in a portrait by De Bréa published in 1785 and entitled Mlle Renaut l'aînée. Reçue à la Comédie Italienne le 19 May 1785 (Mlle Renaut [sic] the elder. Received into the Comédie Italienne on 19 May 1785). The Bibliothèque nationale de France identifies the subject of the portrait as "Rose Renaud".

De Bréa's portrait of Renaud was accompanied by a poem which read:

Her singing, effortless and sweet, ravishes us, sets us on fire,

Her voice is that of the nightingale;

And the purity of her voice

Is the happy symbol of her soul. (Note: Original French: "Son Chante facile & doux nous ravit, nous enflâme. / Son gosier est celui du Chantre de nos bois; / Et la pureté de sa voix / Est le symbole heureux de celle de son âme.")

However, in his biography of Méhul, first published in Le Ménestrel in 1884, Arthur Pougin claimed that Fétis was wrong and that there were actually three Renaud sisters, Rose, Sophie, and their elder sister whose first name was unknown but was called "Mademoiselle Renaud l'aînée". Pougin based his account of the Renaud sisters and their relationship to Méhul (especially Rose's) on lengthy quotes from the 1833 memoirs of Antoine-Vincent Arnault, Souvenirs d'un sexagénaire (Souvenirs of a Sexagenarian). Arnault had been a close friend of Méhul from the 1790s and wrote the libretto for his opera Mélidore et Phrosine.

In his 1880 Les Comédiens du roi de la troupe italienne, Émile Campardon likewise refers to three Renaud sisters. In that book most of the biographical data given by Fétis for Rose Renaud is assigned to a singer Campardon calls "Mademoiselle Renaud l'aînée" (no first name given). Campardon refers to a second sister as "Mademoiselle Renaud cadette" (Note: "Cadette" is a French term for a younger sister.) (no first name given) who made her debut on 22 October 1785 in the role of Babette in Nicolas Dezède's Le trois fermiers. He refers to Sophie Renaud by name as the third and youngest sister. A contemporary review of Le trois fermiers in Journal de Paris also stated that it marked the Théâtre-Italien debut of "Mademoiselle Renaud cadette" singing the role of Babette and that "Mademoiselle Renaud l'aînée" was also in the cast.

Further support for the existence of the third and eldest sister comes from a March 1790 review in Le Moniteur Universel of Henri-Montan Berton's opera Les brouilleries, a comédie mêlée d'ariettes in three acts to a libretto by Loeillard d'Avrigny. According to the review and a later account by Arsène Houssaye, Berton had specifically composed the work for the voice of "Mademoiselle Renaud l'aînée". When illness prevented her from performing in its premiere at the Théâtre-Italien, Rose Renaud sang the role in her place to great success.

Both Campardon and Pougin assert that it was the eldest of the three sisters who had married Loeillard d'Avrigny, not Rose. The entry for "Renaud" in the German music encyclopedia Encyclopädie der gesammten musikalischen Wissenschaften published in 1837 lists only two sisters, Rose and an elder sister whose first name was unknown, but like Campardon and Pougin, states that it was the elder sister who married d'Avrigny. In Etienne-Nicolas Méhul and Opera, musicologist Elizabeth Bartlet gives the name of d'Avrigny's wife as "Marie-Reine née Renaud".

According to the entry in Encyclopädie der gesammten musikalischen Wissenschaften, both Rose and her elder sister were born in France but spent much of their childhood in Italy where their father worked as a violinist.
