= Pierre le Grand =

1790 opera by André Grétry

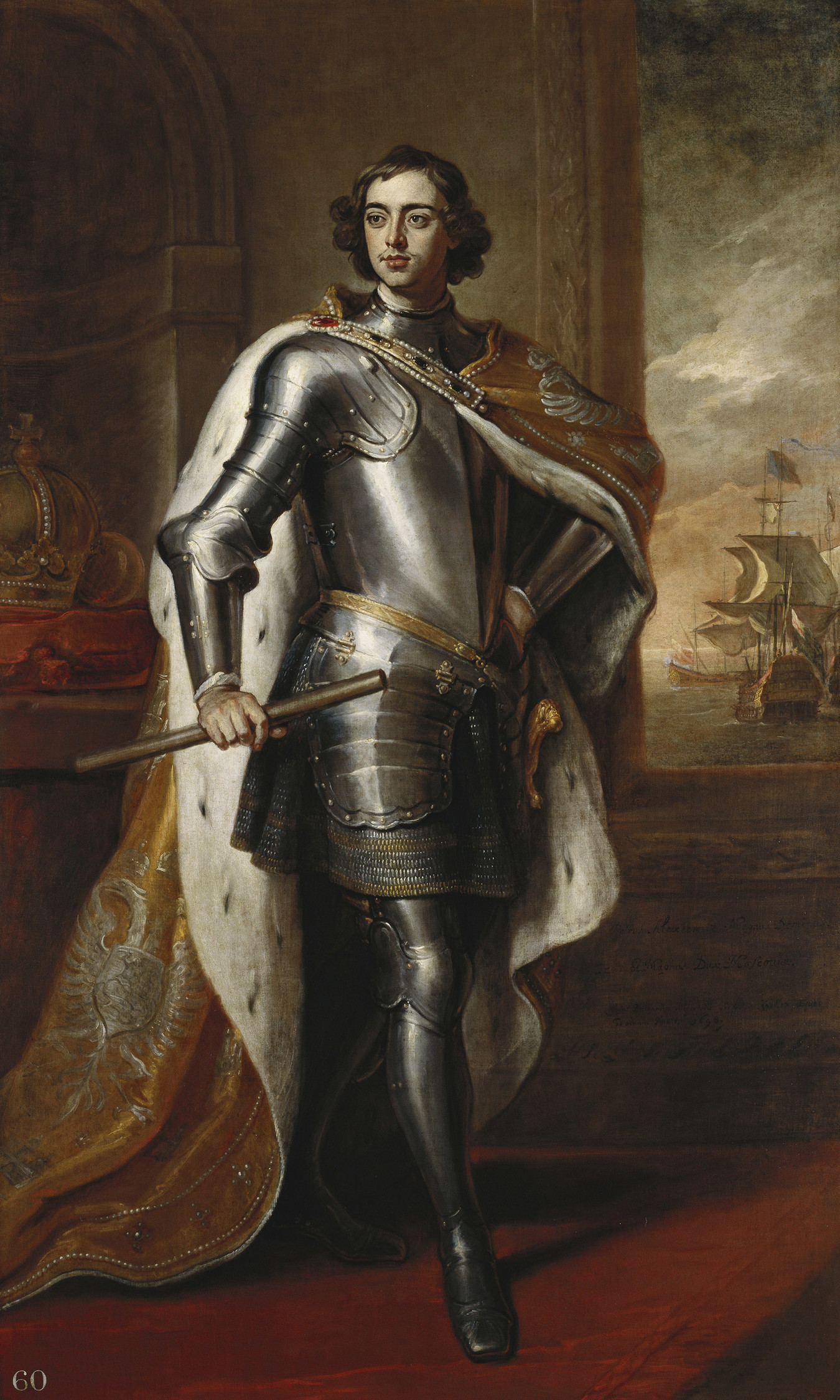
Portrait of Peter I by Godfrey Kneller, 1698.

Pierre le Grand (Peter the Great) is an opéra comique by André Grétry. The libretto, by Jean-Nicolas Bouilly, is based on the early life of the Russian tsar Peter the Great. It was first performed in Paris on January 13, 1790, with Louise-Rosalie Lefebvre, known as Madame Dugazon, as Catherine.

== Roles ==
Role	Voice type	Premiere Cast, January 13, 1790 (Conductor: - )
Peter the Great, Tsar of all Rus'	tenor	Philippe Cauvy, 'Philippe'
François Le Fort, a minister and a friend of the Tsar	basse-taille (bass-baritone)	Simon Chénard
Menshikoff, the governor of Moscow	spoken	Pierre-Philibert Granger
Catherine, a young widow who has retired in the Village	soprano	Louise-Rosalie Lefebvre, 'Madame Dugazon'
Georges-Morin, a master carpenter with whom there lodge Catherine, Peter the Great under the simple name of Pierre, and Le Fort under the name of André	basse-taille (bass-baritone)	Pierre-Marie Narbonne
Géneviève, Georges-Morin's wife	soprano	Françoise Carpentier, 'Madame Gonthier'
Caroline, Georges-Morin and Géneviève's daughter	soprano	Jeanne-Charlotte Schroeder, 'Madame Saint-Aubin'
Aléxis, a young orphan, son of a rich bailiff, in love with Caroline	soprano	Sophie Renaud ("Mlle Renault la jeune'")
Maturin, an old man, great-uncle and guardian of Aléxis	tenor	Charles-Nicolas-Joseph-Justin Favart
The tabellion	spoken (?)	Jean-René Lecoupay de la Rosière, 'Rosière'

== Synopsis ==
The plot tells how the young Tsar Peter disguised himself as a carpenter to work in a Russian shipyard where he fell in love with and married a peasant girl, Catherine (later the Empress Catherine I). Bouilly was working on his play at the time the French Revolution was breaking out in 1789 and the work reflects the political events of the day. Tsar Peter is intended to symbolise King Louis XVI, Catherine is Marie Antoinette, and the Swiss Le Fort alludes to the Genevan financier Jacques Necker, who had attempted to reform the French economy. Peter and Catherine are depicted as ideal figures, deeply concerned for the welfare of the common people, and the liberal Bouilly clearly hoped the French king and queen would follow their example.

== Recordings ==
- (La jeunesse de) Pierre le Grand — Christophe Einhorn, Anne-Sophie Schmidt, Philippe Le Chevalier, Namur Chamber Choir, Chamber Orchestra, conducted by Olivier Opdebeeck (CD on Cascavelle or DVD on Disques DOM, 2001, live in Compiègne)
- Pierre le Grand — Maxim Mironov, Elena Voznessenskaya, Nikolai Galin, Chorus and Orchestra of Helikon Opera, conducted by Sergey Stadler (DVD on Arthaus, 101 097, shot in Moscow in 2002)
