= Grotte des Demoiselles =

Coordinates: 43°54′28″N 3°44′43″E

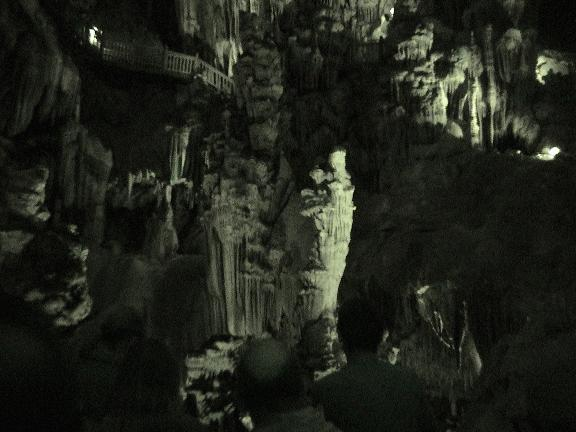
Photo taken in the chamber known as the Cathédrale des Abîmes

The Grotte des Demoiselles is a large cave located in the Hérault valley of southern France, near Ganges, about 60 km (37 mi) west of Nîmes. Its entrance is located on the territory of the commune of Saint-Bauzille-de-Putois.

== History ==
Many legends and stories have been linked with the cave, the existence of which has been common knowledge in the Languedoc region since time immemorial. The best known legend tells of a shepherd looking for a lost lamb who wandered into the swallow hole that marked the entrance to the cave. He heard the lamb but could not see it, and so he continued deeper and deeper into the cave, until he reached the chamber now known as the cathédrale (cathedral). With only a torch for light, he slipped and fell to the bottom of the chamber (a 60-metre plunge between stalactites and stalagmites). Knocked senseless by the shock, he noticed—just before passing out—a group of young ladies dancing and singing around him. When he woke up, he was back on the surface with his lamb. The modern name of the cave, Grotte des Demoiselles (“maidens' grotto”) reflects this legend; previously it had been known as the Grotte des Fées (“fairies' grotto”).

At various times in history the cave has also served as a hiding place and refuge. An early explorer of the cave was the composer Benoît-Joseph Marsollier in July 1780. In 1889, more serious exploration of the cave was undertaken by the renowned speleologist Édouard-Alfred Martel. At the time, visiting the cave was quite perilous, but in 1931 a funicular, concrete stairs and walkways with sturdy railings and extensive electric lighting were installed to make it accessible to the general public; and since then it has been a popular regional tourist attraction.

== Formation of the cave ==
The Grotte des Demoiselles is thought to have initially been formed by the collapse of overlying limestone, made fragile by water erosion. However, some doubt remains as to the source of the water: it may have been an underground stream that has now disappeared, or it may have been a stream that is now about 300 metres (~980 ft) lower, although no link with the latter has been discovered thus far.

== See also ==
- List of caves
