= Étienne-Joseph Floquet =

French composer (1748–1785)

Étienne-Joseph Floquet (23 November 1748 – 10 May 1785) was a French composer, mainly of operas. He was born in Aix-en-Provence and began his career by writing church music, before moving to Paris in 1767. There, Floquet made a name for himself with the requiem he wrote for the funeral of the composer Jean-Joseph de Mondonville in 1772. Floquet's first work for the Paris Opéra, the ballet héroïque L'union de l'amour et les arts, was a triumph, enjoying 60 performances between its premiere in September 1773 and January 1774. The audience at the premiere was so enthusiastic that the performance had to be stopped several times because of the applause and, at the final curtain, Floquet was presented on stage, the first composer in the history of the Paris Opéra to enjoy such an honour. However, the arrival of the German composer Christoph Willibald Gluck in Paris later that year changed French musical taste and Floquet's style became unfashionable. After the failure of his next opera, Azolan, Floquet decided to travel to Italy to perfect his musical education. There he studied composition under Nicola Sala in Naples and counterpoint under Padre Martini in Bologna, where he turned momentarily back to church music composing a Te Deum.

Floquet returned to France in 1777 to find the Parisian public was now split between the supporters of Gluck and the partisans of the Italian Niccolò Piccinni. There was little demand for operas by native French composers and Floquet struggled to have his tragédie lyrique Hellé staged. When it eventually appeared in 1779, it was booed, despite Floquet's attempt to imitate the style of Piccinni, and ran for only three performances. Floquet had more success with the lighter Le seigneur bienfaisant and La nouvelle Omphale. He turned to a tragic subject once more when he produced a new musical score for Philippe Quinault's libretto Alceste, originally set by Jean-Baptiste Lully in 1674. Floquet's version was rehearsed but then rejected by the Paris Opéra. The composer was in poor health and the disappointment at his failure to have Alceste staged was said to have contributed to his early death soon afterwards. He left two unfinished operas, one of which, the "fairyland opera" (opéra féerie) Alcindor, was completed by Nicolas Dezède and given its unsuccessful première on 17 April 1787.

== Operas ==
Title	Genre	Subdivisions	Libretto	Première date	Theatre	References for the information
L'union de l'amour et les arts	ballet héroïque	3 entrées	Pierre-René Lemonnier	7 September 1773	Paris Opéra	Dratwicki, Antoine Dauvergne, p. 297; Rushton in Grove; Pitou, pp. 534–535
Azolan, ou Le serment indiscret	opéra-ballet	3 entrées	Lemonnier, based on a story by Voltaire	15 November 1774	Paris Opéra	Clément and Larousse Dictionnaire des opéras, p. 73; Pitou, p. 60
Hellé	tragédie lyrique	3 acts	Lemonnier	5 January 1779	Paris Opéra	Pitou, p. 269
Le seigneur bienfaisant	opéra	3 acts	Marc-Antoine-Jacques Rochon de Chabannes	14 December 1780	Paris Opéra	Clément and Larousse Dictionnaire des opéras, p. 614; Pitou, pp. 493–494
La nouvelle Omphale	comédie mêlée d'ariettes in prose	3 acts	"Madame de Beaunoir" (pseudonym of Alexandre L. B. Robineau)	22 November 1782	Premiered at Versailles, transferred to the Théâtre des Italiens, Paris on 28 December 1782	Title page of original edition
Grisélidis	opéra comique	3 acts		unperformed		Rushton in Grove (date of composition: 1783)
Le triomphe d'Alcide (Alceste)	tragédie lyrique	5 acts	Jean-Paul-André Razins de Saint-Marc after Philippe Quinault (originally set by Lully, 1674)	music written 1783—84; rehearsed 1785 but never performed	intended for the Paris Opéra	Rushton in Grove; Buford Norman, p. 341
Les françaises	opéra comique	1 act	Rochon de Chabannes	unperformed		Rushton in Grove (date of composition uncertain; perhaps 1784)
Alcindor (music finished by Nicolas Dezède)	opéra féerie	3 acts	Rochon de Chabannes	17 April 1788	Paris Opéra	Rushton in Grove; David J. Buch, Magic Flutes, p. 99; Pitou, pp. 21–22
La chasse (incomplete)			Jean-Paul-André Razins de Saint-Marc	unperformed		Rushton in Grove (date of composition: 1785)

== Sources ==
- David J. Buch, Magic Flutes and Enchanted Forests: The Supernatural in Eighteenth-Century Musical Theater (University of Chicago Press, 2009)
- (in French) Félix Clément and Pierre Larousse Dictionnaire des opéras (Paris, 1881) Available online at Open Library
- (in French) Benoît Dratwicki, Antoine Dauvergne (1713—1797): une carrière tourmentée dans la France musicale des Lumières, Editions Mardaga, 2011.
- Benoît Dratwicki, "Foreigners at the Académie Royale de Musique" in Antonio Sacchini, Renaud, Madrid, Ediciones Singulares, 2013 (book accompanying the complete recording conducted by Christophe Rousset). ISBN 978-84-939-6865-6
- (in French) Buford Norman Quinault, librettiste de Lully: le poète des grâces, Editions Madraga, 2009.
- Spire Pitou, The Paris Opéra. An Encyclopedia of Operas, Ballets, Composers, and Performers – Rococo and Romantic, 1715–1815, Westport/London, Greenwood Press, 1985. ISBN 0-313-24394-8
- Julian Rushton, article "Floquet, Étienne-Joseph" in The New Grove Dictionary of Music and Musicians
