= Guillaume Tell (Grétry) =

Opéra comique by André-Ernest-Modeste Grétry

Title page of the libretto

Guillaume Tell (William Tell) is an opéra comique, described as a drame mise en musique, in three acts by André Grétry, The French text was by Michel-Jean Sedaine based on a play of the same name by Antoine-Marin Lemierre.

== Performance history ==
It was first performed by the Comédie-Italienne at the first Salle Favart in Paris on 9 April 1791 and was revived on 24 May 1828 at the Salle Feydeau in a version much revised by Henri-Montan Berton with music borrowed from other works of Grétry, including Amphitryon, Céphale et Procris, Aucassin et Nicolette, Callias, and Élisca, and a new libretto by Jean-Baptiste Pélissier. Grétry's Guillaume Tell disappeared from the repertoire as Rossini's 1829 opera on the same subject gained preference.

An Opéra royal de Wallonie production at the Theatre Royal in Liege in July 2013 featured Marc Laho in the title role and was conducted by Claudio Scimone.

== Roles ==
Role	Voice type	Premiere Cast, 9 April 1791 (Conductor: – )
Guesler	baritone	Simon Chénard
Guillaume Tell	tenor	Philippe Cauvy, 'Philippe'
Madame Tell	soprano	Desforges
Marie, Guillaume Tell's daughter	soprano	Rose Renaud
Melktal, the son	tenor	Elvion
Melktal, the father	baritone	Pierre-Marie Narbonne
An officer		Solier
An old man		Favard
Surlemann		Granger
A traveller		Menier
Traveller's wife		Lescaut
Traveller's little girl		Chénard
Chorus: Soldiers, village boys and girls, people

== Synopsis ==
The opera is set in 13th-century Switzerland. Like Rossini's later work of the same name, it portrays the heroic struggle of the liberty-aspiring Swiss patriots led by Tell against the evil and oppressive Austrians under Guesler, the local governor.

== Recording ==
- Guillaume Tell, Marco Laho (Guillaume Tell), Anne-Catherine Gillet (Madame Tell), Lionel Lhote (Gessler), Orchestre et Chœurs de l'Opéra royal de Wallonie, conducted by Claudio Scimone (Musique en Wallonie, 1 CD, 2013)

== Sources ==
- Casaglia, Gherardo (2005)."Guillaume Tell, 9 April 1791". L'Almanacco di Gherardo Casaglia (in Italian).
- Charlton, David (1992). Guillaume Tell in The New Grove Dictionary of Opera, edited by Stanley Sadie. London: Macmillan. ISBN 0333734327
- Karl-Josef Kutsch and Leo Riemens (2003). Großes Sängerlexikon (fourth edition, in German). Munich: K. G. Saur. ISBN 9783598115981.
- Wild, Nicole; Charlton, David (2005). Théâtre de l'Opéra-Comique Paris: répertoire 1762-1972. Sprimont, Belgium: Editions Mardaga. ISBN 9782870098981.
