= Nina (Dalayrac) =

French opéra-comique by Nicolas Dalayrac

- Opéra-comique by Nicolas Dalayrac
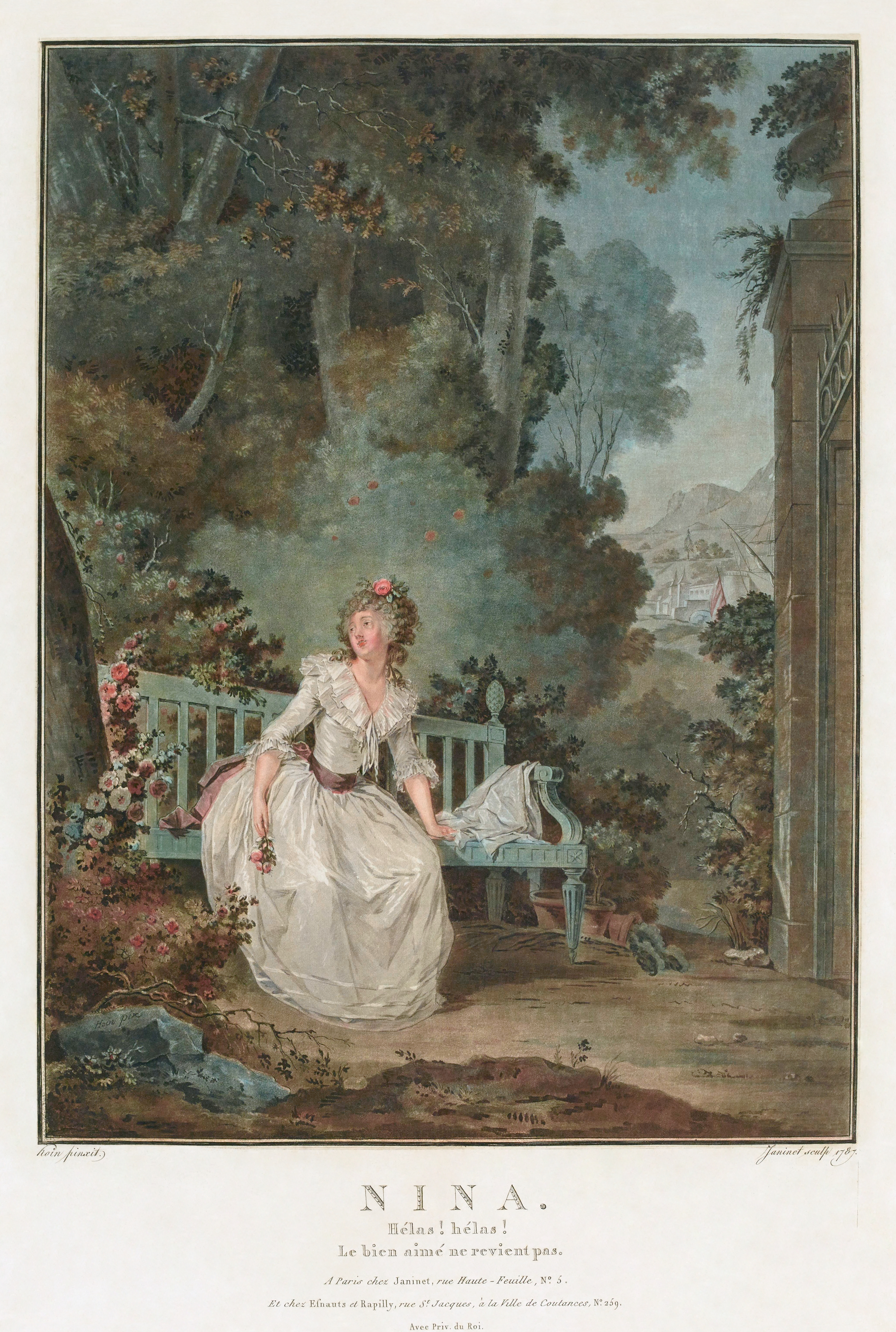
- Louise Dugazon in the title role
- Librettist: Benoît-Joseph Marsollier des Vivetières
- Language: French
- Based on: Short story by Baculard d'Arnaud
- Premiere: 15 May 1786; Comédie-Italienne, Paris

Nina, ou La folle par amour (Nina, or The Woman Crazed with Love) is an opéra-comique in one act by the French composer Nicolas Dalayrac. It was first performed on 15 May 1786 by the Comédie-Italienne at the first Salle Favart in Paris. The libretto, by Benoît-Joseph Marsollier des Vivetières, is based on a short story by Baculard d'Arnaud.

== Background and performance history ==
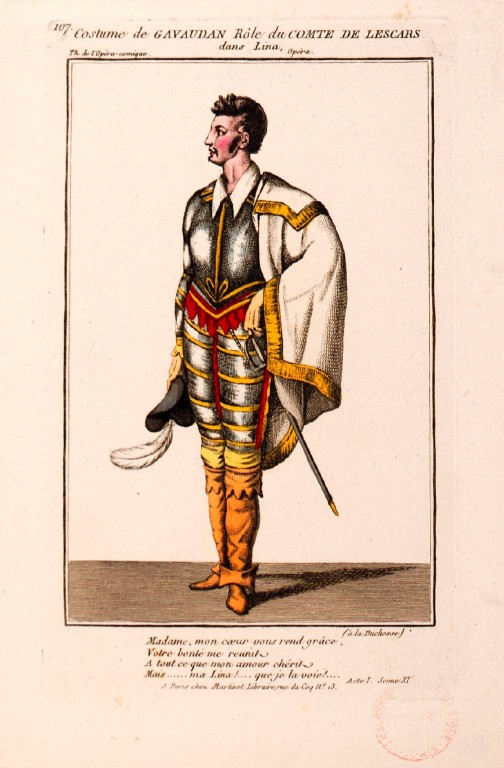
Jean-Baptiste-Sauveur Gavaudan as the comte de Lescars in Nina ou la folle par amour (1820)

Nina was Dalayrac's first collaboration with Marsollier des Vivetières, who would go on to write many more librettos for him, including Les deux petits savoyards. Revived by the Opéra-Comique at the Salle Feydeau in July 1802, Nina was a popular success, which it remained until receiving its last performance by the company in 1852. It was also performed in translation in London and Hamburg in 1787 and in Italy in 1788.

Its most famous aria, "Quand le bien-aimé reviendra" ("When my sweetheart returns to me"), is mentioned by Hector Berlioz in his Memoirs as his "first musical experience" (he heard an adaptation of the melody sung during his First Communion).

The English writer, agriculturalist and eye-witness to the French Revolution's early years, Arthur Young, writing in Travels in France, was in the audience of a performance of Nina in Rouen on 13 October 1788. The lead was sung by Madame Cretal from Paris and "it proved to be the richest treat I have received from the French theatre."

In 1813 Dalayrac's score for Nina was adapted as a ballet by Louis Milon and Louis-Luc Loiseau de Persuis with Émilie Bigottini in the title role. In the ballet version, "Quand le bien-aimé reviendra" is played as a solo for cor anglais. It was at one of the early performances of this ballet that Berlioz remembered the melody he had heard in his childhood.

Giovanni Paisiello had also set the libretto in an Italian version adapted by Giambattista Lorenzi. Paisiello's Nina, which premiered in 1789 is still performed today, while Dalayrac's has fallen into obscurity.

== Roles ==
Cast	Voice type	Premiere, 15 May 1786
Nina, the Count's daughter, having lost her mind some months beforehand	soprano	Louise Dugazon
The Count, her father	taille (baritenor)	Philippe Cauvy, called 'M. Philippe'
Georges, the Count's foster-father	basse-taille (bass-baritone)	Pierre-Marie Narbonne
Elise, Nina's confidante and housekeeper	soprano	Mme Gonthier (née Françoise Carpentier)
Germeuil, Nina's sweetheart, believed dead	taille	Louis Michu
Mathurine, a peasant woman	soprano	Mme La Caille (also spelled Lacaille)
Peasant girls	sopranos	Rosalie de Saint-Évreux ('Mlle Rosalie'), Mlle Méliancourt, Mlle Lefevre, Mlle Renaud 'Cadette' (the younger), Mlle Chevalier
Peasants, old men, youth

== Synopsis ==
Nina is in love with Germeuil but her father, Count Lindoro, favours another suitor. Germeuil and his rival fight a duel. Nina believes that Germeuil has been killed and goes mad, forgetting aspects of the traumatic incident in a manner consistent with a diagnosis of psychogenic amnesia. She only regains her reason when Germeuil reappears unharmed and her father finally allows him to marry her.

== Recordings ==
Although there are no full-length recordings of Nina, its most famous aria, "Quand le bien-aimé reviendra", can be heard on Serate Musicali (Joan Sutherland (soprano), Richard Bonynge (piano), Decca, 2006)

== In popular culture ==
The opera is referenced by name and synopsis in Episode 5, Season 4 of the science fiction series Stranger Things. Incongruously, this reference is accompanied by the playing of an aria, Il mio ben quando verrà (When my beloved comes), from Giovanni Paisiello's opera of parallel name, year, and subject.
