= Le jeune Henri =

- Opera by Étienne Méhul
- Méhul in 1799 – portrait by Antoine Gros
- Librettist: Jean-Nicolas Bouilly
- Language: French
- Premiere: 1 May 1797; Théâtre Favart, Paris

Le jeune Henri (Young Henri) is an opera by the French composer Étienne Méhul. It takes the form of a comédie mêlée de musique (a type of opéra comique) in two acts. The libretto, by Jean-Nicolas Bouilly, is based on an episode from the life of King Henri IV of France. It was first performed on 1 May 1797 at the Théâtre Favart in Paris. The opera was a failure but the overture was warmly applauded and has often been performed separately since. Known as La chasse du jeune Henri ("Young Henri's hunt"), it is a piece of programme music describing the course of a hunt from dawn to the killing of the stag.

Bouilly was later to become famous as the author of Léonore, ou L'amour conjugal (1798), the basis of Beethoven's only opera, Fidelio. He had written the libretto for Le jeune Henri (under the title La jeunesse de Henri IV) in 1791 for Grétry, who had turned it down. Méhul had composed the score but the first staging had been delayed for years for political reasons. The premiere was a "major disaster" thanks to the poor quality of Bouilly's libretto. The audience applauded Méhul but hissed Bouilly. A reviewer in Le courrier des spectacles wrote that "it would be impossible to imagine anything worse" and that there was "no intrigue, no action, nothing of interest."

The overture was encored at the premiere and became a favourite orchestral piece throughout the 19th century. It contains traditional hunting horn calls taken from Philidor's opera Tom Jones. It influenced the "Royal Hunt and Storm" in Berlioz's Les Troyens.

== Roles ==
Roles and cast taken from Pougin, p. 142, note 1.

Role	Voice type	Premiere Cast
Henri	soprano (role travesti)	Marie Gabrielle Malagrida ("Mademoiselle Carline")
Isaure	soprano	Anne-Marie Simonet ("Madame Crétu")
Clémentine	soprano	Jeanne-Charlotte Schroeder ("Madame Saint-Aubin")
Christine	soprano	Françoise Carpentier ("Madame Gonthier")
Suzanne	soprano	Mademoiselle Lejeune
Valence	haute-contre	Augustin Alexandre d'Herbez ("Saint-Aubin")
Sévéro	baritone	Jean-Pierre Solié
Daniel	basse-taille (bass-baritone)	Simon Chénard
Jacques	tenor	Philippe Cauvy ("Philippe")
Fideli	tenor?	Mr Allaire
Antoine	?	Paulin

== Recordings ==
There have been several recordings of the overture:

- Included on Sir Thomas Beecham Conducts Berlioz, Grétry, Méhul and Massenet with Sir Thomas Beecham conducting the Royal Philharmonia Orchestra (Sony Classical reissue, 2003)
- Included on Méhul Overtures, Orchestre de Bretagne, conducted by Stefan Sanderling (ASV, 2002)
- Included on Méhul The Complete Symphonies, Orchestra of the Gulbenkian Foundation, conducted by Michel Swierczewski (Nimbus Records, 1989)

== Sources ==
- Adélaïde de Place Étienne Nicolas Méhul (Bleu Nuit Éditeur, 2005) pp. 104–105
- Arthur Pougin Méhul: sa vie, son génie, son caractère (Fischbacher, 1889)
- Malcolm Boyd (ed.) Music and the French Revolution (Cambridge University Press, 2008)
- Booklet notes to the Sanderling recording by Ates Orga
