= Anne-Catherine Gillet =

Belgian opera singer

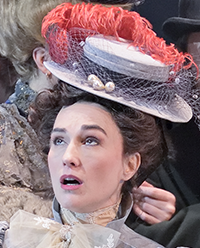
Anne-Catherine Gillet

Anne-Catherine Gillet (born 20 January 1975) is a Belgian operatic soprano.

== Life and career ==
Born in Libramont-Chevigny, Gillet studied singing at the Conservatoire royal de Liège with Nicolas Christou.

== Career ==
- Sophie in Der Rosenkavalier by Richard Strauss, Théâtre du Capitole de Toulouse, 2008
- Constance in Dialogues of the Carmelites, 2009
- Perséphone in The Brussels Requiem by Howard Moddy, at La Monnaie, 2010
- Musetta in La Bohème, Puccini, 2010, at La Monnaie, 2010
- Sophie in Werther by Massenet, Opéra Bastille, 2010
- Despina in Così fan tutte by Mozart, Opéra Garnier, 2011
- Cendrillon by Massenet, at La Monnaie, 2011
- Aricie in Hippolyte et Aricie by Jean-Philippe Rameau, Opéra Garnier, 2012
- Micaëla in Carmen by Georges Bizet, Opéra de Marseille, 2012
- Madame Tell in Guillaume Tell by André Grétry, Opéra Royal de Wallonie, 2013
- Oscar in Un ballo in maschera by Verdi at the chorégies d'Orange in August 2013
- Manon Lescaut in Manon by Jules Massenet at the Opéra de Lausanne in October 2014
- Gilda in Rigoletto by Verdi at the Bolshoi Theatre in December 2014
- Pamina in The Magic Flute by Mozart at the Opéra Royal de Wallonie, December 2015 – January 2016
- Leila in The Pearl Fishers by Bizet at the Théâtre du Capitole, Toulouse, September-October 2023

== Discography ==
- Patrick Ringal-Daxhelet, Anne-Catherine Gillet, Claude Flagel, Patrick Baton (dir.), André Souris – Œuvres symphoniques, Cypres 7607, 2006
- Maria Riccarda Wesseling, Maria Bayo, Deborah York, Núria Rial, Anne-Catherine Gillet, Max Emmanuel Cencic, Kobie Van Rensburg. Dir.: Eduardo López Banzo, Al Ayre Español, Rodrigo (Handel), Naïve Ambroisie, 2008
- Jonas Kaufmann, Sophie Koch, Ludovic Tezier, Anne-Catherine Gillet, Orchestre et Chœurs de l'Opéra de Paris, Michel Plasson, Massenet : Werther, Opéra national de Paris, DVD Decca NTSC 0440 074 3406 2 GH 2, 2010
- Anna Caterina Antonacci, Andrew Richards, Anne-Catherine Gillet, Nicolas Cavallier and John Eliot Gardiner, Carmen, FRA Musica 3770002003060, 2010
- Anne-Catherine Gillet, Orchestre Philharmonique royal de Liège, Paul Daniel (dir.), Barber: Knoxville, Berlioz: Les nuits d'été, Britten: Les Illuminations, Aeon 760058 360132, 2011.
- Zanetta in a complete recording of La princesse de Trébizonde with Paul Daniel conducting the London Philharmonic Orchestra released by Opera Rara in 2023.
