= Henri-Joseph Rigel =

German-born composer (1741 - 1799)

Henri-Joseph Rigel (9 February 1741 – 2 May 1799) was a German-born composer of the Classical era who spent most of his working life in France. He was born in Wertheim am Main where his father was musical intendant to the local prince. After an education in the Holy Roman Empire, where his teachers included Niccolò Jommelli, Rigel moved to Paris in 1767. He quickly acquired a reputation in musical circles and published harpsichord pieces, string quartets, symphonies and concertos. He began composing for the Concert Spirituel, most notably four hiérodrames (oratorios on sacred themes): La sortie d'Egypte (1774), La destruction de Jericho (1778), Jephté (1783) and Les Macchabées (score lost). These show the influence of Christoph Willibald Gluck, and Gluck himself praised La sortie d'Égypte. Between 1778 and 1799 Rigel also wrote 14 operas, including the opéra comique Le savetier et le financier (1778).

== Recordings ==
- Six quatuors dialogués, Opus 10: Quatuor Franz Joseph (Atma Records, 2005)
- La sortie d'Égypte, La destruction de Jéricho, Jephté, three oratorios: Les Chantres du Centre de Musique Baroque de Versailles, Orchestre des Folies Françoises, conducted by Olivier Schneebeli (K617 Records, 2007)
- Symphonies: Concerto Köln (Berlin Classics, 2009)
