= Florine Dezède =

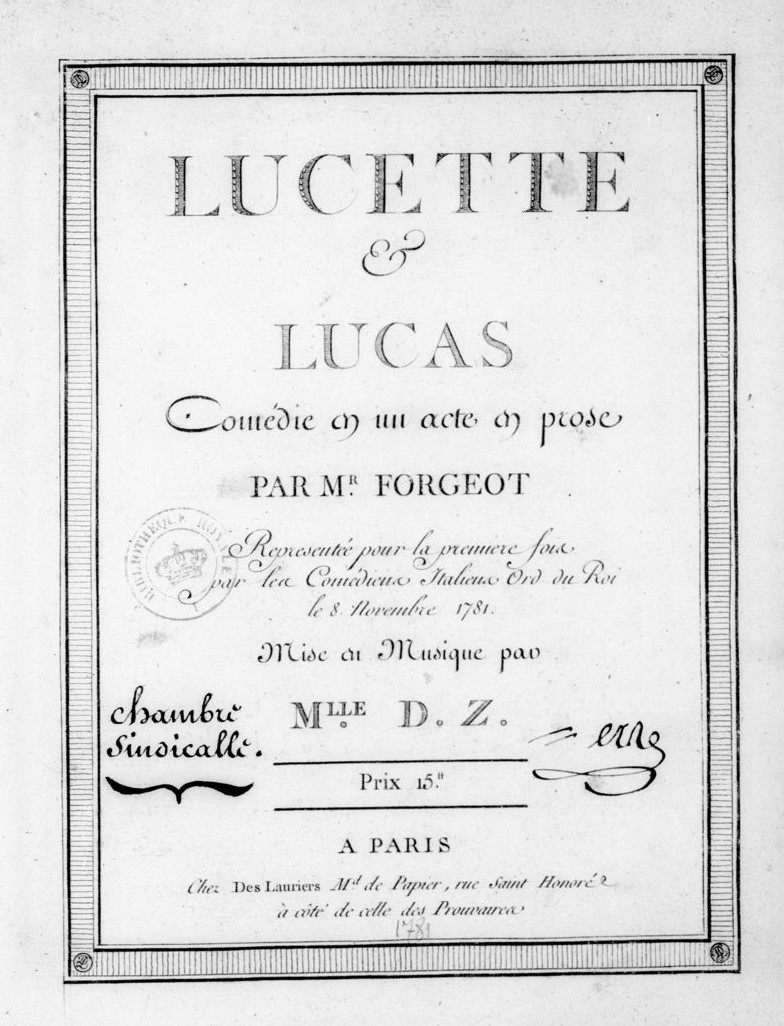
- score of Lucette et Lucas
- Born: 1766
- Died: 1792 (aged 25–26)
- Occupation: Composer
- Parent(s): Nicolas Dezède

Florine Dezède (1766–1792) was a French composer, known for the opera Lucette et Lucas. She was one of the most celebrated female composers of the 1780s.

Florine Dezède was the daughter of composer Nicolas Dezède. Little is known about her life.

Lucette et Lucas is a one-act comédie mêlée d'ariettes with a libretto by Nicolas-Julien Forgeot. It is a sentimental story of young lovers Lucette and Lucas who must comedically outwit those opposed to their marriage.

The Comédie-Italienne premiered Lucette et Lucas at the Hôtel de Bourgogne on 8 November 1781. It was a mainstay of their repertoire, often paired with an opera by her father. There were 43 performances in the next decade, including one at Versailles in 1782. The score was published in 1786.
