= L'irato =

- Opéra comique by Étienne Méhul
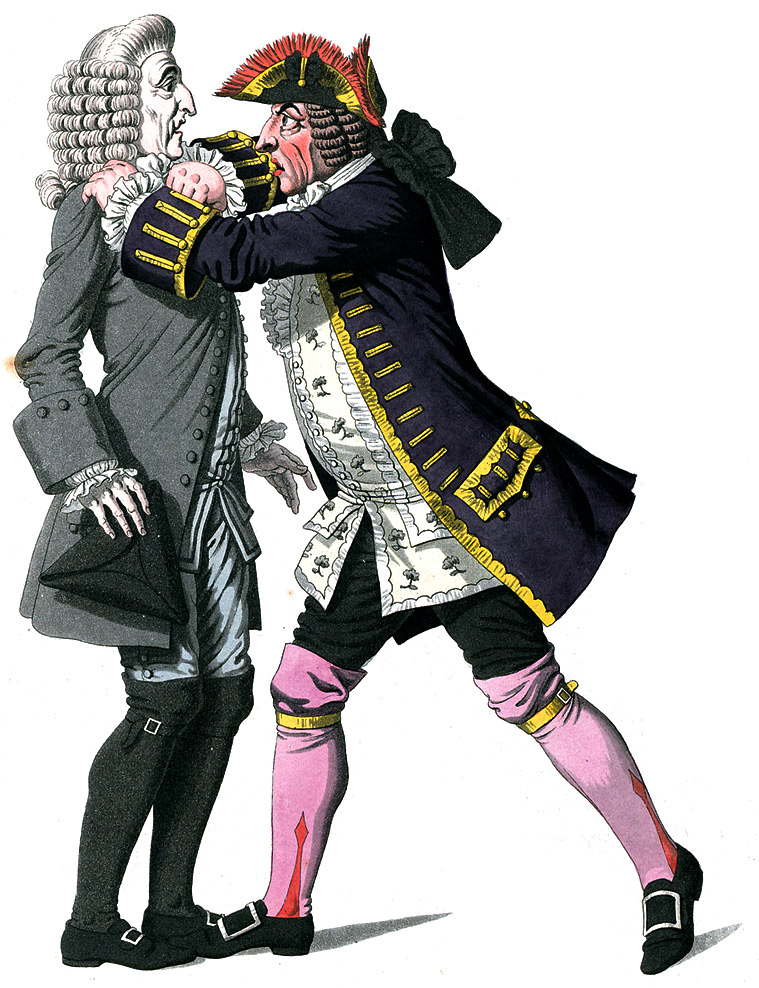
- Doctor Balnardus und Pandolfo, Berlin 1804
- Librettist: Benoît-Joseph Marsollier
- Language: French
- Premiere: 17 February 1801; Opéra-Comique (Théâtre Favart), Paris

L'irato, ou L'emporté (The Angry Man) is an opéra-comique (styled an opéra parade) in one act by French composer Étienne Méhul with a libretto by Benoît-Joseph Marsollier. It was first performed at the Théâtre Favart in Paris on 17 February 1801. Written in a lighter style than Méhul's operas of the 1790s, L'irato is famous for being part of a deception the composer played on his friend Napoleon Bonaparte.

== Background and performance history ==
Méhul had been introduced to Napoleon by his wife Josephine and attended weekly meetings with the future emperor at his residence at Malmaison. Here they probably discussed music. Many biographers have wrongly claimed that Napoleon did not like music. In fact he did, but preferred the Italian operas of composers such as Giovanni Paisiello, Wolfgang Amadeus Mozart and Domenico Cimarosa.

According to the harpist Martin Pierre d'Alvimare, Napoleon criticised Méhul "for emulating in his works an all too Teutonic style, more scientific than pleasing." Méhul decided to try his hand at writing a work in a lighter, more Italianate vein and thus trick Napoleon.

On 7 February 1801 the Journal de Paris announced the forthcoming performance of a translation of an Italian piece, L'irato, at the Opéra-Comique. Ten days later, on the day of the premiere, a letter appeared in the Journal claiming to be from a painter who had seen the opera - the work of a young composer called "Signor Fiorelli" - in Naples 15 years before. The letter was probably a fake one from Méhul himself. The opening night, with Napoleon among the audience, was an immense success. The audience demanded to see the author and were very surprised when Méhul appeared on stage to accept their applause. Napoleon took the joke in good part, telling Méhul to "deceive me often like that" ("Trompez-moi souvent ainsi").

L'irato was revived at the Opéra-Comique in 1852 and at the Théâtre-Lyrique in 1868. A performance at the Opéra-Comique on 17 October 1917 marked the centenary of Méhul's death.

== Roles ==
Méhul in 1799; portrait by Antoine Gros

Role	Voice type	Premiere cast, 17 February 1801
Pandolphe, a bad-tempered old man	bass	Jean-Pierre Solié
Lysandre, Pandolphe's nephew	tenor	Jean Elleviou
Scapin, Lysandre's servant	bass	Marzen
Isabelle, the niece of Pandolphe's dead wife	soprano	Philis
Nérine, Isabelle's maid	soprano	Pingenet, ainée
Balouard, Lysandre's former tutor	tenor	Baptiste-Pierre Dardel, called Dozainville

== Synopsis ==
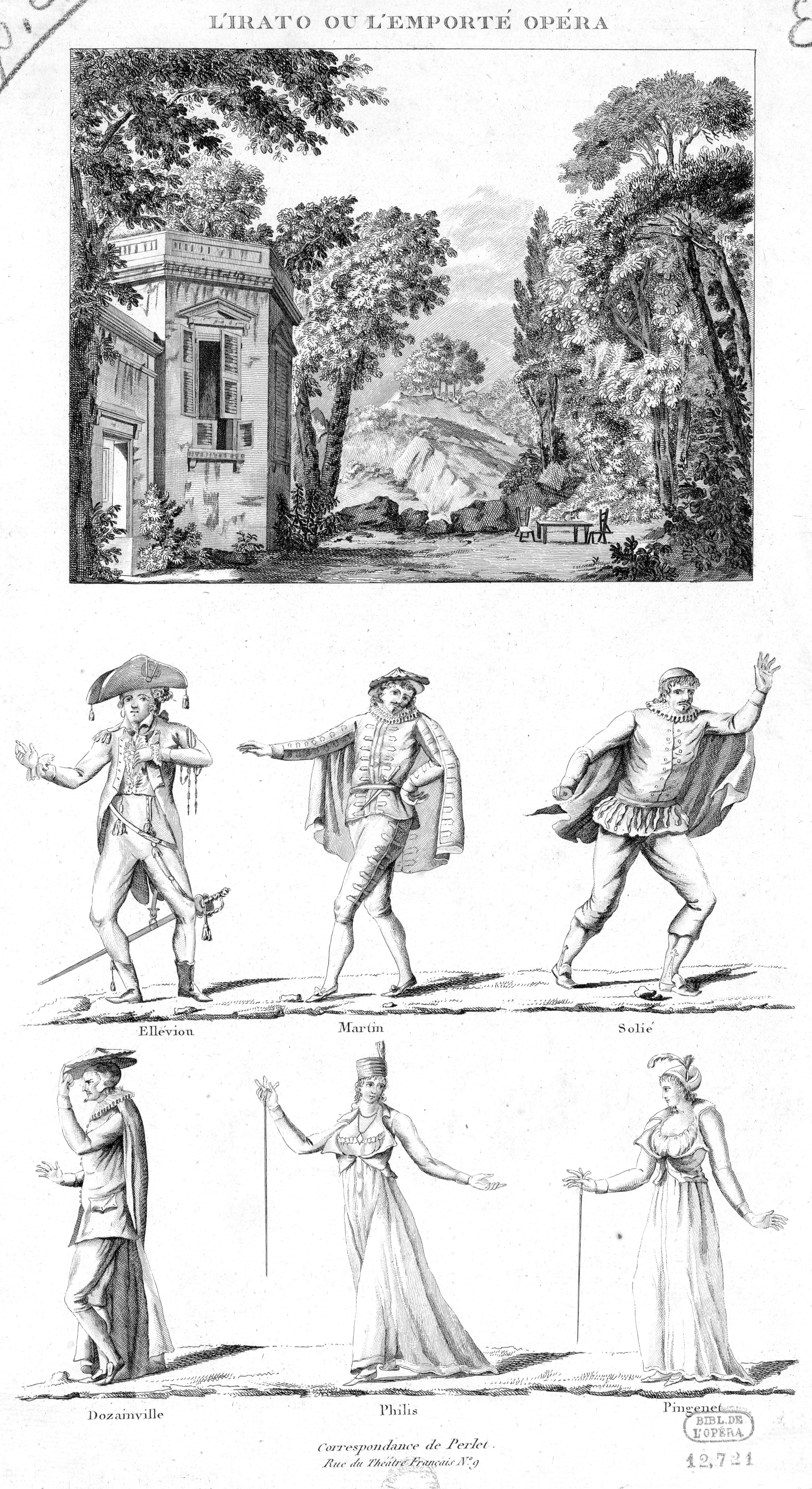
Set and costume designs, 1801

Scene: The garden of Pandolphe's country house near Florence

Pandolphe is a rich but grumpy old man who becomes angry at the slightest thing. He has threatened to disinherit his young nephew Lysandre. As the opera opens, Lysandre is pacing the garden with his servant Scapin, awaiting a meeting with Pandolphe (Aria for Scapin: Promenerons-nous bien longtemps?). Lysandre is in love with Isabelle, but has not heard from her for a month, and Scapin has likewise lost contact with his beloved, Isabelle's maid Nérine. Nevertheless, the two men swear to be faithful forever (Duet:Jurons! Jurons de les aimer toujours!).

Lysandre is enraged at Pandolphe's plans to marry Isabelle to Balouard, his pedantic and ridiculous former tutor. Scapin vows to do everything he can to help his master (Aria: Mais que dis-je?), but he runs off when Pandolphe emerges from the house in a foul temper (Aria for Pandolphe: Ah, les maudites gens!). Pandolphe tells Lysandre he intends to cut him out of his will and throw him out of the house as Lysandre's studied composure irritates him. Lysandre still refuses to become angry. Once Pandolphe has left, Scapin re-enters bringing Isabelle and Nérine with him. Lysandre tells Isabelle of his uncle's plan to marry her off to Balouard. Isabelle is horrified, but Scapin says he has a plot to make Pandolphe angry with Balouard (Quartet: O ciel, que faire?).

Isabelle hopes that feigning vanity and fickleness will deter Balouard (Aria: J'ai de la raison). Pandolphe introduces Isabelle to Balouard. Isabelle hints she already has a lover, which makes Balouard decline the marriage offer, much to Pandolphe's chagrin. Lysandre, who does not yet know the good news, is in a desperate state (Couplets: Si je perdais mon Isabelle). Scapin encourages Lysandre to drown his sorrows with the equally sad Balouard and the three sing in praise of wine and woman (Trio: Femme jolie et du bon vin). As Balouard becomes ever more drunk, the chorus mock him by comparing him to the god Mars (Chorus: Qu'il est joli, qu'il est charmant).

Isabelle and Nérine escape from the house in which Pandolphe has locked them up. The old man surprises them as Lysandre is declaring his love for Isabelle and vows he will never let them marry. But he finally yields to the pleas of Lysandre, Isabelle, Scapin and Nerine and gives his blessing to the wedding (Finale: Ah, mon cher oncle).

== Recording ==
- L'irato, Miljenko Turk (Scapin), Cyril Auvity (Lysandre), Pauline Courtin (Isabelle), Alain Buet (Pandolphe), Svenja Hempel (Nérine), Georg Poplutz (Balouard), Bonner Kammerchor, L'Arte del Mondo, conducted by Werner Ehrhardt (Capriccio, 2006)

== Sources ==
- Adélaïde de Place Étienne Nicolas Méhul (Bleu Nuit Éditeur, 2005)
- Booklet notes to the Capriccio recording by Michael Stegemann
- Elizabeth Bartlet, entry on Méhul in the New Grove Dictionary of Music and Musicians
- Hector Berlioz, Evenings with the Orchestra, translated by Jacques Barzun (University of Chicago Press, 1973; 1999 reprint)
