= Hiérodrame =

Type of musical work based on the Bible

Hiérodrame (from Greek ἱερὀς δρᾶμα, 'sacred drama') is a French musical work for two or more voices, with a plot drawn from the Bible. The term was generally used as a synonym for oratorio in France in the 1750s-1780s. Scored for soloists, chorus, and orchestra, the hiérodrame was similar to the grand motet in its structure of solo airs and choruses; however, the texts were taken from newly composed French poems, rather than Latin psalms.

French oratorios were performed at the Concert Spirituel, rather than in church. Works that were performed at the Concert Spirituel and described as hiérodrames include Le sacrifice d'Abraham (1780, words by Voltaire, music by Cambini); Samson (1783, words by Voltaire, music by Valentin), and Absalon (1786, words by Moline, music by Henri Montan Berton).
