= Charles-Joseph Loeillard d'Avrigny =

French poet and librettist (c. 1760–1823)

Charles-Joseph Loeillard d'Avrigny (c. 1760 in Martinique – 17 September 1823) was a French poet and librettist. He was married to the soprano Rose Renaud.

== Works ==
- 1790: Les Brouilleries, opéra comique, composed by Henri-Montan Berton
- 1793: Eugène ou la Piété filiale, opéra-comique, also composed by Henri-Montan Berton
- 1794: La Lettre, one-act comedy, in prose and vaudevilles, Paris, Libraire au Théâtre du vaudeville
- 1807: Le Départ de La Pérouse ou les Navigateurs modernes, poem, Paris, Léopold Collin
- 1812: Poésies nationales, Paris, Le Normant
- 1819: Jeanne d'Arc à Rouen, five-act tragady, in verse, Paris, Ladvocat
- 1846: Une expiation, four-act drama, mingled with song, Bruxelles, J.A. Lelong
- Tableau historique des commencements et des progrès de la puissance britannique dans les Indes.

== Sources ==
- Ferdinand Hoefer, Nouvelle biographie universelle, Paris, Didot, 1858, (p. 881).
- Jacques-Alphonse Mahul, Annuaire nécrologique, ou Supplément annuel et continuation de toutes les biographies ou dictionnaires historiques, 4e année, 1823, Paris : Ponthieu, 1824, (pp. 14-15) .
