= Louis-Barthélémy Pradher =

French composer, pianist and music educator

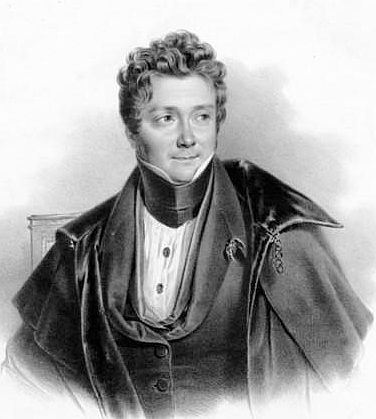
Louis-Barthélémy Pradher

Louis-Barthélémy Pradher (16 December 1782 – 19 October 1843) was a French composer, pianist and music educator.

== Life ==
Born in Paris, Pradher was the son of a violinist of the Prince de Condé. He received his first music lessons from his father and Louis Gobert at the École royale de musique. After the school was closed during the Revolution, he was a student of Hélène de Montgeroult. From 1797, he took lessons at the Conservatoire de Paris, piano with Gobert and harmony with Henri Montan Berton, until the completion of his training in 1798. He married the singer and pianist Elyse (Elisabeth-Charlotte) Philidor (1776–1819) in 1799. She was the daughter of the composer François-André Danican Philidor and the niece of the singer Louis-Augustin Richer.

In 1802, he took musical composition courses with Étienne-Nicolas Méhul and in 1802 took over the piano class of Louis Emmanuel Jadin at the Paris Conservatoire and, from 1803, he was full professor at the succession of François-Adrien Boieldieu. He remained in this position until his retirement in 1828. Among his students were François-Joseph Fétis, Charles-Laurent Rhein, as well as the Herz brothers, Jacques-Simom Herz and Henri Herz.

He was a member of King Louis XVIII's Court Orchestra and Chamber Music and King Charles X's Court pianist as well as Maître de musique des enfants du roi. In his second marriage, he married an opera singer, Félicité More and was made a Chevalier of the Légion d'honneur in 1826.

Pradher died at Gray at age 60.

== Works ==
Pradher composed several opéras-comiques, whose moderate success quickly declined due to the poor quality of the booklets. However, he has made a name for himself with his brilliant piano music that brought his virtuosity to light. Among these works, thirteen series of romances, numerous sonatas for piano and several concertos for piano and orchestra.

Operas

- Le Chevalier d'industrie, opera (composed with Gustave Dugazon, on a libretto by Jacques Bins de Saint-Victor), 1804
- La Folie musicale ou Le Chanteur prisonnier, opera on a libretto by Francis d’Allarde), 1807
- Trois romances mises en musique avec accompagnement de forte piano, 1810
- Jeune et vieille, opera on a libretto by René Allisan de Chazet, composed with Henri-Montan Berton), 1811
- L'Emprunt, secret ou Le Prêteur sans le vouloir, opera on a libretto by François Antoine Eugène de Planard), 1812
- Le Philosophe en voyage, opera on a libretto by Paul de Kock, composed with Charles-Frédéric Kreubé), 1821
- Jenny la bouquetière, opera on a libretto by Jean-Nicolas Bouilly and Joseph Pain, composed with Kreubé), 1823
