= Louis-Augustin Richer =

French classical singer, singing professor and composer

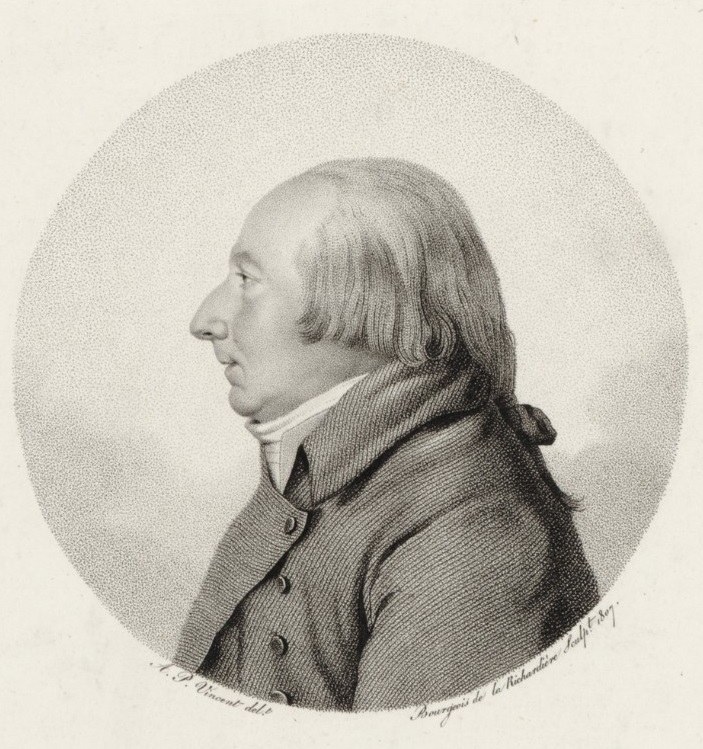
- Born: 26 July 1740; Versailles, France
- Died: 29 April 1819 (aged 78); Paris, France
- Other name: Auguste Richer
- Occupations: classical singer; singing professor; composer

Louis-Augustin Richer (26 July 1740 – 29 April 1819) was a French singer, singing professor and composer. He was a member of a family of musicians from Versailles who also had close ties to the family of André Danican Philidor. He gained prominence as a singer at the courts of Louis XV and Louis XVI and also served as Maître de musique (official music teacher) for the courts of the Duke of Chartres and the Duke of Bourbon. After the abolition of the monarchy during the French Revolution, Richer became a professor at the Paris Conservatory.

== Life and career ==
Louis-Augustin Richer was born in Versailles where both his parents, André François-Joseph Richer and Marie Élisabeth née Leroy, were singers in the service of Louis XV. André Richer (1712–1757) began his musical training under Delalande and Bernier when he was a page in the Musique du roi, the King's personal troupe of musicians. He was also a composer and later became Maître de musique for the courts of the Duke of Chartres and the Duke of Bourbon. André and Élisabeth had numerous children. Five of those who survived to adulthood also became musicians—Pierre-Joseph, Antoine, Louis-Augustin, Élisabeth, and Sylvestre.

The early career of Louis-Augustin, the most prominent of the six siblings, closely resembled that of his father. He was a page of the Musique du roi from 1748 to 1756 and made his debut as a singer at the Concert Spirituel in 1752 at the age of 11. On the death of his father Andre in 1757, Richer succeeded him as maître de musique to the dukes of Chartres and Bourbon. Richer was admired for the beauty of his voice and the tastefulness of his singing, first as a boy soprano and later as a tenor. In 1776 he was the dedicatee of Marc-Antoine Désaugiers's L'Art du chant figuré (his translation of Mancini's treatise on singing). (Note: The original Italian title of Mancini's work was Pensieri e riflessioni pratiche sopra il canto figurato. The term "canto figurato" (or "chant figuré" in French) refers to florid, ornamented singing.)

Richer was also a frequent singer in Marie Antoinette's private concerts in the Petit Trianon. In 1780 he was appointed as the future maître de musique to the children of Louis XVI and Marie Antoinette, a role which he assumed on the death of his predecessor Pierre de La Garde in the midst of the French Revolution. The role proved to be short-lived. Richer's career at the court ended with the arrest of Louis XVI on 13 August 1792 and the official abolition of the monarchy a month later. Deprived not only of his employment but also of his pensions for service to Louis XV, Louis XVI, and the dukes of Chartres and Bourbon, he became a professor of singing at the newly-established Paris Conservatory. Alexandre Choron described him in 1811 as both a charming man and good musician and living in Paris surrounded by his family and friends.

During his time at the court of Louis XVI in the 1780s Richer had been a member of the Masonic organization Grand Orient de France and was an associate of the Concert de la Loge Olympique, a concert society and orchestra which had been founded by a group of Parisian Masons. He was also a member of the Société académique des enfants d'Apollon and served as its president from 1807 to 1808. As a composer, he published three collections of vocal pieces—romances, chansonettes, and cantailles. (Note: A chansonette (the diminutive of chanson) is a short humorous or anecdotal song. The cantaille was a shortened form of the cantata and generally devoted to light, charming subjects. The genre was particularly popular in the 18th century.)

Richer died in Paris in 1819 at the age of 78.

== Richer's siblings ==
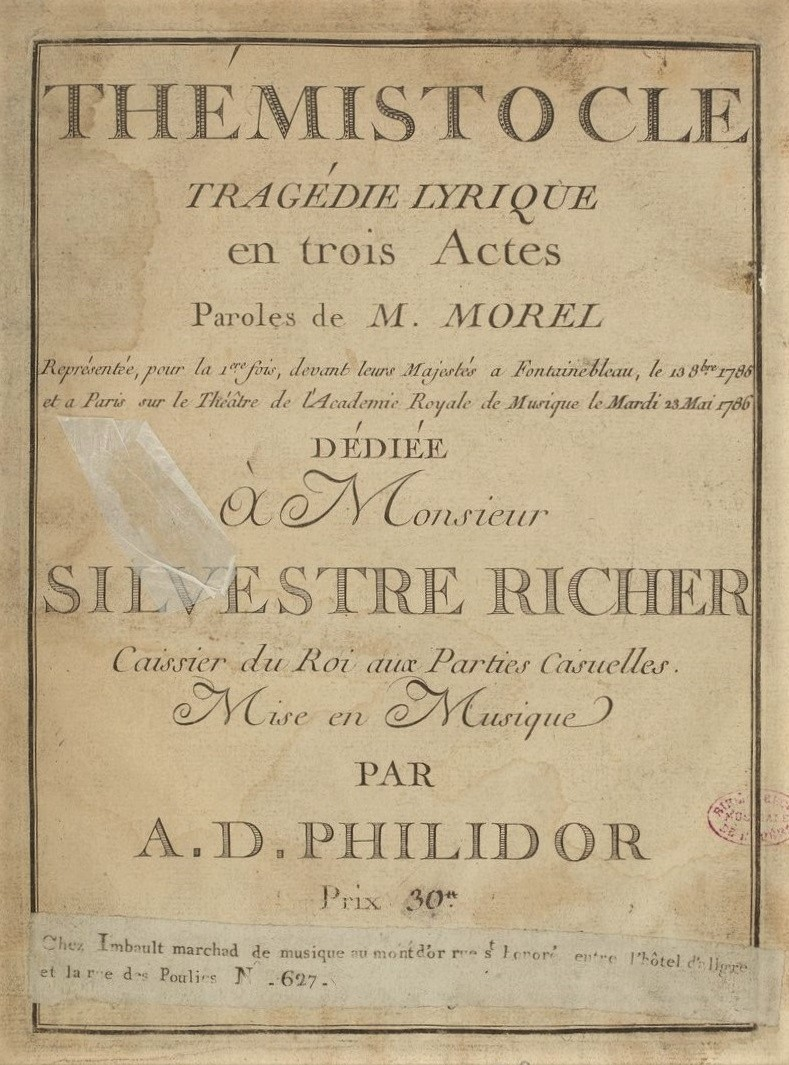
Title page of Philidor's score for Thémistocle dedicated to Sylvestre Richer

Richer and his siblings had close family ties with the composer André Danican Philidor. Their mother was a first cousin of Philador, and one of the siblings, Élisabeth, became Philidor's wife in 1760. As Philidor could neither play an instrument nor sing, Élisabeth and her brothers would sometimes rehearse his compositions for him so he could hear what they sounded like.

The youngest of the siblings was Philémon-Pierre Richer (1747–after 1795). Little is known about his life, although he is mentioned in a letter written by Philidor on 21 March 1788 concerning the delivery of a piano for Louis Adam. Richer's siblings who became musicians were:

- Pierre-Joseph Richer (1737–1760), a violinist who entered into the service of Philip, Duke of Parma in 1756. Ill health forced him to return to Paris in 1759. He died in Switzerland of tuberculosis at the age of 22.
- Antoine Richer (François-Antoine) (1739–1818), a violinist who entered into the service of the Duke of Parma in 1758 and rose to the position of the duke's maître de chapelle. While in Parma he married Jeanne-Michelle Bouvier (1760–1841), the elder sister of the violinist and composer Marie-Joseph Bouvier who had been one of Antoine's students. Marie-Joseph was later admitted to the orchestra of the Comédie-Italienne on the recommendation of Philidor. In the mid-1790s, Antoine and Jeanne-Michelle settled in Montlandon where they rented a house belonging to Philidor's eldest son, André-Joseph-Heleine-Danican.
- Élisabeth Richer (Angélique-Henriette-Élisabeth) (1741–1809), a singer and harpsichordist who performed at the Concert Spirituel. She married Philidor on 13 February 1760 at the Église Saint-Sulpice in Paris. The couple had six children, five sons and a daughter. Their daughter, Élisabeth (known as "Élyse"), was a singer and pianist and the only one of the Philidor children to become a musician. In 1799 she married the composer Louis-Barthélémy Pradher, who was ten years her junior.
- Sylvestre Richer (Charles-Sylvestre) (1743–after 1809), a singer and cellist in the service of Louis XVI. He later became an official in the Royal Treasury and eased the way for Philidor's son Louis-Victoire to obtain a position there. He was the dedicatee of the score for Philidor's opera Thémistocle which was published in 1786.
