= Benoît-Joseph Marsollier =

French playwright and librettist (1750–1817)

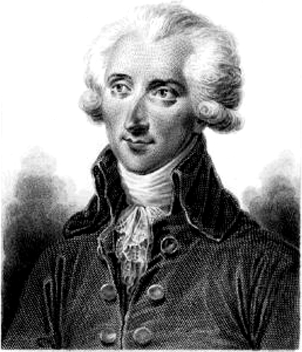
- Born: 1750; Paris, France
- Died: 22 April 1817 (aged 66–67); Versailles, Paris, France
- Occupations: Speleologist, playwright, librettist, writer

Benoît-Joseph Marsollier (also known as Benoît-Joseph Marsollier des Vivetières, (Paris, 1750 – Versailles, 22 April 1817) was a French playwright and librettist. He is particularly noted for his work in opéra comique. In 1780 he also led the first exploration of the Grotte des Demoiselles.

His librettos include Nina, L'irato, and Les deux petits savoyards.

== List of plays ==
- Le Danger de la prévention, comedy in 3 acts and in prose, created at the Comédie-Italienne (hôtel de Bourgogne) 28 May 1761
- Jenni, ou le Désintéressement, drame de société in 2 acts and in prose (Nancy, J. B. Hyacinthe, 1771) Read online
- Le Connoisseur, comédie de société, in 3 acts and in prose, by {M. le Chevalier D. G. N. auteur du drame de Jenni, (Paris, Valade, 1771) Read online (Note: Le Connoisseur: a revival wrongly seen as a creation even by Mme la comtesse Hauptoul took place at the théâtre de Mlle Montansier 13 July 1791. The play was printed by another publisher, (Paris, Brunet, 1793).)
- Norac et Javolci, drama in 3 acts and in prose created in 1771 at the Hôtel de Conti in Versailles (Lyon, 1785) Read online
- Le Parti sage, proverbe dramatique in 1 act and in prose created at The Hague 29 June 1771 (London, 1785)
- Richard et Sara (Paris, Valade, 1772)
- Le Trompeur, trompé, ou À bon chat, bon rat, comédie de société in 1 act and in prose created in Paris in 1772 (Paris, Valade, 1772)
- Le Bal masqué, opéra comique in 1 act, music by François-Joseph Darcis, created at the château de Versailles 31 March 1772 (Paris, Vente, 1772) Read online
- Georges et Molly, drama in 3 acts and in prose mingled with ariettes, from L’Orpheline anglaise created at the Hôtel de Bourgogne 17 September 1772 (Paris, Valade, 1774)
- La Fausse Peur, comedy in 1 act and in prose mingled with ariettes, music by François-Joseph Darcis, created at the Hôtel de Bourgogne 18 July 1774 (Paris, Valade, 1774) Read online
- La Fausse Délicatesse, comedy in 3 acts and in prose mingled with ariettes, music by Philipp Joseph Hinner, (Note: Père de Laure de Berny, Honoré de Balzac's mistress. Cf. maj Commune de Versailles (May 1777), Archives départementales des Yvelines (ed.), Registres paroissiaux et d'état civil. Commune Versailles. Paroisse Saint-Louis: Collection départementale. Cote 1112628, vol. Actes B. Dates 1777-1777, Versailles, folio 36 (vue 42 gauche).) créée au château de Fontainebleau le 18 octobre 1776 (Paris, Duchesne, 1776)
- Le Vieillard crédule, proverbe in 1 act and in prose, created at the Théâtre des Petits-Comédiens in the bois de Boulogne 14 August 1779
- Beaumarchais à Madrid, comedy in 3 acts and in prose, created in Lyon in 1780 Read online
- L’Officieux, comedy in 3 acts and in prose in collaboration with Adrien-Nicolas Piédefer, marquis de La Salle, created at the Hôtel de Bourgogne 18 August 1780 (Paris, Pierre Didot, 1780)
- Le Vaporeux, comedy in 2 acts and in prose, created at the Hôtel de Bourgogne 3 May 1782 (Paris, Brunet, 1782)
- Les Deux Aveugles de Bagdad, comedy in 2 acts and in prose mingled with ariettes, created at the Hôtel de Bourgogne 9 September 1782
- Philips et Sara, little play in 1 act and in verse created at the Théâtre de l'Ambigu-Comique 16 January 1783 (Paris, Delavigne, 1783)
- Céphise, ou L’Erreur de l’esprit, comedy in 2 acts and in prose created at the Opéra-Comique (salle Favart) 28 January 1783 (Paris, Barba, 1797)
- La Confiance trahie, comedy in 1 act and in prose, in collaboration with Arthur Murphy, created in Lyon 28 February 1784 (Paris, Brunet, 1784)
- Les Billets nuls, ou les Deux Billets, comedy in 1 act and in prose, created at the Théâtre des Variétés-Amusantes 17 May 1784
- L'entente est au diseur, « proverbe » in 1 act and in prose, created at the Ambigu-Comique December 1784
- Théodore ou le Bonheur inattendu, comedy in 3 acts and in prose mingled with ariettes, created at the château de Fontainebleau 4 March 1785
- Blaise et Babet, comedy in prose, created in Lyon in 1785
- Nina ou la Folle par amour, comedy in 1 act in prose mingled with ariettes, music by Nicolas Dalayrac, created in the salle Favart 15 May 1786 (Paris, Brunet, 1786) (Note: L'ouvrage connu plusieurs éditions à Paris et province : Paris, Brunet, 1786 BnF 30891471g; Londres, T. Hookham, 1786 BnF 30891472t; Toulouse, Broulhiet, 1786 BnF 386580323; Paris, Delalain, 1787 BnF 38658033f; Paris, Brunet, 1789 BnF 38658034s; Paris, Peytieux, 1789 - Read online; Avignon, A. Berenguier, 1794 BnF 386580354)Read online
- Les deux petits savoyards, comedy in 1 act mingled with ariettes, music by Nicolas Dalayrac, created salle Favart 14 January 1789 (Paris, Brunet, 1789)
- Camille, ou le Souterrain, drame lyrique in 3 acts and in prose, music by Nicolas Dalayrac, created salle Favart 19 March 1791 (Paris, Brunet, 1791) Read online
- Le Chevalier de la Barre, comedy in 1 act and in prose, created salle Favart 6 July 1791
- Asgill ou le Prisonnier de guerre, drama in 1 act and in prose, music by Nicolas Dalayrac, Paris, salle Favart, created 13 floréal an I|2 May 1793
- Les Détenus, ou, Cange, commissionnaire de Lazare, "historical fact" in 1 act and in prose mingled with ariettes, music by Nicolas Dalayrac, created salle Favart 28 brumaire an III (18 November 1794) (Paris, Maradan, 1794) Read online
- Arnill, ou le Prisonnier américain, (same work as 'Asgill but change of title when revived) comedy in 1 act and in prose, music by Nicolas Dalayrac, created salle Favart 19 ventôse an III (9 March 1795 (Paris, Barba, 1797) Read online
- La Pauvre Femme, comedy in 1 act and in prose mingled with ariettes, music by Nicolas Dalayrac, created salle Favart 19 germinal an III (8 April 1795) (Paris, Barba, 1796) Read online
- Adèle et Dorsan, drame lyrique in 3 acts and in prose, mingled with ariettes, music by Nicolas Dalayrac, created salle Favart 8 floréal an III (27 April 1795) (Paris, Libraire du Théâtre de l’Opéra-Comique, 1796)
- Marianne, ou l'Amour maternel, comedy in 1 act and in prose mingled with ariettes, music by Nicolas Dalayrac, created salle Favart 19 messidor an IV (7 July 1796) (Paris, Chaigneau, 1796)
- La Maison isolée, ou le Vieillard des Vosges, "historical fact" in 2 acts and in prose mingled with ariettes, music by Nicolas Dalayrac, created salle Favart 22 floréal an V (11 May 1797) (Paris, Barba, 1797) Read online
- La Leçon, ou la Tasse de glace, comedy in 1 act and in prose mingled with ariettes, music by Nicolas Dalayrac, created at the Théâtre Feydeau 5 prairial an V (24 May 1797 (Paris, Huet, 1797)
- Le Traité nul, comedy in 1 act and in prose mingled with ariettes, music by Pierre Gaveaux created at the Théâtre Feydeau 5 messidor an V/23 June 1797 (Paris, Huet, 1797) Read online
- Gulnare, ou l’Esclave persane, comedy in 1 act and in prose mingled with ariettes, music by Nicolas Dalayrac, created salle Favart 10 nivôse an VI (30 december 1797) (Paris, Barba, 1798)
- Alexis ou l'Erreur d’un bon père, comedy in 1 act and in prose mingled with ariettes, music by Nicolas Dalayrac, created at the Théâtre Feydeau 5 pluviôse an VI (24 January 1798) (Paris, Barba, 1798) Read online
- La Mort du colonel Mauduit, ou les Anarchistes au Port-au-Prince, "historical fact" in 1 act and in prose (Paris, Cailleau, 1799)
- Adolphe et Clara, ou les Deux Prisonniers, comedy in 1 act and in prose mingled with ariettes, music by Nicolas Dalayrac, created salle Favart 22 pluviôse an VII (10 February 1799) (Paris, Au bureau-général du Mercure de France, chez Cailleau, imprimeur-libraire, 1799) Read online
- Roger ou le Page, comedy in 3 acts and in prose, in collaboration with Edmond de Favières, music bye Nicolas Dalayrac, created salle Favart 20 ventôse an VII (10 March 1799)
- Laure ou l'Actrice chez elle, comedy in 1 act, music by Nicolas Dalayrac, created salle Favart 3 vendémiaire an VIII (27 September 1799)
- Emma, ou le Soupçon, opera in 3 acts, created at the Théâtre Feydeau 15 October 1799
- Le Rocher de Leucade, comedy in 1 act and in prose mingled with ariettes, music by Nicolas Dalayrac, created 25 pluviôse an VIII (14 February 1800) at the Opéra-Comique (salle Favart)
- Une matinée de Catinat, ou le Tableau, opéra in 1 act and in prose, music by Nicolas Dalayrac, createdat the Opéra-Comique (théâtre Feydeau) 7 vendémiaire an IX (29 September 1800) (Paris, André, 1801)
- Le Joueur d’échecs, vaudeville in 1 act created at the Théâtre Montansier 13 vendémiaire an IX/5 October 1800 (Paris, Madame Masson, 1801)
- L’Irato, ou l’Emporté, comédie-parade in 1 act mingled with ariettes, music by Étienne-Nicolas Méhul, created salle Favart 29 pluviôse an IX/18 February 1801 (Paris, Masson, 1801)
- Léhéman, ou la Tour de Newstadt, drame lyrique in 3 acts and in prose, music by Nicolas Dalayrac, created Théâtre Feydeau 21 frimaire an X (12 December 1801) (Paris, Masson, 1801)
- Le Concert interrompu, opéra comique in 1 act in collaboration with Edmond de Favières, music by Henri-Montan Berton, created at Théâtre Feydeau 31 May 1802 (Paris, Masson, 1802)
- Joanna, opéra comique in 2 acts, music by Étienne-Nicolas Méhul, created Théâtre Feydeau 2 frimaire an XI/23 November 1802 (Paris, Masson, 1803)
- Léonce, ou le Fils adoptif, opéra comique in 2 acts and in prose mingled with music, music by Nicolas Isouard created Théâtre Feydeau 18 November 1805
- Les Deux Aveugles de Tolède, opéra comique in 1 act and in prose, (Note: Issu des Deux aveugles de Bagdad (1782) Cf. maj Wild & Charlton 2005, pp. 214–215.) music by Étienne-Nicolas Méhul, created at the Théâtre Feydeau 28 January 1806 (Paris, Masson, 1806)
- Deux mots, ou Une nuit dans la forêt, comedy in 1 act and in prose, music by Nicolas Dalayrac, created at the Théâtre Feydeau 9 June 1806 (Paris, Masson, 1806) Read online
- Jean de Paris, melodrama extravaganza in 3 acts and in prose, created at the Théâtre de la Porte-Saint-Martin 26 February 1807 (Paris, Barba, 1807)
- Élise-Hortense, ou les Souvenirs de l’enfance, comedy in 1 act mingled with ariettes, music by Nicolas Dalayrac, created at the Théâtre Feydeau 26 September 1809 (Paris, Masson, 1809)
- Edmond et Caroline, ou la Lettre et la Réponse, comedy in 1 act and in prose mingled with ariettes, music by Frédéric Kreubé, created at the Théâtre Feydeau 5 August 1819 (Paris, J.-N. Barba, 1819)

== Bibliography ==
- Wild, Nicole; Charlton, David (2005). Théâtre de l'Opéra-Comique. Paris: Répertoire 1762–1972 (in French). Sprimont: Mardaga. ISBN 2-87009-898-7.
