= Henri François Berton =

French composer (1784–1832)

Henri Berton
- Born: Henri François Berton; 3 May 1784; Paris, Kingdom of France
- Died: 19 July 1832 (aged 48); Paris, France
- Occupation: Composer
- Father: Henri-Montan Berton
- Relatives: Pierre Montan Berton (grandfather)

Henri François Berton called Berton fils (3 May 1784, in Paris – 19 July 1832, in Paris) was an early 19th-century French composer.

Pierre Montan Berton was his grandfather and Henri-Montan Berton was his father. He died of cholera.

== Selected works ==
- 1810: Le Présent de noces, ou le Pari, one-act opéra comique, music by Henri François Berton, Théâtre Feydeau, 2 January
- 1811: Ninette à la cour, opéra comique in 2 acts and in verse, after Charles-Simon Favart, music by Henri Montan Berton, Opéra-Comique, 24 December
- 1834: Le Château d'Urtuby, one-act opéra comique, libretto by Gabriel de Lurieu and Raoul, created on a posthumous music 14 January at the Théâtre royal de l'Opéra-Comique.
