= Hellé =

Hellé (Helle) is an opera by the French composer Étienne-Joseph Floquet, first performed at the Académie Royale de Musique (the Paris Opéra) on 5 January 1779. It takes the form of a tragédie lyrique in three acts. The libretto, by Pierre Lemonnier, is based on the Greek myth of Helle. At this time, there was little demand for operas by native French composers (Parisian audiences preferred works by the German Christoph Willibald Gluck or the Italian Niccolò Piccinni) and Floquet struggled to have Hellé staged. When it eventually appeared in 1779, it was booed, despite Floquet's attempt to imitate the style of Piccinni, and ran for only three performances.

== Roles ==
Role	Voice type	Premiere cast
Hellé	soprano	Marie-Joséphine Laguerre
Ino	soprano	Françoise-Claude-Marie-Rosalie Campagne (called Mlle Duplant)
Ismène	soprano	Mlle Châteauvieux
Neptune	haute-contre	Joseph Legros
Elphingor		

== Synopsis ==
Hellé is a princess of Colchis. Her father Athamas has died and left her to the care of his sister Ino, Queen of Thebes. The god Neptune is in love with Hellé and has been wooing her disguised as a mortal called Arsame. However, Ino is also in love with Arsame and resorts to a magician, Elphingor, to stop the wedding of Hellé and Arsame. Elphingor conjures a vision which persuades Hellé that her beloved has been unfaithful to her and she flees from the court. Elphingor also helps Ino by producing a storm which wrecks the ship in which Hellé is travelling. Neptune is angry that a storm has been raised without his permission. He seeks the culprit, finds it is Ino and when he reveals his true identity to her, she kills herself in despair. Neptune brings Hellé to his underwater palace and makes her ruler of the sea in which her ship sank, giving it the region the name Hellespont after her.

== Sources ==
- (in French) Félix Clément and Pierre Larousse Dictionnaire des Opéras, p. 339.
- (in French) Louis Petit de Bachaumont, Mémoires secrets pour servir à l'histoire de la république des lettres en France, 1780.
- Benoît Dratwicki, "Foreigners at the Académie Royale de Musique" in Antonio Sacchini, Renaud, Madrid, Ediciones Singulares, 2013 (book accompanying the complete recording conducted by Christophe Rousset). ISBN 978-84-939-6865-6
- Spire Pitou, The Paris Opéra. An Encyclopedia of Operas, Ballets, Composers, and Performers – Rococo and Romantic, 1715–1815, Westport/London, Greenwood Press, 1985. ISBN 0-313-24394-8
- Julian Rushton, article "Floquet, Étienne-Joseph" in The New Grove Dictionary of Music and Musicians
