= Les deux petits savoyards =

Composer Nicolas Dalayrac

Les deux petits savoyards (The Two Little Savoyards) is a comic opera in one act by the French composer Nicolas Dalayrac. It was first performed by the Comédie-Italienne at the first Salle Favart in Paris on 14 January 1789. The libretto is by Benoît-Joseph Marsollier des Vivetières. The opera was a great success; according to the records of the Comédie-Italienne, 104,000 spectators had seen it by 1793. The theme of reconciliation between the social classes appealed to audiences at the beginning of the French Revolution. Les deux petits savoyards received its British premiere at Sadler's Wells in June 1789 and it first appeared in the United States in Philadelphia in 1797.

== Roles ==
Roles, voice types, premiere cast
Cast	Voice type	Premiere cast, 14 January 1789
Michel, a Savoyard boy	soprano	Jeanne-Charlotte Schroeder ("Madame Saint-Aubin")
Joset, his brother	soprano	Rose Renaud
Verseuil	tenor	Jean-Pierre Solié
Bailli	baritone	

== Synopsis ==
The two little Savoyard boys of the title (played by female sopranos) make a living by exhibiting their pet marmot at country fairs. When they arrive at a fair near Lyons they catch the attention of the local landowner, Verseuil. Verseuil has spent much of his life making money in America but has returned to France in search of his brother. The two Savoyards happen to have a locket with a portrait of the brother who, it turns out, was their father. The delighted Verseuil decides to share his fortune with the boys and their mother.
