= Jean Michel Constant Leber =

French historian (1780–1859)

Jean Michel Constant Leber (8 May 1780 – 22 December 1859) was a French historian and bibliophile.

== Biography ==
Leber was born at Orléans on 8 May 1780. His first work was a poem on Joan of Arc (1804); but he wrote at the same time a Grammaire général synthétique, which attracted the attention of J. M. de Gérando, then secretary-general to the ministry of the interior. The latter found him a minor post in his department, which left him leisure for his historical work. He even took him to Italy when Napoleon was trying to organize, after French models, the Roman states which he had taken from the Pope in 1809. Leber however did not stay there long, for he considered the attacks on the temporal property of the Holy See to be sacrilegious.

On his return to Paris Leber resumed his administrative work, literary recreations and historical researches. While spending a part of his time writing vaudevilles and comic operas, he began to collect old essays and rare pamphlets by old French historians. His office was preserved to him by the Restoration, and Leber put his literary gifts at the service of the government. When the question of the coronation of Louis XVIII arose, he wrote, as an answer to Volney, a minute treatise on the Cérémonies du sacre, which was published at the time of the Coronation of Charles X of France.

Towards the end of Joseph de Villèle's ministry, when there was a movement of public opinion in favour of extending municipal liberties, Leber undertook the defence of the threatened system of centralization, and composed, in answer to François Raynouard, an Histoire critique du pouvoir municipal depuis l'origine de la monarchie jusqu'à nos jours (1828). He also wrote a treatise entitled De l'état réel de la presse et des pamphlets depuis François I^{er} jusqu'à Louis XIV (1834), in which be refuted an empty paradox of Charles Nodier, who had tried to prove that the press had never been, and could never be, so free as under the Grand Monarch.

A few years later, Leber retired (1839), and sold to the library of Rouen the rich collection of books which he had amassed during thirty years of research. The catalogue he made himself (4 vols., 1839 to 1852). In 1840 he read at the Academie des Inscriptions et Belles-Lettres two dissertations, an "Essai sur l'appreciation de la fortune privée au moyen âge", followed, by an "Examen critique des tables de prix du marc d'argent depuis l'époque de Saint Louis"; these essays were included by the academy in its Recueil de mémoires présentés par divers savants (vol. i., 1844), and were also revised and published by Leber (1847). They form his most considerable work, and assure him a position of eminence in the economic history of France. He also rendered good service to historians by the publication of his Collection des meilleures dissertations, notices et traités relatifs à l'histoire de France (20 vols., 1826–1840); in the absence of an index, since Leber did not leave one, an analytical table of contents is to be found in Alfred Franklin's Sources de l'histoire de France (1876, pp. 342 sqq.). In consequence of the revolution of 1848, Leber decided to leave Paris. He retired to his native town, and spent his last years in collecting old engravings. He died at Orléans on 22 December 1859.

In 1832 Leber had been elected as a member of the Societé des Antiquaires de France, and in the Bulletin of this society (vol. i., 1860) is to be found the most correct and detailed account of his life's works.
