= Pierre de La Garde =

French composer and baritone

Pierre de La Garde (10 February 1717, Crécy-la-Chapelle – c.1792) was a French composer and baritone. He was music master to the daughters of Louis XV. His surviving compositions are mainly lightweight, composed for himself to sing and accompany himself on the guitar. His opéra-ballet Aeglé (1748), of which a copy survives in the Musée de l'Amérique française, has been revived in Canada, and his comic cantata La Sonate, commencing "N’admirés vous pas ce tableau...," was recorded by Dominique Visse.
