= Saint-Bauzille-de-Putois =

- Commune
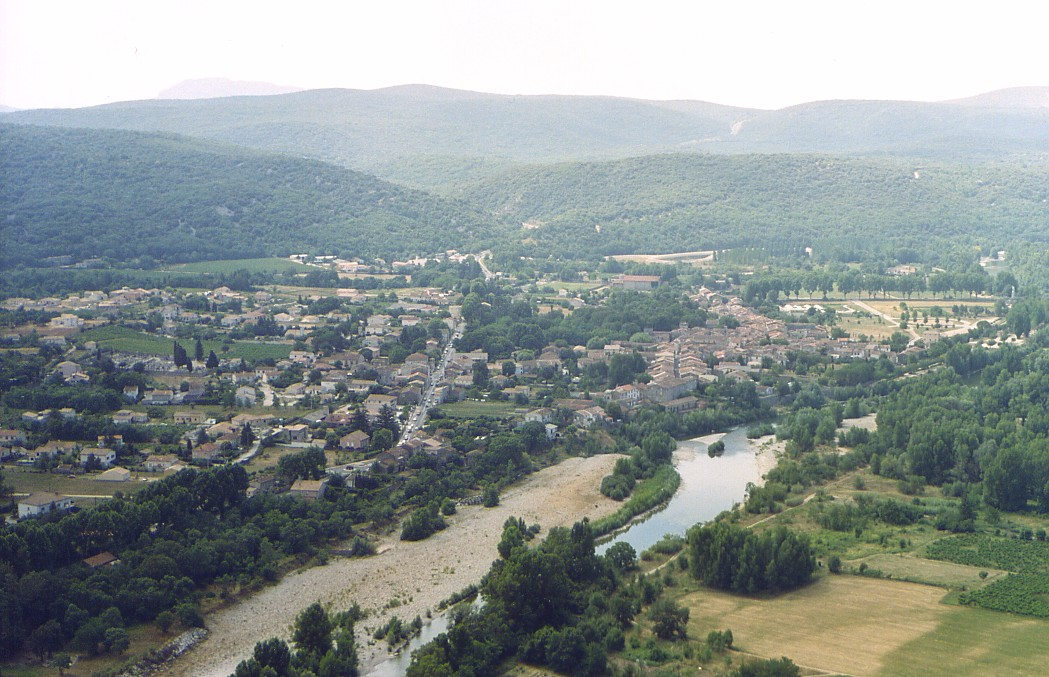
- An aerial view of Saint-Bauzille-de-Putois

- Coat of arms
- Location of Saint-Bauzille-de-Putois
- Location within France Location within Occitanie
- Coordinates: 43°53′46″N 3°44′13″E
- Country: France
- Region: Occitania
- Department: Hérault
- Arrondissement: Lodève
- Canton: Lodève
- Intercommunality: Cévennes Gangeoises et Suménoises

Government
  - Mayor (2020–2026): Oscar Alle
- Area^{1}: 18.16 km^{2} (7.01 sq mi)
- Elevation: 137 m (449 ft)
- Highest elevation: 483 m (1,585 ft)
- Lowest elevation: 118 m (387 ft)
- Population (2023): 1,766
  - Density: 97.25/km^{2} (251.9/sq mi)
- Time zone: UTC+01:00 (CET)
  - Summer (DST): UTC+02:00 (CEST)
- INSEE/Postal code: 34243 /34190
- ^{1} French Land Register data, which excludes lakes, ponds, glaciers > 1 km^{2} (0.386 sq mi or 247 acres) and river estuaries.

Saint-Bauzille-de-Putois (French pronunciation: [sɛ̃ bozil də pytwa]; Occitan: Sent Bausèli de Fouine) is a commune in the Hérault department in the Occitanie region in southern France.

== Population ==
Historical population
| Year | Pop. | ±% p.a. |
|---|---|---|
| 1968 | 1,341 | — |
| 1975 | 1,186 | −1.74% |
| 1982 | 1,108 | −0.97% |
| 1990 | 1,021 | −1.02% |
| 1999 | 1,140 | +1.23% |
| 2007 | 1,385 | +2.46% |
| 2012 | 1,809 | +5.49% |
| 2017 | 1,977 | +1.79% |
| 2023 | 1,766 | −1.86% |
Source: INSEE

== See also ==
- Communes of the Hérault department
