= Nicolas Dezède =

French composer

Nicolas-Alexandre Dezède (c.1740 in Lyon – 11 September 1798, in Paris) was an 18th-century French composer born from unknown parents.

Dezède presented a great many opéras comiques, of which several were popular, at the Théâtre italien de Paris. He served the Duke des Deux-Ponts from 1749 to 1790. A freemason, he was initiated at the lodge Les Neuf Sœurs in Paris. Mozart and Beethoven both wrote variations on themes by Dezède.

His daughter Florine Dezède composed the opera Lucette et Lucas.

== Main operas ==
- 1772: Julie (28 September);
- 1777: Les Trois Fermiers;
- 1783: Blaise et Babet;
- 1784: Le Véritable Figaro;
- 1785: Alexis et Justine.

== Bibliography ==
Alessandro Di Profio, Dezède (Familie), MGG (Die Musik in Geschichte und Gegenwart), new edition : Kassel, Bärenreiter, 1997, éd. Ludwig Finscher, vol. 5, coll. 961–963
