= Nicolas Dalayrac =

18th and 19th-century French composer

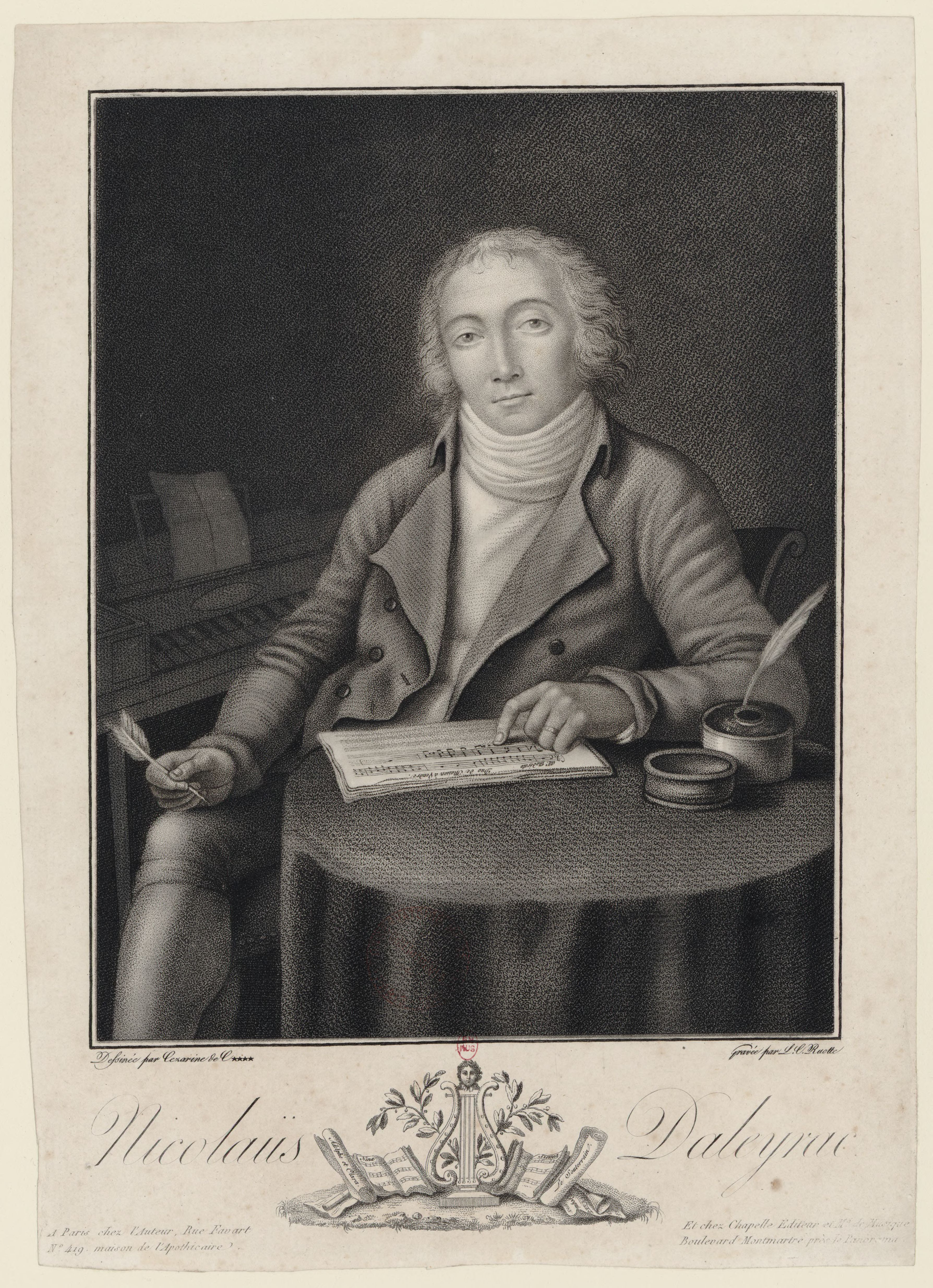
- Nicolas Dalayrac: lithography (Note: Ruotte 1801. This black and white lithograph represents Nicolas Dalayrac without Legion of Honor. There are copies, colored or not, anachronistic overloaded with the port of the Legion of Honor (received only in 1804). It is dated 1801 according to the work that Dalayrac writes as he poses: [Duo of] House for Sale (1800). — Drawn by Césarine de C. engraved by L. C. Ruotte (1801).)
- Born: 8 June 1753; Muret
- Died: 27 November 1809 (aged 56); Paris
- Occupation: Composer
- Era: Classical opera
- Known for: opéras-comiques
- Works: List of works
- Awards: 1824: Légion d'Honneur

Signature
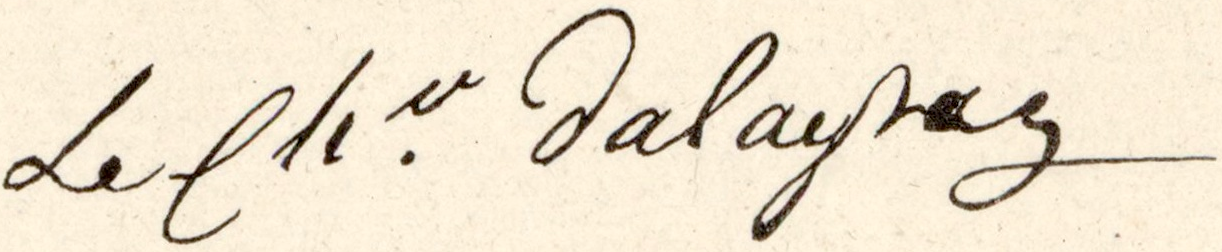

Nicolas-Marie d'Alayrac (French: [nikola mari dalerak]; bapt. 13 June 1753 – 26 November 1809), nicknamed the Musician poet, more commonly Nicolas Dalayrac, was a French composer of the Classical period. Intended for a military career, he made the acquaintance of many musicians in the Parisian salons, which convinced him of his true vocation.

Among his most popular works, Nina, or The Woman Crazed with Love (1786), which tackles the theme of madness and arouses real enthusiasm during its creation, premiered on 23 November at the Stroganov Palace. The Two Little Savoyards (1789), which deals with the rapprochement of social classes, a theme bearing the ideals of the French Revolution, Camille ou le Souterrain (1791), judged as his best production or even Léon ou le Château de Monténéro (1798) who by his leitmotifs announces a new genre.

His first compositions were violin duos, string trios and quartets. He published them under a pseudonym with Italian consonance. The quartets were very successful, and the true identity of their author was eventually discovered. According to René-Charles Guilbert de Pixérécourt, he was initiated into Freemasonry and was a member of the Masonic lodge of «The Nine Sisters». In 1778 he composed the music for the reception of Voltaire, and of the party in honor of Benjamin Franklin at the home of Anne-Catherine de Ligniville Helvétius. Dalayrac actively participated in the development of copyright.

== Biography ==
=== Childhood and youth ===
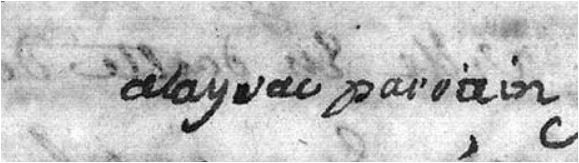
« Alayrac parrain », signature of the future composer, eight years old (Note: Alayrac is the name of his grandfather and father according to the latter's marriage certificate. Ce père est dénommé pour la seule fois par le curé sur l'acte de baptême de son fils Nicolas, mais il signe et fera de même pour ses quatre autres enfants (à noter que des particules sont apposées par d'autres signataires).(Parish of Taur 1761, p. 222) Le musicien lui-même, parrain d'une de ses sœurs, Blaize, signe (Muret 1761, p. 212))

Nicolas-Marie d'Alayrac was born in Muret on 8 April 1753, into a noble family of Sir Jean d'Alayrac, adviser to the king in the election of Comminges and his wife Marie Cluzel. Baptised five days later, Nicolas Alayrac is the oldest of five children. He was the first of four children, including two sisters who died at a young age, he was sent to the bar, and went to study in Toulouse.

Although he trained as a lawyer, he was encouraged by his father to abandon his career and follow his passion for music. He married the actress Gilberte Pétronille Sallarde. After the French Revolution he changed his name from the aristocratic d'Alayrac to Dalayrac. In 1804, he received the Légion d'honneur. He died in Paris, aged 56.

== Opéras-comiques ==
=== 1780–1789 ===
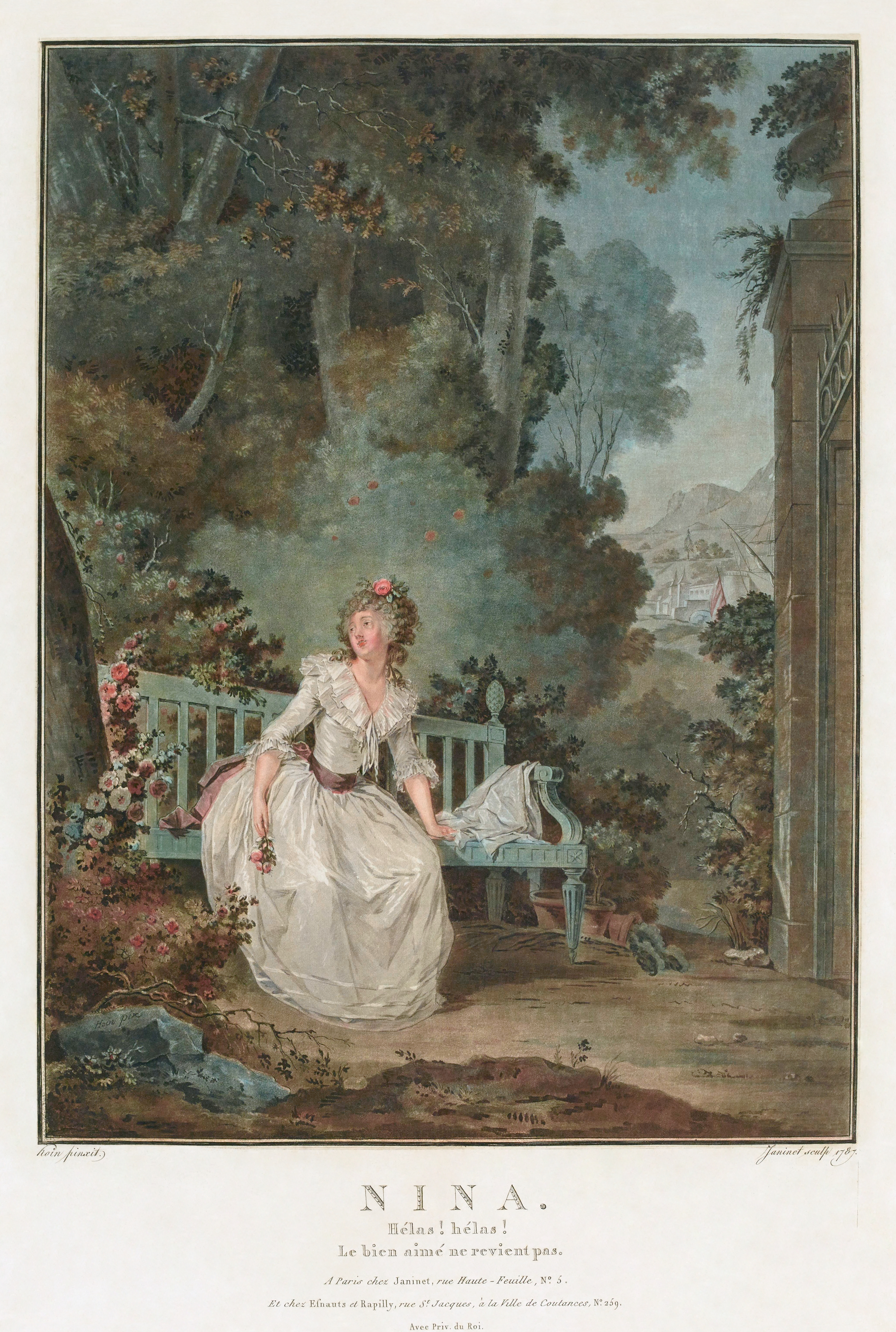
Madame Dugazon in the original production of Nina

- Le chevalier à la mode (1781)
- Le petit souper (1781)
- L'éclipse totale (1782)
- L'amant statue (1785)
- La dot (1785)
- Nina, ou La folle par amour (1786)
- Azémia (2 parties, 1786)
- Renaud d'Ast (1787)
- Sargines (1788)
- Fanchette (1788)
- Les deux petits Savoyards (1789), libretto by Benoît-Joseph Marsollier des Vivetières, first performance by Les Comédiens ordinaires du Roi, 14 January 1789.
- Raoul, sire de Créqui (1789)

=== 1790–1799 ===
- La soirée orageuse (1790)
- Le chêne patriotique (1790)
- Vert-Vert (1790)
- Camille ou Le souterrain (1791)
- Agnès et Olivier (1791)
- Philippe et Georgette (1791)
- Tout pour l'amour (1792)
- Ambroise (1793)
- Asgill (2 parties, 1793)
- La prise de Toulon (1794)
- Le congrès des rois (1794)
- L'enfance de Jean-Jacques Rousseau (1794)
- Les détenus (1794)
- Adèle et Dorsan (1795)
- Marianne (1796)
- La maison isolée (1797)
- La leçon (1797)
- Gulnare (1797)
- Alexis (1798)
- Léon (1798)
- Primerose (1798)
- Adolphe et Clara, ou Les deux prisonniers (1799)

=== 1800–1809 ===
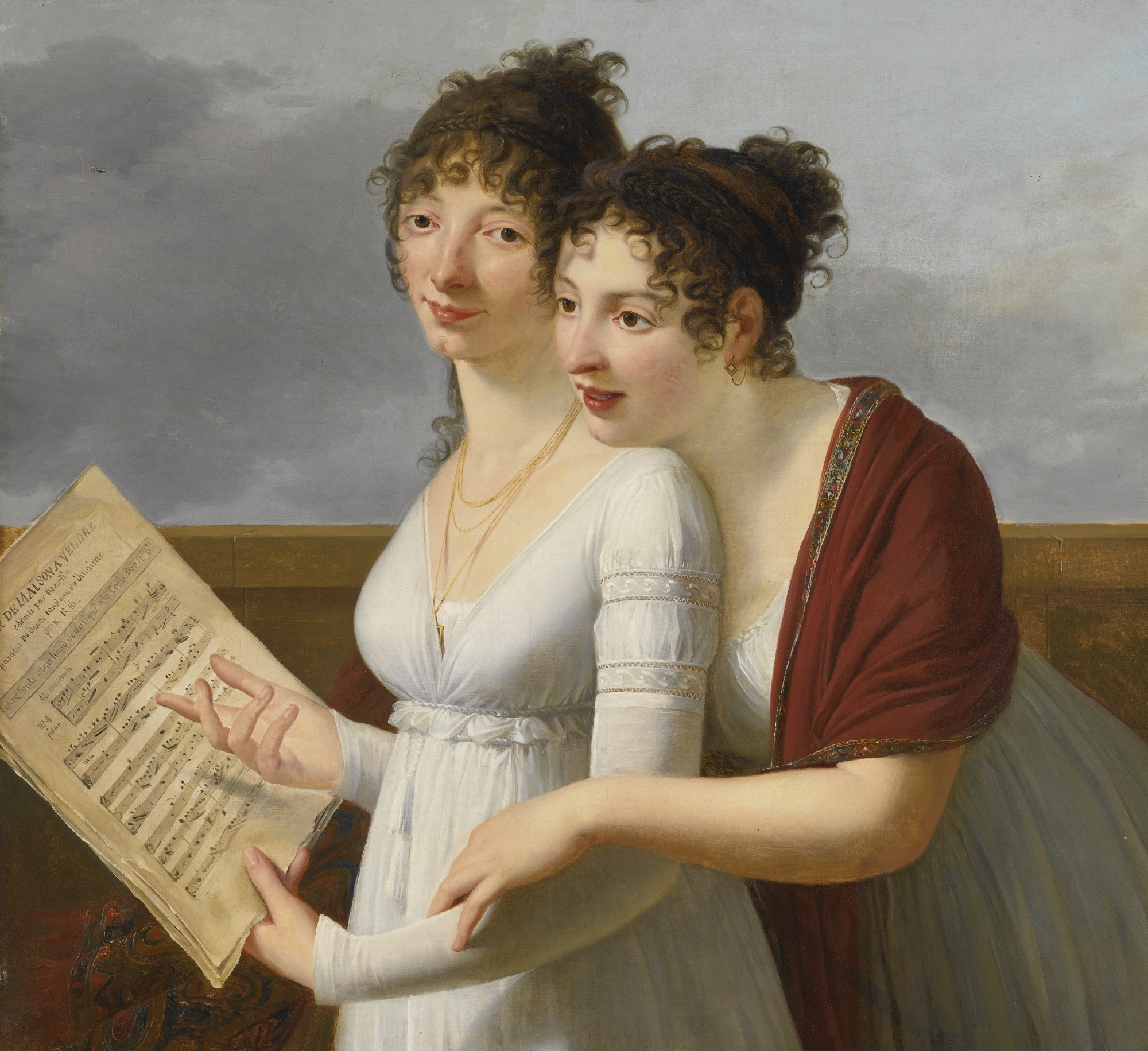
Portrait by Robert Lefèvre of two elegantly dressed Ladies, with sheet music of Aire de Maison à vendre

- Aire de Maison à vendre (1800)
- Léhéman (1801)
- L'antichambre (1802)
- La boucle de cheveux (1803)
- La jeune prude (1804)
- Une heure de mariage (1804)
- Le Pavillon du Calife, ou Almanzor et Zobéïde, opera in two acts and in free verse, in collaboration with Jean-Baptiste-Denis Despré and Étienne Morel de Chédeville (1805)
- Le pavillon des fleurs (1805)
- Gulistan ou Le hulla de Samarcande (1805)
- Deux mots (1806)
- Koulouf ou Les chinois (1806)
- Lina (1807)
- Élise-Hortense (1808)
- Les trois sultanes (1809)
- Le poète et le musicien (1809, op. post., f.p. 1811)

== See also ==
- Les Neuf Sœurs
