= Henri-Montan Berton =

French composer, teacher, and writer

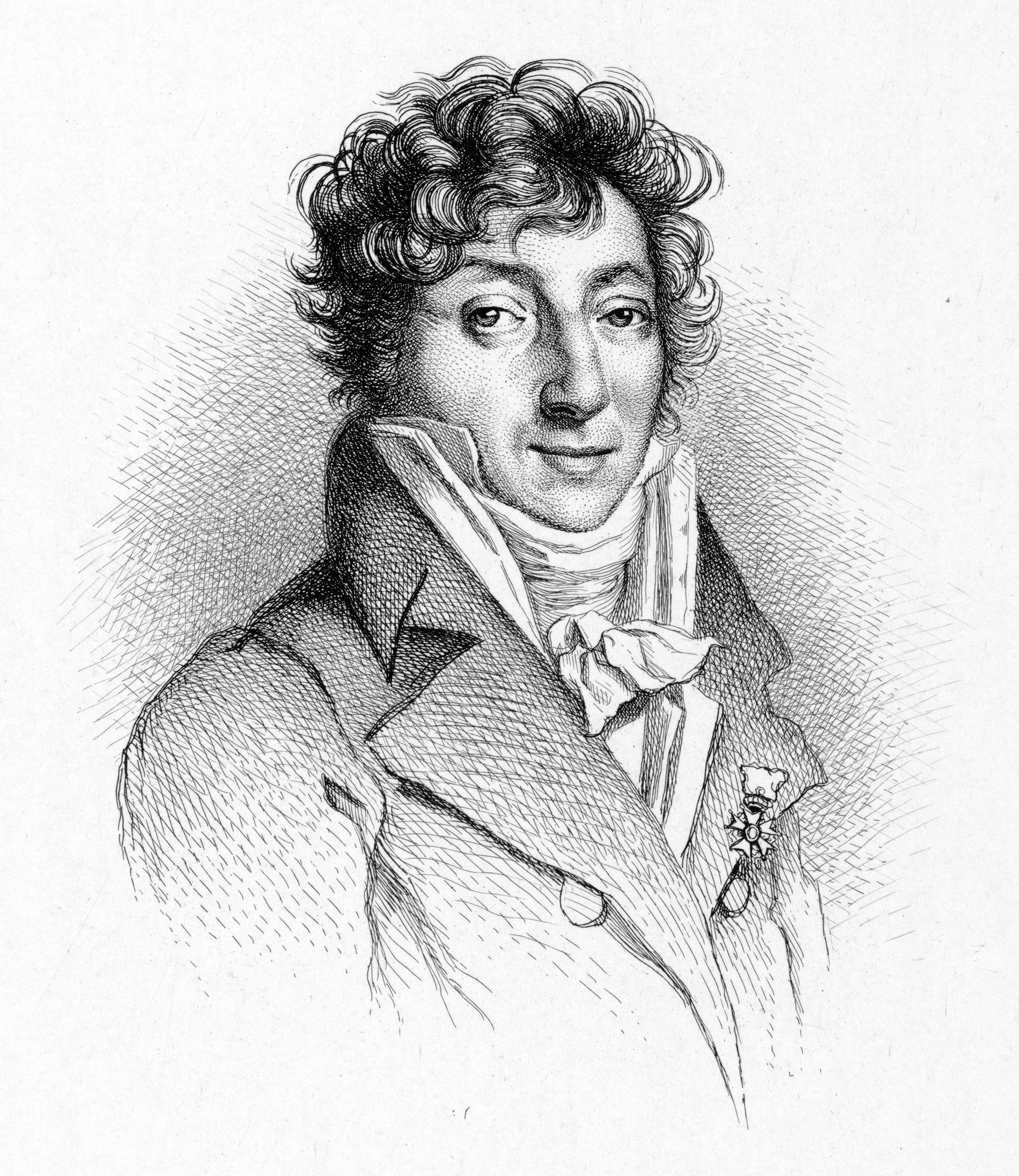
H.-M. Berton (Masson, Deblois & Massard 1868)

Henri-Montan Berton (17 September 1767 – 22 April 1844) was a French composer, teacher, and writer, mostly known as a composer of operas for the Opéra-Comique.

== Career ==
Henri-Montan Berton was born the son of Pierre Montan Berton. He is principally remembered as a composer of operas, most of which were first performed at the Opéra-Comique. Riding a wave of anti-clericalism which arose at the time of the French Revolution, his first real success was with Les rigueurs du cloître (23 August 1790), "in which a young nun is saved from entombment at the hands of a corrupt mother superior." The work has been described as the first rescue opera. Later more notable operas include Montano et Stéphanie (15 April 1799), Le délire (7 December 1799), and La Romance (26 January 1804). One of his greatest early successes was Aline, reine de Golconde (3 September 1803), which was performed internationally. Later in his career he tried tragedy with Virginie, which was premiered by the Paris Opera at the Salle Le Peletier on 11 June 1823, and received a total of 39 performances. His greatest success was Les deux mousqetaires, which was premiered by the Opéra-Comique at the Salle Feydeau on 22 December 1824 and continued to be performed each year up to 1834, receiving a total of 117 representations.

He was the music director of the Théâtre de l'Impératrice from 1807 to 1810 and the chorus master at the Paris Opera from 1810 to 1815. After Étienne Méhul's death on 18 October 1817, Berton was appointed to take over Méhul's composition class at the Paris Conservatoire on 1 January 1818, and continued to teach there until his death in 1844. Among his students were François Bazin, Bernhard Crusell, Louis-Barthélémy Pradher and Adolf Schimon.

Following in the family tradition, his son, Henri François Berton was also a composer, and several of his works were performed at the Opéra-Comique.
