= Château Sentout =

Coordinates: 44°43′44″N 0°25′19″W

Château Sentout is a castle in Tabanac, in the department of Gironde in southwestern France.

It dates from the 16th century, but has been modified in the 17th, 18th and 19th centuries.

== History ==
It is now converted to gîtes but its history can be traced back to at least 1650 (as documented in Bordeaux's archives) when the owner was Monsieur Jean de Sentout. In 1740, the then owner, Baron de Gasq, Minister of Parliament for Bordeaux, sold the Château to Monsieur Jean Letellier, ship-chandler to the navy, who delivered his wine and merchandise from his residence at rue du Chai des Farines in Bordeaux to the docks. With the addition of Château Sentout, Monsieur Letellier's property covered over 3 square kilometres of woodland, fields and vineyards, some of which were situated at the "Bastide", now Bordeaux's right bank. Monsieur Letellier also had dealings with the so-called triangular trade trading between Europe, Africa and America. His descendants, B and R Letellier and later, the Laville de Lacombe family, owned the Château.

During the nineteenth century then, by marriage to Aline Laville de Lacombe, Monsieur Eugène Fichot, a hydrographical engineer to the navy and member of the French Academy of Sciences, became the owner of Sentout. Monsieur Fichot, amongst other achievements, plotted the map of the Indo-Chinese coastline. Château Sentout produced wine until its last official harvest of 1972.

There are two reasons for the vineyard's decline. Firstly, the wine business as a whole was badly hit after the Second World War affecting, in particular, the production of white wine. Secondly, the Fichot family used the Château as their summer residence only, spending the rest of the year in Paris. This meant that the estate gradually fell into a state of disrepair. In particular, the roofs, which required constant attention, began to leak, causing the beams to rot and eventually many roofs caved in. There had in fact been no serious repair work undertaken since 1864. Due to various French legal problems governing inheritance, the Château was eventually sold in 1973 by court order for only FF 170,000.

The new owners, Monsieur Gugnon and his son, had the intention of building houses on the estate. However, Tabanac's mayor, Monsieur Fabre, retired glass artist and engraver, despite suffering from silicosis, continuously opposed the project in order to preserve the Château's character. After seven years, Messieurs Gugnon sold the property to the Peltier family in 1980. Since then, the Peltiers have restored the estate carefully respecting its special character.

== Architecture ==
The Château's differing architectural styles which mark the passing years lend to its elegance and unique charm. An Italian feel is created by the Genoese storehouse and its Tuscan columns found in the courtyard. The inner courtyard's patio is Spanish in style and the windows leading from the main house to the bishop's bedroom are Moorish - "Retour d'Egypte" (1813).

The window bays of the main house were originally arched. These were bricked up long ago and replaced in the eighteenth century by larger rectangular bays. However, an example of one of the original bays can still be seen in the library, but only from the inside!

The main house, flanked on both sides by two massive square towers surmounted by balustrades, is embellished by two turrets and a large square tower, all three roofed with slate. The terrace at the front of the house is decorated with a stone balustrade offered by Château Lacaussade in settlement for a lawsuit.

The bakery, situated next to the entrance gates and in which the oven is surmounted by a slate-roofed turret, was where Madame Fichot lived from 1948 for a few years until she died aged 94 years old. The staircase was built by Monsieur Giresse, a carpenter at Langoiran and grandfather of the footballer, Alain Giresse. He re-used the wood kept since 1936 from the old wine press when it was replaced by a "modern" wine press in steel and cement.

The interior of the Chapel was originally coated with lime and daubed with ochre and red chalk. In 1864, it was heightened, columns were added and a trompe l'oeil oak panelling was painted by Monsieur Gaston Coudray.

The storehouse containing the wine barrels is a typical example of Bordeaux's eighteenth-century architectural style with its four-sided sloping slate roof and double triangular gables, which caved in during the 1970s due to lack of maintenance. The adjacent storehouses which housed the wine press and the oak casks met with the same fate in 1981. The wine press can however still be seen standing in the open air in the rose garden.

Monsieur Lieuzere, painter and glass artist, made the stained-glass windows in 1864. Badly damaged by storms and children, they were restored by Muriel Goupil, an experienced glass artist, in 1985. The floor is paved laterally with tiles from the Gironde, the centre of which is decorated with black, green and vermilion hardened plaster.

New roofs now cover the wide-arched coach house, stable and hayloft (the row of buildings closest to the swimming pool). The old crumbling roof and beams had fallen on the rusting carriages below destroying them beyond repair.

There is a statue of the Virgin Mary standing on a rock sheltered by an arbour. According to Monsieur Fichot's descendants, the arbour was designed by Le Nôtre, famous landscape architect, who created "Garden à la française" in the 17th century.
