= Peletier =

Peletier may refer to:

- Peletier, North Carolina
- Peletier Plateau
- Peletier (surname)

== See also ==
- Le Peletier (disambiguation)
- Pelletier (disambiguation)
