= Ève Demaillot =

French comedian, man of letters, journalist and revolutionary

- Born: Antoine-François Ève; 21 May 1747; Dole, France
- Died: 18 July 1814 (aged 67); Paris
- Occupations: Actor; Playwright; Journalist

Antoine-François Ève, also known by the name Ève Demaillot and the pseudonyms Antoine-François Ève-Démaillot, Démaillot, Ève Démaillot, Desmaillot, Maillot, Des Maillots..., (French: [ɛv dəmajo]; 21 May 1747 in Dole – 18 July 1814 in Dubois hospital in Paris) was a French comedian, man of letters, journalist and revolutionary.

A volunteer in the royal army at eighteen, he deserted after a few years and fled to Amsterdam, where he held for seven years the acting profession. Back in France, he was tutor to Saint-Just for some time and played comedies and opéras comiques. In 1789, he also turned to journalism and engaged in the revolutionary movement.

An agent of the Committee of Public Safety in 1794, he was imprisoned for a while during the Thermidorian Reaction. Dedicated to journalism and theater after his release, he directed the character of Madame Angot in several of his plays.

Hostile to the regime introduced by Bonaparte after the coup of 18 Brumaire, he participated in the attempted coup led by general Malet in October 1812 and spent several years in jail under the Consulat and the Empire.

== Works ==
- 1785: Figaro, directeur des marionnettes, comédie en 1 acte et en prose, mêlée de vaudevilles et d'ariettes, par M. E. D. (Palais-Royal, 31 December 1784), Paris, Hardouin, 36 pages.
- 1785: Le Vieux soldat et sa pupille, opéra comique in one act and in verse (free), mingled with ariettes, premiered at Théâtre du Palais-Royal 6 June, Paris, Brunet, 1785, 28 pages.
- 1787: Célestine, three-act opéra comique, given at Comédie-Italienne
- 1787: La Fille garçon, two-act opera, presented 18 August at Théâtre Italien on a music by chevalier de Saint-George
- c. 1789: «Argumentum adhominem» à l'auteur du : «Domine, salvum fac regem» (signed Demaillot), Paris, Imprimerie de Giroüard, 12 pages.
- Les Subsistances du peuple ajournées (signed Ève Démaillot), Paris, Imprimerie de l'Ami de la Constitution, 8 pages.
- 1794: Le congrès des rois, comedy in three acts and in prose mingled with ariettes, created 8 ventôse an II (26 February) Opéra-Comique (salle Favart), on a music to which twelve composers participated: Henri-Montan Berton, Frédéric Blasius, Luigi Cherubini, Nicolas Dalayrac, Prosper-Didier Deshayes, François Devienne, André Grétry, Hyacinthe Jadin, Rodolphe Kreutzer, Étienne-Nicolas Méhul, Jean-Pierre Solié and Trial fils.
- L'Orateur plébéien ou le Défenseur de la République, par une société d'écrivains patriotes (21 burmaire-30 germinal an IV), Paris, Marchand, 94 numéros, in-8°.
- 1797: Madame Angot, ou la Poissarde parvenue, two-act opéra comique performed at Théâtre d'Émulation, Paris, chez Barba, 40 pages (reprint at magasin de pièces de théâtres, 1800, 27 pages, and Barba, An X, 42 pages).
- 1797: Le Mariage de Nanon, ou la Suite de Mme Angot, one-act comedy in prose, presented at Théâtre d'Émulation, Paris, chez les marchands de nouveautés, 34 pages (reprint 1798, 28 pages).
- 1797: La Chaumière, one-act comedy.
- 1797: Les Soupers de Madame Angot ou le Contradicteur, par le citoyen Maillot, Imprimerie de Madame Angot, Paris, number 1-13.
- 1801: Le Repentir de Madame Angot, ou Le mariage de Nicolas, comédie-folie in 2 acts, mingled with songs, given at Théâtre de la Gaîté, Paris, Marchand, 47 pages.
- 1803: Les Dernières folies de Madame Angot.
- 1805: Les Méprises par les noms.
- 1805: Arlequin de retour, ou l'heureux Dénoûment.
- 1814: Tableau historique des prisons d'État en France sous le règne de Buonaparte, par M. Ève, dit Démaillot, vieillard infirme et prisonnier d'État pendant dix ans, Paris, Delaunay, IV-123 pages and music.
- A.-F. Ève-Démaillot à ses concitoyens, 32 pages.

== Bibliography ==
- Désiré Baud, Le Dolois Ève-Demaillot (1747-1814), agent du Comité de Salut Public, "Mémoires de l'Académie de Besançon", vol. 172, 1958, (p. 173-196).

== Sources ==
- Henry Lyonnet (1904). Dictionnaire des comédiens français, ceux d'hier. Vol. 1. Librairie théâtrale. p. 499. Lyonnet..
- «« Desmaillot (Antoine-François Ève) », Biographie universelle, ancienne et moderne ou histoire, par ordre alphabétique, de la vie publique et privée de tous les hommes qui se sont fait remarquer par leurs écrits, leurs actions, leurs talents, leurs vertus ou leurs crimes, Louis-Gabriel Michaud, vol. 62, 1837, (p. 392-394)
- « Ève (Ant.-Franç.), dit Démaillot », in Joseph-Marie Quérard (1827–1839). La France littéraire ou Dictionnaire bibliographique des savants, historiens et gens de lettres de la France, ainsi que des littérateurs étrangers qui ont écrit en français, plus particulièrement pendant les XVIIIe et XIXesiècles (in French). Vol. 3. Paris: Firmin Didot père et fils, puis Firmin Didot frères. p. 47. Quérard..
