= Donald Harris (composer) =

American composer

- Born: April 7, 1931; St. Paul, Minnesota, US
- Died: March 29, 2016 (aged 84); Columbus, Ohio, US
- Education: University of Michigan; Tanglewood Music Center
- Occupations: Classical composer; Academic teacher
- Organization: Ohio State University

Donald Harris (April 7, 1931, in St. Paul, Minnesota – March 29, 2016, in Columbus, Ohio) was an American composer who taught music at Ohio State University for 22 years. He was Dean of the College of the Arts from 1988 to 1997.

Harris earned a bachelor's degree and a master's degree in music from the University of Michigan. He completed further studies at the Tanglewood Music Center and the Centre Français d'Humanisme Musical in Aix-en-Provence. He studied with Ross Lee Finney, Max Deutsch, Nadia Boulanger, Boris Blacher, Lukas Foss, and André Jolivet. He founded the Contemporary Music Festival at Ohio State in 2000. Prior to joining the faculty at Ohio State, he served on the faculties and as an administrator of the New England Conservatory of Music and the Hartt School of Music. From 1954 to 1968, Harris lived in Paris, where he served as music consultant to the United States Information Agency and produced the city's first postwar Festival of Contemporary American Music. A documentary about Harris entitled Sonata 1957 was produced by Daniel Beliavsky through opus1films in 2011. It explores Harris's development in mid-20th-century Paris, when pre-war musical thought bridged with post-war experimentation.

== Works ==
=== Stage works ===
- The Legend Of John Henry (1954) ballet for orchestra
- The Golden Deer (1955) ballet for orchestra
- Intervals (1959) dance work for chamber ensemble

=== Other ===
- Piano Sonata (1957)
- Fantasy For Violin & Piano (1957)
- Symphony In Two Movements (1958–1961)
- String Quartet (1965)
- Ludus (1966) for ten instruments
- Ludus II (1973) for five instruments
- On Variations (1976) for chamber orchestra
- Charmes (1971–1980; unfinished) for soprano and orchestra; after the poems of Paul Valéry
- For The Night To Wear (1978) for mezzo-soprano and chamber ensemble; after the Hortense Flexner poem
- Balladen (1979) for solo piano
- Of Hartford In A Purple Light (1979) for soprano with piano accompaniment; after the Wallace Stevens poem
- Prelude To A Concert In Connecticut (1981) for orchestra
- Les Mains (1983) for mezzo-soprano with piano accompaniment; after the Marguerite Yourcenar poem
- Meditations (1984) for solo organ, commissioned by the South Congregational-First Baptist Church, New Britain, Connecticut, and its organist and music director, Richard Coffey, to honor the 10th anniversary of the Cooper Memorial Organ. Includes memorials to Thomas Putsche (Ralph Vaughan Williams' Sine Nomine) and Norman Dinerstein (Kol Nidre).
- Three Fanfares For Four Horns (1984)
- Canzona & Carol (1986) for double brass quintet and timpani
- Pierrot Lieder (1988) for soprano and chamber ensemble; after the Albert Giraud poem
- Mermaid Variations (1992) for chamber orchestra
- String Quartet #2 (2002)
- A Lyric Fanfare (2003) for orchestra
- Five Tempi (Ludus III) (2004) for chamber ensemble
- Symphony No. 2 (2006–11) for large orchestra; co-commissioned by the Koussevitzky Music Foundation and Columbus Symphony Orchestra
- Kaleidoscope (2007) for orchestra

== Awards and honors ==
Harris was awarded a Fulbright Award in 1956, the Prince Rainier III of Monaco Composition Award in 1962 (deuxieme mention), a Guggenheim Fellowship in 1966, a National Endowment for the Arts Fellowship Grant in Composition in 1974, the A.C. Fuller Award of the Julius Hartt Musical Foundation in 1988, and the ASCAP/Deems Taylor Award in 1989 (for co-editing The Berg Schoenberg Correspondence). He received commissions with the Serge Koussevitzky Music Foundation (Library of Congress), Elizabeth Sprague Coolidge Foundation (Library of Congress), St. Paul Chamber Orchestra, Radio France, Cleveland Orchestra, Goethe Institute (Boston), Boston Musica Viva, Connecticut Public Radio, Cleveland Chamber Symphony, Arnold Schoenberg Institute, and Festival of Contemporary American Music at Tanglewood. In 1991, he received an award in composition from the American Academy of Arts and Letters, which led to a retrospective recording of his work on the CRI label in 1994. In 2011, he was the featured composer of the Ohio State University Contemporary Music Festival, a festival which he founded. The King Arts Complex honored him with a Legends & Legacies award in October 2011. He received an honorary Doctor of Music degree from Ohio State in June 2012.
