= Gwiazda =

Gwiazda may refer to:

- Andrzej Gwiazda (born 1935), in Gdańsk engineer and prominent opposition leader
- Gwiazda Lake, ribbon lake situated in Pomeranian Voivodeship in Bytów County
- Gwiazda Polski, balloon designed by the Polish planners to reach the stratosphere
- Henry Gwiazda (born 1952), composer who specializes in virtual audio (simulation of a 3D sound space)
- Joanna Duda-Gwiazda (born 1939), wife of Andrzej Gwiazda, Polish politician
- Gwiazda (Holyoke) (1923–1956), Holyoke, Massachusetts newspaper published in Polish
- Gwiazda (Philadelphia) (1902–1985), Philadelphia newspaper published in Polish
