= 1988–89 FIS Alpine Ski Europa Cup =

Alpine skiing competition

Discipline	Men	Women
Overall	(Austria) Stephan Eberharter	(Austria) Sabine Ginther
Downhill	(Italy) Kristian Ghedina	(Austria) Sabine Ginther
Super-G	(Socialist Federal Republic of Yugoslavia) Tomaž Čižman	(Japan) Emi Kawabata
Giant Slalom	(Italy) Attilio Barcella (Austria) Stephan Eberharter	(Switzerland) Elisabeth Giger
Slalom	(Czechoslovakia) Peter Jurko	(United States) Monique Pelletier

Competition

1988–89 FIS Alpine Ski Europa Cup was the 18th season of the FIS Alpine Ski Europa Cup.

== Standings ==
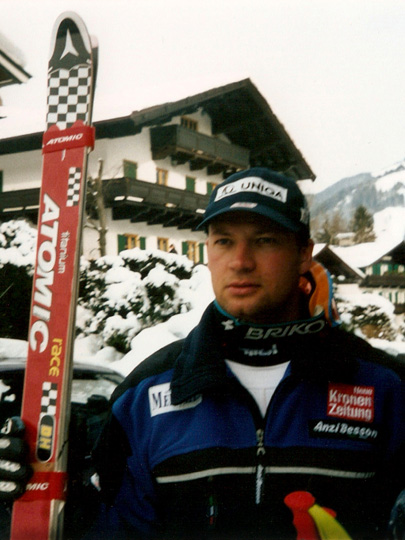
The Austrian Stephan Eberharter, the winner of the men's overall standings.

=== Overall ===
Men's

Rank	Skier	Country	Points
1	Stephan Eberharter	Austria	152
2	Tomaž Čižman	Yugoslavia	137
3	Attilio Barcella	Italy	119
4	Peter Yurko	Czechoslovakia	106
5	Sergio Bergamelli	Italy	102
6	Mathias Bertold	Austria	97
7	Urs Kälin	Switzerland	95
8	Rudolf Stocker	Austria	90
9	Steve Locher	Switzerland	87
9	Oliver Künzi	Switzerland	87

Ladies

Rank	Skier	Country	Points
1	Sabine Ginther	Austria	216
2	Stefanie Schuster	Austria	118
3	Monique Pelletier	United States	134
4	Elisabeth Giger	Austria	132
5	Ingrid Stöckl	Austria	129
6	Katrin Stotz	West Germany	99
7	Kristi Terzian	United States	95
8	Brigitte Gadient	Switzerland	92
9	Christine von Grünigen	Switzerland	85
9	Agneta Hjorth	Sweden	85

=== Downhill ===
Men's

Rank	Skier	Country	Points
1	Kristian Ghedina	Italy	75
2	Peter Eigler	West Germany	67
3	Rudolf Stocker	Austria	65
4	Hannes Tientner	West Germany	57
5	Xavier Gigandet	Switzerland	53

Ladies

Rank	Skier	Country	Points
1	Sabine Ginther	Austria	77
2	Ula Lodzinya	Soviet Union	50
3	Ingrid Stöckl	Austria	46
4	Kristin Krone	United States	40
5	Varvara Zelenskaya	Soviet Union	39

=== Super G ===
Men's

Rank	Skier	Country	Points
1	Tomaž Čižman	Yugoslavia	67
2	Jerôme Noviant	France	61
3	Urs Kälin	Switzerland	57
4	Stephan Eberharter	Austria	37
5	Konrad Walk	Austria	34

Ladies

Rank	Skier	Country	Points
1	Emi Kawabata	Japan	50
2	Anja Straupeneck	West Germany	37
3	Katrin Stotz	West Germany	36
4	Elisabeth Giger	Switzerland	30
5	Katja Seizinger	West Germany	23

=== Giant Slalom ===
Men's

Rank	Skier	Country	Points
1	Stephan Eberharter	Austria	95
1	Attilio Barcella	Italy	95
3	Steve Locher	Switzerland	72
4	Tomaž Čižman	Yugoslavia	70
5	Mathias Bertold	Austria	67

Ladies

Rank	Skier	Country	Points
1	Elisabeth Giger	Switzerland	86
2	Sabine Ginther	Austria	75
3	Birgit Wolfram	Austria	71
4	Sandra Burn	Switzerland	61
5	Katrin Stotz	West Germany	55

=== Slalom ===
Men's

Rank	Skier	Country	Points
1	Peter Yurko	Czechoslovakia	106
2	Christophe Berra	Switzerland	65
2	Didier Schmidt	France	65
4	Thomas Stangassinger	Austria	62
5	Sergio Bergamelli	Italy	58

Ladies

Rank	Skier	Country	Points
1	Monique Pelletier	United States	129
2	Stefanie Schuster	Austria	116
3	Agneta Hjorth	Sweden	76
4	Christine von Grünigen	Switzerland	73
5	Nathalie Jamet	France	67
