= Arnold Franchetti =

Italian-American composer (1911–1993)

Arnold Franchetti (1911–1993) was a composer born in Lucca, Italy who later emigrated to the United States.

== Early life ==
As a boy, Franchetti studied composition and piano with his father, Baron Alberto Franchetti (1860–1942). Arnold Franchetti studied physics at the University of Florence, music at the Salzburg Mozarteum, and then moved to Munich from 1937 to 1939, where he studied composition and orchestration with composer Richard Strauss. After a brief stint with the Italian army during World War II, Franchetti joined the anti-Mussolini underground resistance in the Italian Alps where he helped Allied airmen escape.

== In the USA ==
Franchetti emigrated to the US in 1947. He was befriended by Aaron Copland, who helped the young immigrant composer gain a professional footing by arranging performances of Franchetti's chamber music in Boston, New York City, Philadelphia, and Washington, D.C. Franchetti took a position at the Hartt School of Music, Hartford, Connecticut, in 1948, where he became chair of the theory and composition department, remaining there until his retirement in 1979. Franchetti's composition students have included: Barbara Kolb, Michael Schelle, Joel Pelletier, Robert Beaser, Martin Bresnick, Henry Gwiazda, Norman Dinerstein, Gwynneth Van Anden Walker, others.

During his 45 years in the United States, Franchetti received composition honors and awards from the Guggenheim Foundation, the National Endowment for the Arts, National Institute of Arts and Letters, and many other prestigious organizations.

He died on March 7, 1993, at Middlesex Hospital in Cromwell, Connecticut.

== Compositions ==
In his early works, Franchetti experimented with late Romantic and neoclassical styles, but he then developed what Imanuel Willheim called "a non-serial, 12-note compositional language featuring primarily diatonic motivic material". Franchetti composed music in all genres including orchestral, symphonic, chamber and solo music (including five piano sonatas, significant works that have been analyzed in multiple doctoral dissertations).

Franchetti composed numerous theatre works including the opera, Married Men Go to Hell (1974) and the genre-bending Dracula 1979. Another important Franchetti theatrical work is Lazarus (for narrator and symphonic wind ensemble) based on the book Soul on Ice by 1960's Black Panther activist Eldridge Cleaver.
