= Fichot =

Fichot (French: [fiʃo]) is a French surname. Notable people with the surname include:

- Eugène Fichot (1867–1939), French hydrographer and geodesist
- Léon Fichot (1906–1992), French racing cyclist
- Philippe Fichot, French electronic musician and multimedia artist
