= Peltier =

Peltier is a French surname. Notable people with the surname include:

- Autumn Peltier (born 2004), climate activist
- Edo Peltier, birth name of Mexican drag queen Margaret Y Ya
- Fanny Peltier (born 1997), French sprinter
- Harvey Peltier, Jr. (1923–1980), American politician
- Harvey Peltier, Sr. (1899–1977), American politician
- Jean Charles Athanase Peltier (1785–1845), French physicist, documented the Peltier effect
- Lee Peltier (born 1986), English football player
- Leonard Peltier (born 1944), Native American activist who was convicted of the murder of two FBI Agents
- Leslie Peltier (1900–1980), American astronomer
- Marie Peltier (born 1980), Belgian author
- Thérèse Peltier (1873–1926), French sculptor and aviator
- William Richard Peltier (born 1943), University of Toronto professor and physicist

== See also ==
- Peletier (disambiguation)
- Pelletier, a surname
- Peltier effect, in physics
  - Peltier device, a thermoelectric heat pump
