= Peletier (surname) =

Peletier may refer to:

- Bert Peletier (1937–2023), Dutch mathematician
- Carol Peletier, a fictional character from the comic book series and television series The Walking Dead
  - Ed Peletier, husband of fictional Carol Peletier
  - Sophia Peletier, daughter of fictional Carol Peletier
- Jacques Pelletier du Mans (1517–1582), also spelled Peletier, humanist, poet and mathematician of the French Renaissance
- Louis-Michel le Peletier, marquis de Saint-Fargeau (1760–1793), French politician, Freemason, and martyr of the Revolution.
  - Suzanne le Peletier de Saint-Fargeau (1782–1829), daughter of Louis-Michel, who was adopted as the "Daughter of the State" following her father's assassination.
