= Le Peletier =

The name le Peletier (also spelled Lepeletier or Lepelletier) may refer to:

== People ==
- Amédée Louis Michel le Peletier, comte de Saint-Fargeau (1770–1845), French entomologist
- Edmond Lepelletier (1846–1913), French journalist, poet and politician
- Louis-Michel le Peletier, marquis de Saint-Fargeau (1760–1793), French politician

== Other ==
- Le Peletier station, a Paris Metro station
- Lepelletier gear mechanism, three degrees of freedom epicyclic gear mechanism
- Salle Le Peletier, home of the Paris Opera, 1821-1873

== See also ==
- Le Peletier de Saint Fargeau, a surname
