= Pelletier =

Pelletier is a common surname of French origin. Notable people with this surname include:

- Anne-Marie Pelletier, French Bible scholar
- Anne-Sophie Pelletier, French politician
- Annie Pelletier, Canadian diver
- Benoît Pelletier, Canadian politician from Quebec
- Bronson Pelletier, Canadian actor
- Bruno Pelletier, Canadian musician
- Colombe Pelletier (1923–2021), Canadian pianist, coach and accompanist
- David Pelletier, Canadian figure skater
- Delphine Pelletier, French triathlete
- Gérard Pelletier, Canadian journalist
- Hélène Pelletier-Baillargeon, Canadian journalist and writer
- Irvin Pelletier, Canadian politician
- J. D. Denis Pelletier (born 1948), Canadian judge
- Jacques Pelletier (1929–2007), French politician
- Jacques Pelletier du Mans, French humanist, poet and mathematician
- Jakob Pelletier, Canadian ice hockey player
- Jared Pelletier, Canadian film director
- Jean Pelletier, Canadian politician
- Jean-Jacques Pelletier, Canadian philosopher and author
- Jean-Marc Pelletier, Canadian hockey goaltender
- Joel Pelletier, American artist, musician and writer
- Madeleine Pelletier (1874–1939), French feminist and psychiatrist
- Marie Denise Pelletier, Canadian francophone singer
- Mary Euphrasia Pelletier, French religious sister and saint
- Marie-Ève Pelletier, Canadian former tennis player
- Marsha Pelletier (born 1950), American politician
- Maurice Pelletier (1896–1971), Canadian politician
- Monique Pelletier (politician) (1926–2025), French judge and politician
- Monique Pelletier (skier) (born 1969), American alpine skier
- Narcisse Pelletier, Cabin boy abandoned on the coast of Cape York Peninsula in Australia in 1857 and spent 17 years among the Aborigines
- Nicolas Jacques Pelletier, French highwayman, first person executed by guillotine in France
- Pedro Eugenio Pelletier, French-born Dominican Republic independence war commandant and national hero
- Pierre-Joseph Pelletier, French chemist
- Pol Pelletier, Canadian actor, director, and playwright
- Wilfrid Pelletier, Canadian conductor
- Yannick Pelletier, Swiss chess player
- Yves P. Pelletier, Quebec actor and comedian

== See also ==
- Lac Pelletier, Saskatchewan, Canada
  - Rural Municipality of Lac Pelletier No. 107
