= Le Peletier de Saint Fargeau =

Le Peletier de Saint Fargeau may refer to:

- Amédée Louis Michel le Peletier, comte de Saint-Fargeau (1770–1845), French entomologist
- Louis-Michel le Peletier, marquis de Saint-Fargeau (1760–1793), French politician and martyr
