= Attilio Barcella =

Italian alpine skier

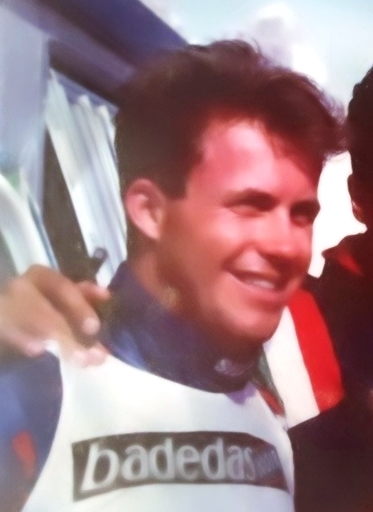
- Barcella in 1989.

Personal information
- Born: 6 June 1966 (age 60) Trescore Balneario, Italy

Skiing career
- Sport: Alpine skiing
- Retired: 2008
- Disciplines: Giant slalom and Super-G
- World Cup debut: 1989

World Cup
- Seasons: 3
- Podiums: 0

Attilio Barcella (born 6 June 1966) is a former Italian alpine skier.

== Biography ==
The best results of his career were the victory in the discipline cup (giant slalom) in the FIS Alpine Ski Europa Cup in 1989 and was also 3rd in overall, a national title (giant slalom) at the Italian Alpine Ski Championships in 1989, and a top ten result (5th place) in FIS Alpine Ski World Cup always in giant slalom and always in 1989 season.

== World Cup results ==
Top 10

Date	Place	Discipline	Rank
29-11-1988	(France) Val Thorens	Giant slalom	5

== Europa Cup results ==
Barcella has won a Europa Cup discipline cup.

- FIS Alpine Ski Europa Cup
  - Giant slalom: 1989

== National titles ==
Barcella has won an national championship at individual senior level.

- Italian Alpine Ski Championships
  - Giant slalom: 1989
