= Le congrès des rois =

Opera by twelve composers

- Opéra comique by Antoine-François Ève
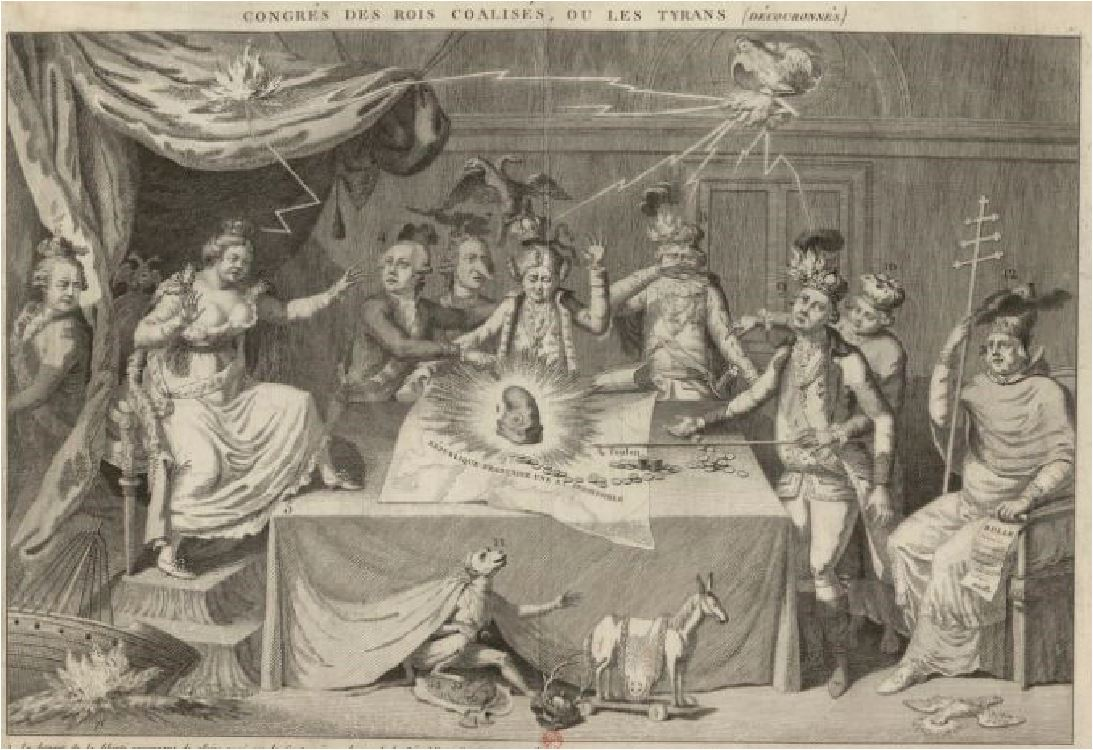
- Description: Congress of the Allied Kings, or the Tyrants (uncrowned), print of Barnabé-Augustin de Mailly, 1794 (Note: The names of the characters, with the nicknames given by the artist, are shown as image annotations on the file on Wikimedia Commons.).
- Native title: Le congrès des rois
- Translation: Congress of the Allied Kings
- Other title: The Tyrants (uncrowned)
- Librettist: Henri-Montan Berton
- Language: French
- Premiere: 26 February 1794; Opéra-Comique, Paris, France

Le congrès des rois (The Congress of the Kings) was a 3-act French Revolutionary opera of the genre comédie mêlée d'ariettes with a libretto by De Maillot, a stage name used by Antoine-François Ève early in his career, and music by a collaborative of twelve composers (see below). It was a satire directed against the "enemies of France". The libretto and most of the music (except for that by Henri-Montan Berton) has been lost.

The composition of the opera was ordered by the Comité du Salut public (Committee of Public Safety) to be completed in two days. The opera was first performed on 26 February 1794 [8 vent II] by the Opéra-Comique in the first Salle Favart and was presented a total of 2 times. At the premiere, "the length of the work and its couplets' lack of charm tired the audience, which took out its bad feelings on the ballet. Sharp whistles grew louder still, and the authors were not acknowledged." When the second performance met a similar reception, the management ended its run.

The opera tells the story of an imagined meeting of monarchs at the court of Prussia to discuss the partition of France. Participants include the kings of England, Spain, Sardinia, and Naples, the Austrian emperor, and the English minister Pitt. Catherine II of Russia has sent a representative and the pope has delegated Cagliostro to speak on his behalf. Madame Cagliostro engages six women, enemies of tyranny, to employ their charms to arouse the passions of these notables and have fun at their expense. Cagliostro is secretly a French patriot who plans to manipulate the others. He stages an elaborate show of ghosts who predict a revolution in which reason triumphs over error. The crowned heads are frightened, but one consoles the others: "Fortunately these are only ghosts." When the Congress finally meets, the assembly decides to partition France province by province. With a sudden burst of cannons, a group of French patriots arrive and force their way into the palace. The royals flee, return in disguise as sans-culottes crying "Vive La Republique!", and then escape. The French, having planted a liberty tree and made a bonfire of symbols of the Ancien Régime, dance and sing in praise of the awakening of the people and the downfall of tyranny.

The opera was later denounced in the Conseil général of the Commune de Paris on the grounds that it espoused anti-revolutionary ideas. Its representation of Cagliostro as a virtuous republican was thought scandalous, and the presentation of "the immortal Marat" in the procession of ghosts was deemed disrespectful. Aristocrats had been seen applauding. A police report was ordered and it confirmed the charges. Further performances were banned on 17 March 1794.

The libretto has not been found. A piano–vocal score in manuscript form of the music by Henri-Montan Berton is located at the Bibliothèque nationale de France (Département de la Musique, Ms. 3649).

== Composers ==
- Henri-Montan Berton
- Frédéric Blasius
- Luigi Cherubini
- Nicolas Dalayrac
- François Devienne
- Prosper-Didier Deshayes
- André Grétry
- Louis-Emmanuel Jadin
- Rodolphe Kreutzer
- Étienne Méhul
- Jean-Pierre Solié
- Armand-Emmanuel Trial (Trial fils)
