= Auguste-Louis Bertin d'Antilly =

French dramatist and journalist

Auguste-Louis Bertin d'Antilly (1763–1804) was a French dramatist and journalist whose patriotic songs and topical libretti were prominent during the French Revolution, but who emigrated from France under Napoleon.

Bertin d'Antilly possessed the sinecure of premier Commis des Finances au département des revenus casuels du Roi, and thus was a pensioner of Louis XVI. In 1783 his one-act L'Anglais à Paris was a comedy without overt political content, and his two-act comedy L'école de l'adolescence was played in June 1789; but that same year, as "Citoyen B. Dantilly" he wrote the libretto for Pierre-David-Augustin Chapelle's opéra comique, that is, with spoken rather than sung dialogue, La Vieillesse d’Annette et Lubin based on a story by Jean-François Marmontel: at the third act finale, peasants armed with their tools face the seigneurial regime in defiance.

His "Ode à l'Être Suprême" (Paris, 1794) reflects the Revolutionary Cult of the Supreme Being. Patriotic sentiments were to the fore in his libretto for La prise de Toulon par les français : opéra en trois actes, mêlés de prose, de vers et de chants, which celebrated the Siege of Toulon, an early Republican victory over a Royalist rebellion in the southern French port of Toulon, 18 December 1793. After the revenge assassination in January 1793 of Le Peletier de Saint Fargeau, who had cast the deciding vote for the execution of Louis XVI, Bertin d'Antilly provided the libretto to a two-act trait historique, Le Peletier de Saint-Fargeau, ou Le premier martyr de la République française, with music by Frédéric Blasius.

Under the Directoire Bertin d'Antilly abandoned his Jacobin views and moved to the political right. In 1797 he began to publish a daily journal of social and political commentary, Le Thé, ou Le journal des dixhuit, which ran from 16 April, under the epigraph "Je vois de loin; j'atteins de même"; it dropped its subtitle, ostensibly referring to eighteen editors, in favor of the subtitle Le contrôleur général. It was suppressed 18 fructidor An V (5 September 1797) in connection with the counter-revolutionary Coup of 18 Fructidor; earlier that year the Imprimerie du The that printed the journal had printed his "Disgrâce des triumvirs: chanson constitutionnelle", a commentary on disunion among the members of the French Directory. Some years later, a journal under the same title appeared, but Bertin d'Antilly had no part in its redaction. Firmly opposed to Napoleon, he had taken up residence at Hamburg, where he published the journal Le Censeur in collaboration with the émigré M. de Romance, chevalier de Mesmont; when Napoleon put diplomatic pressure on the Hamburg Senate, they were arrested, then released when the Comte d'Artois convinced the Russians to intervene on their behalf.
