= Tabanac =

- Commune
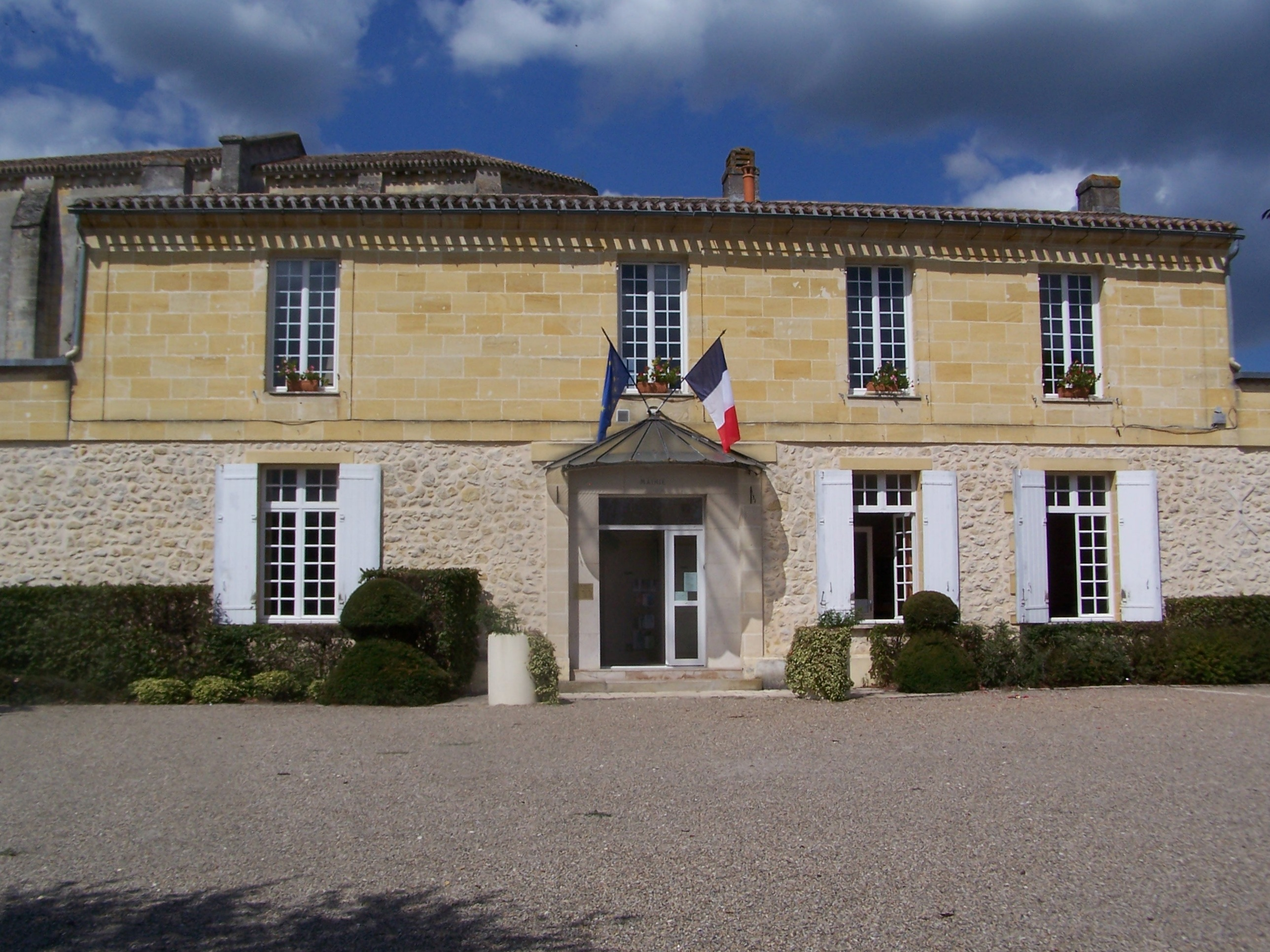
- The town hall in Tabanac

- Coat of arms
- Location of Tabanac
- Location within France Location within Nouvelle-Aquitaine
- Coordinates: 44°43′17″N 0°24′16″W
- Country: France
- Region: Nouvelle-Aquitaine
- Department: Gironde
- Arrondissement: Bordeaux
- Canton: L'Entre-Deux-Mers
- Intercommunality: Portes de l'Entre-Deux-Mers

Government
  - Mayor (2021–2026): Hélène Goga
- Area^{1}: 8 km^{2} (3.1 sq mi)
- Elevation: 80 m (260 ft)
- Highest elevation: 94 m (308 ft)
- Lowest elevation: 3 m (9.8 ft)
- Population (2023): 1,083
  - Density: 140/km^{2} (350/sq mi)
- Time zone: UTC+01:00 (CET)
  - Summer (DST): UTC+02:00 (CEST)
- INSEE/Postal code: 33518 /33550
- ^{1} French Land Register data, which excludes lakes, ponds, glaciers > 1 km^{2} (0.386 sq mi or 247 acres) and river estuaries.

Tabanac (French pronunciation: [tabanak]; Occitan: Tavanac) is a commune in the Gironde department in Nouvelle-Aquitaine in southwestern France.

It is located approximately a 30-minute drive from the centre of Bordeaux.

== Population ==
Historical population
| Year | Pop. | ±% p.a. |
|---|---|---|
| 1968 | 608 | — |
| 1975 | 678 | +1.57% |
| 1982 | 811 | +2.59% |
| 1990 | 889 | +1.15% |
| 1999 | 973 | +1.01% |
| 2007 | 1,061 | +1.09% |
| 2012 | 1,064 | +0.06% |
| 2017 | 1,082 | +0.34% |
| 2023 | 1,083 | +0.02% |
Source: INSEE

== Le Bourg ==
The centre (Le Bourg) of the commune of Tabanac is very picturesque and contains the church (built in 1874), the Mairie, local school, Chateau Renon (now a private house and not connected to the vineyard of the same name) and local housing. The small size of the Borg means that there are no shops or restaurants. There is a doctors surgery located in the Borg.

The town hall is in the centre of the village next to the church.

In addition to the Borg there are numerous hamlets in the commune such as Dourcy, Rouquet and others.

== Economy ==
Employment and economic activity within the commune is dominated by vineyards (Chateau Bessan, Chateau Clyde, Chateau de La Garosse, Chateau Plassan etc.). There are also gites of which Chateau Sentout, built in the 17th century, is the largest. In addition there are local tradesmen to support local needs.

== See also ==
- Communes of the Gironde department
