= Harry Behn =

American writer

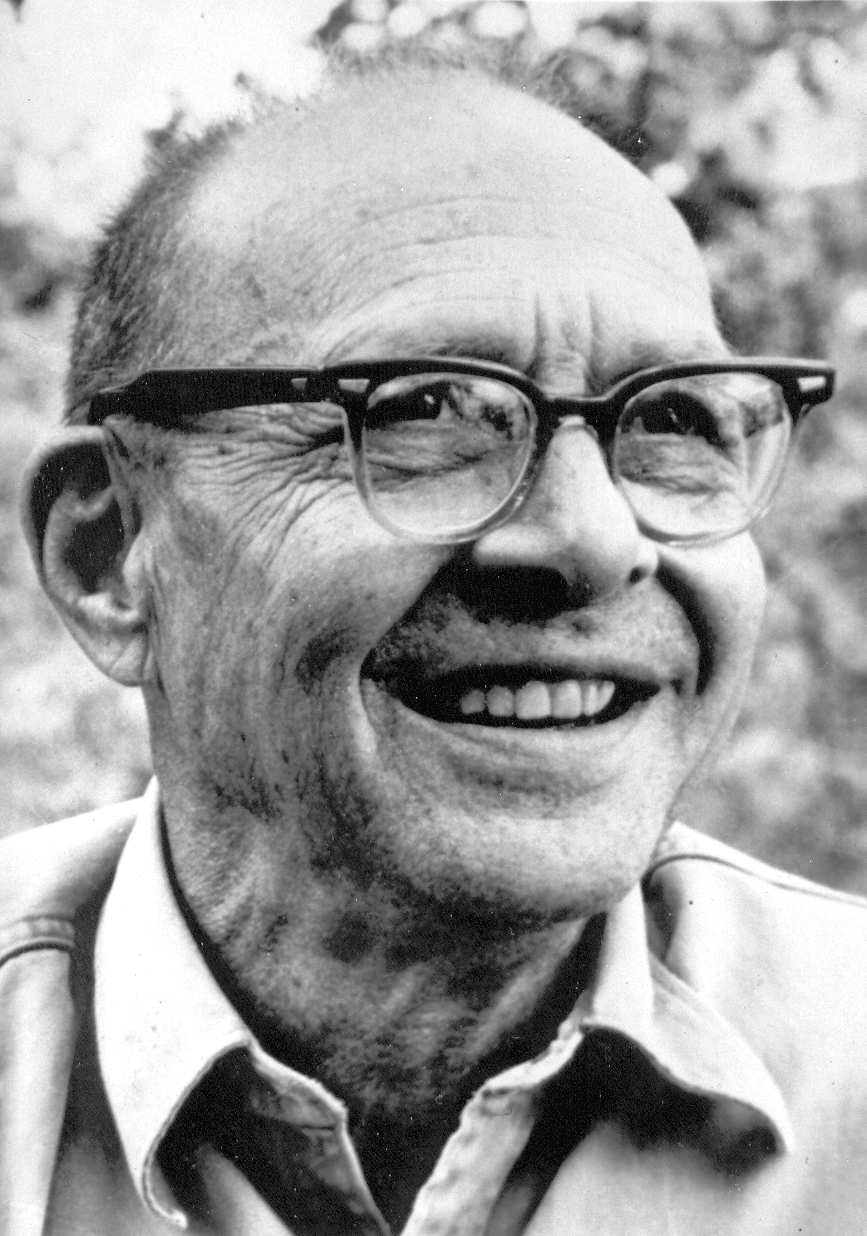
- Behn, c. 1970
- Born: September 24, 1898; McCabe, Arizona, United States
- Died: September 6, 1973 (aged 74); Seville, Spain
- Education: Harvard University
- Spouse: Alice Lawrence (m. 1905)
- Children: 3

Harry Behn (September 24, 1898 – September 6, 1973) was an American screenwriter.

He was involved in writing scenes and continuities for a number of screenplays, including the war film The Big Parade in 1925, and Hell's Angels. He graduated from Harvard University in 1922. Behn retired from screenwriting in the 1930s; he worked as a creative writing professor at the University of Arizona from 1938 to 1947 and co-founded the University of Arizona Press; he would later move to Connecticut and transition to children's literature. He died in Seville in 1973 during a trip. His son, Peter Behn was cast as young Thumper in the film Bambi.

== Filmography ==
- The Big Parade (1925)
- Proud Flesh (1925), with Agnes Christine Johnson
- La Bohème (1926), with Ray Doyle
- The Crowd (1928), with King Vidor and John V.A. Weaver
- The Racket (1928), with Del Andrews
- Frozen River (1929)
- Sin Sister (1929), with Andrew Bennison
- Hell's Angels (1930), with Howard Estabrook
- Secret of the Chateau (1934), with Richard Thorpe

== Bibliography ==
- Siesta (poetry), Golden Bough, 1937
- All Kinds of Time, Harcourt, 1950.
- Rhymes of the Times, under the pen name Jim Hill, published privately, 1950.
- Windy Morning, Harcourt, 1953.
- The House beyond the Meadow, Pantheon, 1955.
- The Wizard in the Well, Harcourt, 1956.
- Chinese Proverbs from Olden Times, Peter Pauper, 1956.
- (Translator and illustrator) Rainer Maria Rilke, Duino Elegies, Peter Pauper, 1957.
- The Painted Cave, Harcourt, 1957.
- Timmy's Search, Seabury, 1958.
- The Two Uncles of Pablo, Harcourt, 1959.
- (Translator) 300 Classic Haiku, Peter Pauper, 1962.
- (Translator, along with Peter Beilenson) Haiku Harvest: Japanese haiku. Series IV, Peter Pauper, 1962.
- The Faraway Lurs, World Publishing, 1963.
- (Translator) Cricket Songs: Japanese haiku, Harcourt, 1964.
- Omen of the Birds, World Publishing, 1964.
- The Golden Hive, Harcourt, 1957–1966.
- Chrysalis: Concerning Children and Poetry, Harcourt, 1949–1968.
- What a Beautiful Noise, World Publishing, 1970.
- (Translator) More Cricket Songs: Japanese haiku, Harcourt, 1971.
- Crickets and Bullfrogs and Whispers of Thunder: Poems and Pictures, edited by Lee Bennett Hopkins, Harcourt, 1949–1984.
- Trees: A Poem, illustrated by James Endicott, H. Holt (New York, NY), 1992.
- Halloween, illustrated by Greg Couch, north–south (New York, NY), 2003.
- The kite (Missing date).

Behn's translations of haiku provided the texts for two works by Norman Dinerstein:

- Cricket Songs for unison children's chorus and piano (1967)
- Frogs for SATB chorus (1977)
