= Eugène Fichot =

French hydrographer (1867–1939)

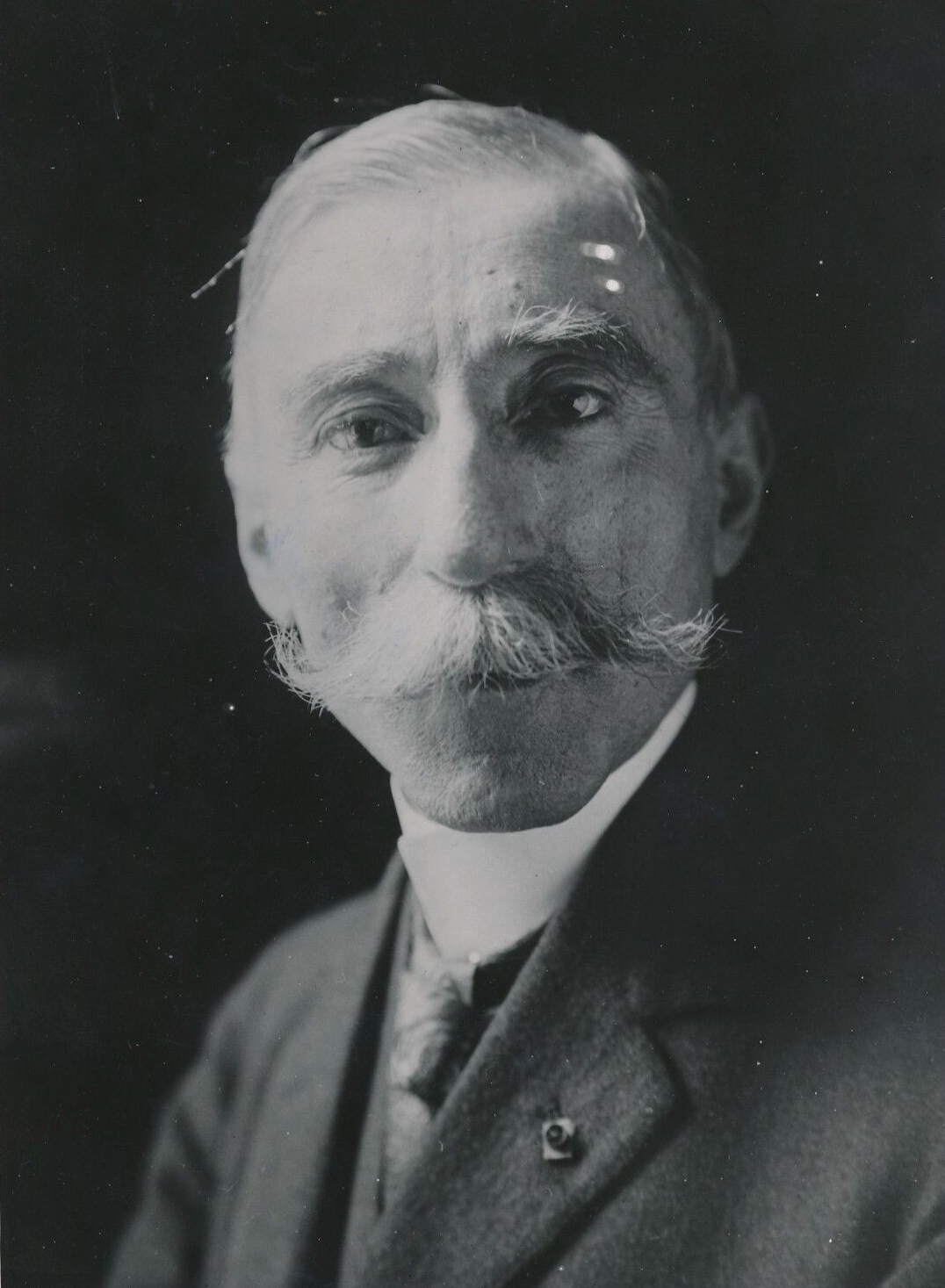
c. 1928

Lazare-Eugène Fichot (French: [lazaʁ øʒɛn fiʃo]; 18 January 1867 – 17 July 1939) was a French marine hydrographer, geodesist, and engineer who also examined theoretical aspects of oceanic tides for use in their prediction and wrote a Théorie des marées in collaboration with Henri Poincaré.

Fichot was born in Le Creusot to Marie Marguerite Martin and Louis Fichot. He was educated at the École Monge before going to the École polytechnique and after graduating in 1886, joined the corps of hydrographic engineers. He was involved in marine surveys in the English Channel, Madagascar, Reunion, and Indochina (Off Vietnam and Cambodia, then French colonies). In 1912 he received the Binoux Award for his contributions to geodesy, the study of tides and planetary rotation. From 1921 he taught geodesy and astronomy at the École polytechnique. He became Ingénieur Général in 1924 and headed the Marine Hydrographic Service in 1926. He was elected to the French Academy of Sciences in 1925, made officer of the Legion of Honor in 1911, and Grand Officer of the Legion of Honor in 1931. He was working on a treatise on the theory of tides which was only partly published posthumously. He examined tidal theory and especially the dynamics of Amphidromic points.

Fichot retired in 1932. He was married to Aline Chauvet and died at his home in Château Sentout, Tabanac.
