= Norman Dinerstein =

American classical composer

Norman Myron Dinerstein (September 18, 1937 – December 23, 1982) was an American composer and pedagogue.

== Life and career ==
A native of Springfield, Massachusetts, Dinerstein received his bachelor's degree in music from Boston University in 1960; this was followed by a master's in music from the Hartt College of Music in 1963, and a Ph.D. from Princeton University in 1974. He also studied at the Hochschule für Musik Berlin (1926–63); the Berkshire Music Center (1962 and 1963); and the Darmstadt Summer School (1964). He considered Arnold Franchetti to be his most important instructor; others under whom he studied included Witold Lutosławski, Gunther Schuller, Aaron Copland, Lukas Foss, Roger Sessions, and Milton Babbitt. From 1965 to 1966 he taught at Princeton University; he was on the faculty of the New England Conservatory from 1968 to 1969 and again from 1970 until 1971; he was chairman of composition and theory at Hartt College from 1971 until 1976, and from 1976 until 1981 held the chairmanship of composition, musicology, and theory at the University of Cincinnati College-Conservatory of Music. In the latter year he became dean, holding the position until his death. He was a Fulbright Scholar in Argentina from 1969 until 1970. Among his pupils was Thomas L. McKinley. Dinerstein was married to soprano Nelga Lynn Dinerstein, with whom he had two sons, Jonathan and Alexander; all three survived him. He died in his home in Cincinnati, and is interred in the Adath Israel Cemetery in Price Hill, Cincinnati.

Early in his career Dinerstein produced music that was mainly tonal and lyrical. Coming under the influence of his teacher Franchetti, he began in 1961 to compose in a freely atonal and dissonant style; a notable work in this vein is the 1971 Refrains for orchestra. Later in his career he returned to tonality in his music; pieces exemplifying this change include Zalmen for violin (1975); Songs of Remembrance for soprano and strings (1976-1979), a commission to celebrate the bicentennial of the United States; and Hashkivenu for tenor, chorus, and double bass (1981). All are among his works on Jewish themes. By the end of his career Dinerstein was continuing to simplify his technique, evident in such works as Golden Bells for chorus and orchestra, the second movement of a planned four-movement setting of "The Bells" by Edgar Allan Poe. This work was completed posthumously by Michael Schelle, and was premiered by the Cincinnati Symphony Orchestra under Michael Gielen. Composers cited as an influence on Dinerstein's choral music include Igor Stravinsky and Arnold Schoenberg.

== Works ==
Adapted from:

=== Orchestral ===
- Cassation (1963)
- Intermezzo (1964)
- 3 miniatures for strings (1966)
- Contrasto (1968)
- Refains (1971)
- The Answered Question for wind ensemble (1972)

=== Choral and vocal ===
- 4 Settings (Emily Dickinson) for soprano and string quartet (1961)
- Schir ha Schirim (Bible) for chorus and orchestra (1963)
- Cricket Songs (Japanese haiku, translated Harry Behn) for unison children's chorus and piano (1967)
- Herrickana (Robert Herrick) for SATB chorus (1972)
- Poema ultrasonico (E. G. de Espinola) for SATB chorus (1974)
- When David Heard (Bible) for SATB chorus (1975)
- Songs of Remembrance (Yiddish, translated Joseph Leftwich) for soprano and strings (1976-1979)
- Frogs (Japanese haiku, translated Harry Behn) for SATB chorus (1977)
- Love Songs (Elizabeth Barrett Browning, Robert Browning, Christina Rossetti, Song of Songs), song cycle (1980)
- Golden Bells (Edgar Allan Poe) for chorus and orchestra (1980-1982) (completed by Michael Schelle)
- Hashkiveinu for tenor, chorus, and double-bass

Four other song cycles, five other works for unaccompanied chorus

=== Chamber and instrumental ===
- 4 Movements for 3 Woodwind for flute, clarinet, and bassoon (1961)
- Terzetto for bass trio (1961)
- Tizmoret Katan for violin and cello (1961)
- 3 Wiegenlieder for piano (1961)
- Satz for flute (1963)
- Serenade for oboe, clarinet, harp, violin, and cello (1963)
- Pezzi piccoli for flute and viola (1966)
- Pezzicati for double-bass (1967, revised 1978)
- Short Suite for Young Players for flute, clarinet, alto saxophone, horn, trumpet, violin, and viola (1967)
- Sequoia for jazz ensemble (1969)
- Faster than a Rag for piano (1974)
- Aeolus for organ (1975)
- Zalmen, or The Madness of God, for violin (1975)
- Tubajubalee for tuba ensemble (1978)
