= Prosper-Didier Deshayes =

French composer

Prosper-Didier Deshayes (mid 18th century – 1815) was an opera composer and dancer who lived and worked in France. In 1764 he was a balletmaster at the Comédie-Française. By 1774 he had become an assistant (adjoint) at the Paris Opéra. His first opera Le Faux serment ou La Matrone de Gonesse, a comédie mêlée d'ariettes in two acts, was first performed on 31 December 1785 at the Théâtre des Beaujolais in Paris and became a popular success. He went on to have another 18 works performed at various venues in Paris, but only two, La faut serment and Zélie, ou Le mari à deux femmes, a 3-act drame first performed at the Salle Louvois on 29 October 1791, were ever published as musical scores. He also participated in the collaborative Revolutionary opera Le congrès des rois, a 3-act comédie mêlée d'ariettes, which combined music written by Deshayes and 11 other composers and was first performed by the Opéra-Comique at the Salle Favart on 26 February 1794. He died in Paris.

== Sources ==
- Sadie, Stanley, ed. (1992). The New Grove Dictionary of Opera (4 volumes). London: Macmillan. ISBN 978-1-56159-228-9.
- Wild, Nicole; Charlton, David (2005). Théâtre de l'Opéra-Comique Paris: répertoire 1762-1972. Sprimont, Belgium: Editions Mardaga. ISBN 978-2-87009-898-1.
