= Giresse =

Giresse is a French surname. Notable people with the surname include:

- Alain Giresse (born 1952), French footballer and manager
- Thibault Giresse (born 1981), French footballer and manager, son of Alain
