= Suzanne le Peletier de Saint-Fargeau =

French aristocrat (1782–1829)

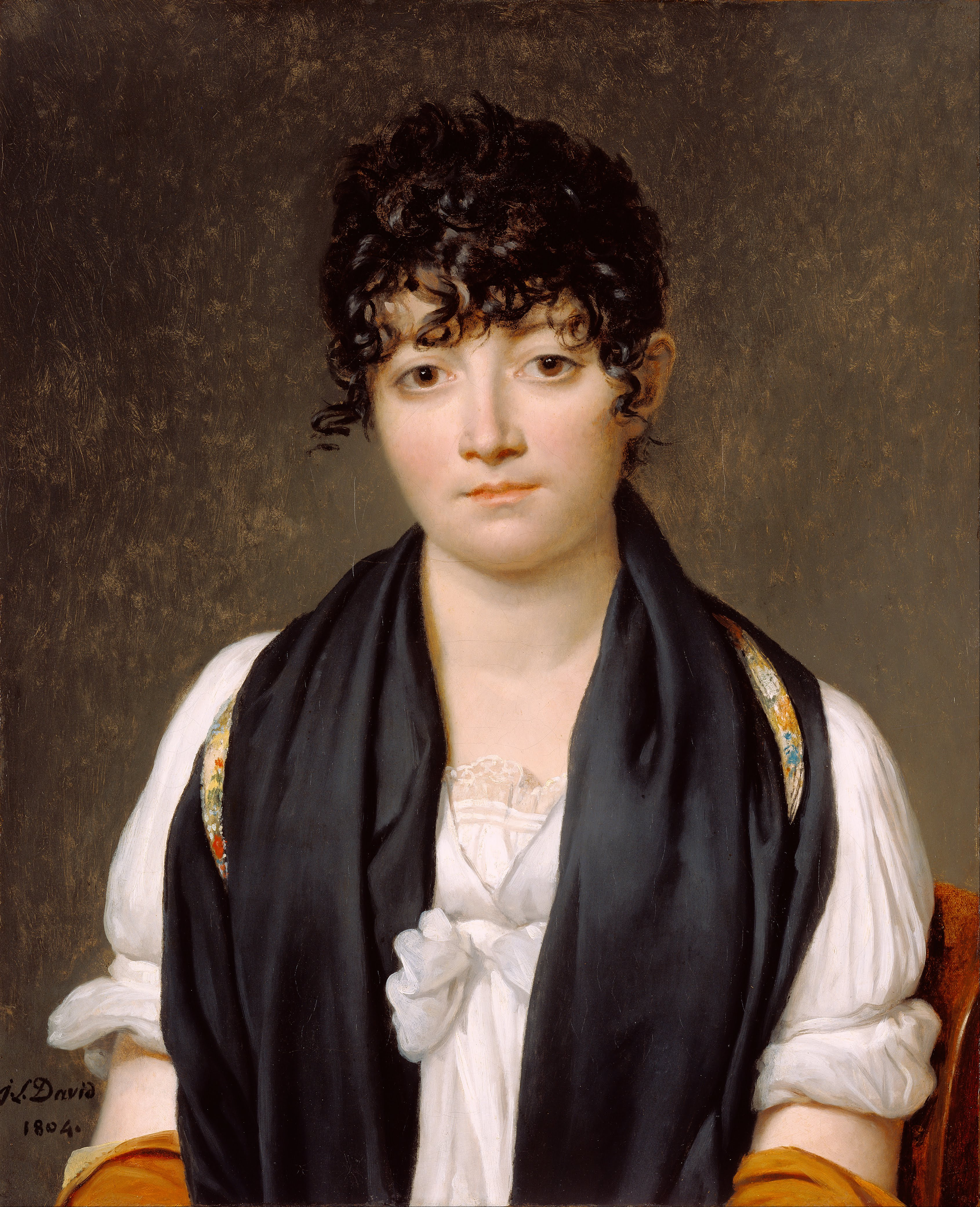
- Portrait of Suzanne Le Peletier de Saint-Fargeau by Jacques-Louis David (1804)
- Born: 1782
- Died: 1829 (aged 46–47)
- Known for: being "Daughter of the State"
- Parents: Louis-Michel le Peletier, marquis de Saint-Fargeau (father); Marie-Louise Adelaide Joly (mother)

Suzanne le Peletier (also known as Louise-Suzanne le Peletier, 1782–1829) was a French aristocrat.

== Family ==
Suzanne le Peletier de Saint-Fargeau was the daughter of Marie-Louise Adelaide Joly and Louis-Michel le Peletier, marquis de Saint-Fargeau. After the assassination of her father, she became the "Daughter of the State" and was adopted by the nation of France at the age of 11.

The writer and academician Jean d'Ormesson is descended from Suzanne le Peletier de Saint-Fargeau.

== Legal case of 1797 ==
Adoption by the state meant that she was emancipated from her uncles. Suzanne le Peletier de Saint-Fargeau wanted to marry a Dutchman called Jean-François De Witt who was debt-ridden. They were opposed to this marriage on the grounds he was not French. Due to their lack of legal power over her, they were unable to prevent her marriage. Her uncles brought their concerns to the French legislature and asked the state to fulfill its role as her father and stop le Peletier from denationalizing herself by marrying a Dutchman.

This case brought le Peletier into the public light. The public debated upon the powers of national adoption and the defining factors of family and state relations. Her engagement to a foreigner also led to public debates upon citizenship and its significance, especially for women and whether or not marriage impacts their citizenship.

Debaters upon the case brought up contradictory points. Those who supported her talked about father-centered families with a subordinate wife and children yet they stated that she did not need parental control. Instead, they supported le Peletier by emphasizing individual rights and the rationality a young woman has. Sébastien Erard, one of her supporters sent her a piano. Those who supported her uncles reminded that she was "first daughter of the republic" and that she was a symbol of being French and revolutionary. Despite that, they still spoke of her incapability of being an independent citizen of France.

== Marriage ==
Le Peletier and De Witt got married and shortly thereafter, on March 22, 1802, were granted a divorce by the justice of the peace. In 1804, she is engaged to her cousin Léon Le Peletier de Mortefontaine so Jacques-Louis David paints her portrait. In 1806, she married her cousin. They had 2 children.
