= Henry Gwiazda =

American classical composer

Henry Gwiazda (born 1952, silent i, Polish for star) is a composer who specializes in virtual audio, the simulation of a three-dimensional sound space in either headphones or precisely positioned speakers. He composes what may be called musique concrète, using samples usually without “tinker[ing]” with them.

Gwiazda is credited with sound effects, sampler, electric guitar and voice. He also composed, published, produced and engineered. Focal Point 3D Audio by Bo Gehring.

- "Gwiazda produces 'animated' audioscapes, oddly situating twisted and chopped real-sound samples . . . combining elements that don't have any clear relationship into compositions of surprising unity." - reviewed in CMJ by Robin Edgerton Douglas Wolk.

Gwiazda studied at the Eastman School of Music, and at the Hartt School (University of Hartford), where he was a student of Arnold Franchetti.

== Recordings ==
The CD noTnoTesnoTrhyThms, contains the following compositions:

1. MANEATINGCHIPSLISTENINGTOAVIOLIN (1990)
2. whErEyoulivE (1989)
3. wM (1992)
4. aftergloW (1990)
5. themythofAcceptAnce (1991), Jeffrey Krieger, electronic cello
6. thefLuteintheworLdthefLuteistheworLd (1995), virtual audio-for headphones only, Ann LaBerge, electronic flute
7. Speaker Placement Instructions
8. buzzingreynold'sdreamland (1994), virtual audio-for speakers only
9. Un Nuit Dystopia/Hommage Michel Foucault (2007)
