= Frédéric Blasius =

French violinist, clarinetist, conductor, and composer

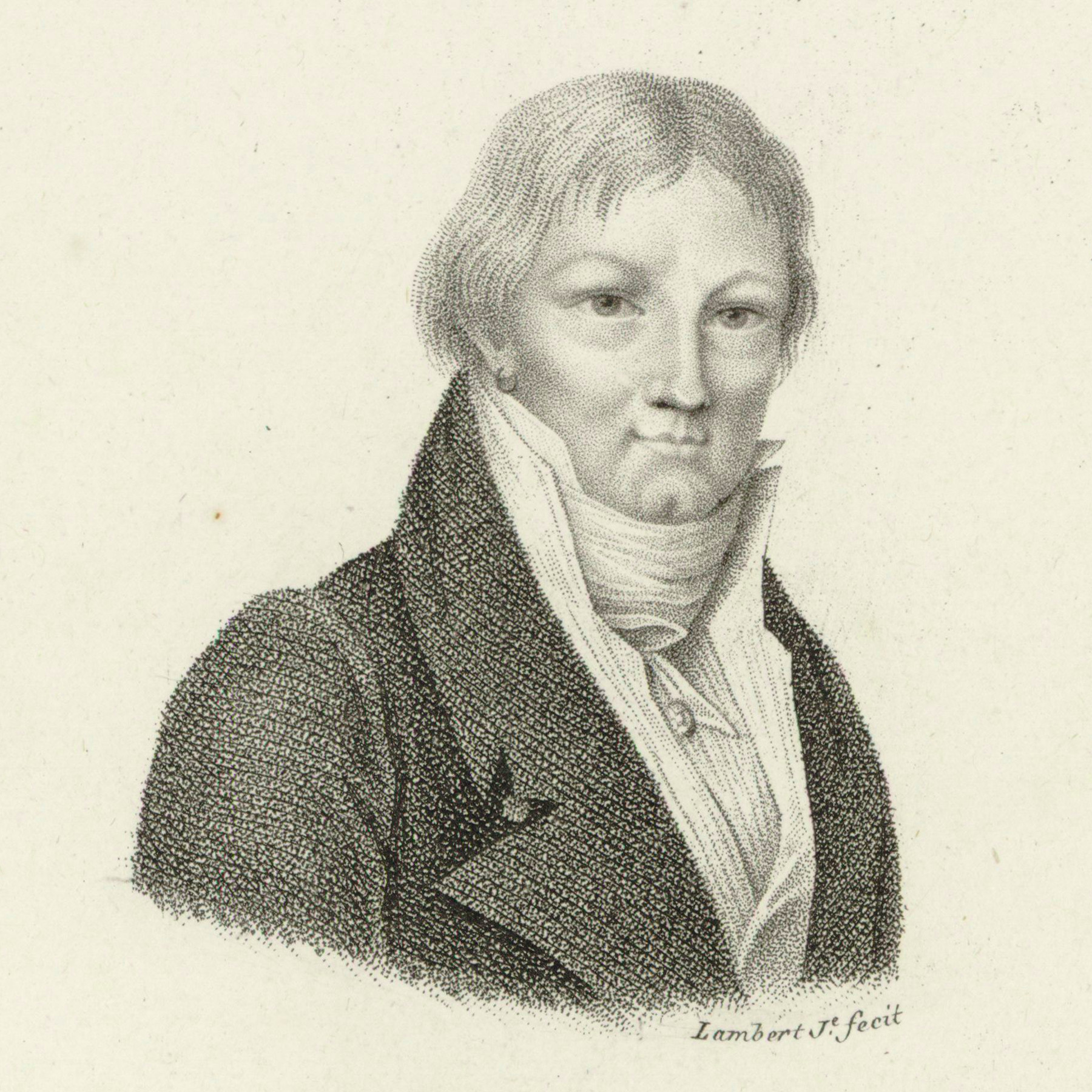
Frédéric Blasius

Frédéric Blasius (24 April 1758, in Lauterbourg – 1829, in Versailles) was a French violinist, clarinetist, conductor, and composer. Born Matthäus (French: Matthieu, Mathieu) Blasius, he used Frédéric as his pen name on his publications in Paris.

== Life and career ==
Blasius was born in Lauterbourg, a town in the far northeast corner of France on the Rhineland border of Alsace. This frontier town had been fortified in the late 17th century by Louis XIV and had a large military presence, including many musicians. Both of his parents were German. His mother, a member of the Bugard family, was originally from the South Rhineland town of Schaidt, and his father, Johann Michael Blasius, was from Rastatt in Baden. His father earned his living primarily as a master tailor, but was also a musician and gave his son his first lessons. The young Blasius also received lessons from military musicians; a man referred to as Herr Stadt; and his two older brothers: Johann Peter (French: Pierre; born Lauterbourg, 2 September 1752), a violinist; and Franz Ignaz (French: Ignace; born Lauterbourg, 11 April 1755), a bassoonist. Both of his brothers also later worked in Paris.

From 1780 to 1782 Blasius worked for the Bishop of Strasbourg, Prince Louis-René-Edouard de Rohan. The Cathedral Kapellmeister and Municipal Music Director of Strasbourg at that time was Franz Xaver Richter. Richter was a co-founder of the "Mannheim School" and a leading music theoretician. In 1784 Blasius went to Paris and in the spring made his debut as the violin soloist and conductor of one of his own concertos at a concert of the Concert spirituel. The performance received favourable reviews.

=== Opéra-Comique ===
Blasius joined the orchestra of the Opéra-Comique as a violinist in 1788, and became its concertmaster (and conductor) on 19 April 1790, a position he held up to 1801 and again from 1804 to 1816 (or 1818).

During the earlier period, from 1788 to 1801, the Opéra-Comique underwent significant challenges. Up to that time the theatre had had a virtual monopoly on the performance of French comic opera in Paris, but in 1788 Marie Antoinette gave a license to open a new theatre to her hairdresser and wig-maker, Léonard Autié. Autié sold his license to the Italian violinist Giovanni Battista Viotti, who hired Luigi Cherubini to be the director of the new company. The two men recruited actors from the provinces and singers from Italy. At first the new troupe was named the Théâtre de Monsieur after the king's brother, Louis-Stanislas-Xavier, comte de Provence, who had the court title of Monsieur, and who along with the queen promised their protection to the new group. Later, after a move from the Salle des Machines in the Tuileries Palace to the rue Feydeau, and the fall of the monarchy, it became commonly known as the Théâtre Feydeau.

Initially the Théâtre de Monsieur was forbidden to perform the same repertory as the Opéra-Comique, but this quickly changed. With the invasion of the Tuileries by a mob on 10 August 1792, the Italian singers returned to Italy, and Viotti fled to England. The Feydeau company, still under the direction of Cherubini, turned to performing French opéra comique. The competition between the two companies, forced the Opera-Comique to upgrade salaries in order to retain the best personnel. In 1794, Blasius' salary at the Opéra-Comique was increased from 2,000 livres to 2,600 livres.

An account of the year VII (1795) refers to the conductor of the Opéra-Comique as "le cit. [citoyen] Blasius", i.e., Citizen Blasius. The repertoire of the Opéra-Comique performing at the Salle Favart during these years testifies to its adherence to the values of the revolution, in contrast to its "rival and emulator", at the Feydeau, which remained true to its aristocratic origins and attracted opponents of the government. In 1793 Blasius had composed the music for a two-act trait historique by Auguste-Louis Bertin d'Antilly called Le Peletier de Saint-Fargeau, ou Le premier martyr de la République française. This piece, which was first performed by the Opéra-Comique at the Salle Favart on 23 February, was based on an event which had occurred only one month prior: Louis-Michel le Peletier, marquis de Saint-Fargeau, was assassinated on 20 January for having voted for the execution of Louis XVI, who was executed on the 21st. Early in 1794 Blasius was one of twelve composers, including Cherubini, who collaborated on a 3-act Revolutionary, patriotic comédie mêlée d'ariettes called Le congrès des rois. The composition, ordered by the Committee of Public Safety, was finished in just two days and first performed in the Salle Favart on 26 February 1794. Unfortunately, the work was not a success, and the Revolutionary purists found much to object to. After only two performances the authorities banned it altogether.

By 1801 the competition between the Opéra-Comique and the Théâtre Feydeau had reached an impasse, and it was decided to merge the two companies "by a legal act of union dated 7 thermidor an IX (26 July 1801)". The new corporation was to use the old name Opéra-Comique but perform at the newer theatre on the rue Feydeau. The merged company's first performance there was a program consisting of Étienne Méhul's Stratonice and Cherubini's Les deux journées which took place on 16 September 1801. It was in 1801 that Blasius first lost his position as conductor of the Opéra-Comique orchestra. During his time with that company Blasius had performed and conducted works by Nicolas Dalayrac, André Grétry, and Étienne Méhul, all of whom had praised his conducting skills.

=== Other work ===
Blasius next worked at other Parisian theaters, first at the Théâtre de la Cité, where in November 1801 he conducted the first Parisian performance in German of Mozart's Die Entführung aus dem Serail, with the German company of Elmenreich. Two of his own compositions, the mélodrames Adelson et Salvini and Don Pèdre et Zulika, were first performed at the Théâtre de la Gaîté in 1802. Later he worked at the Théâtre de la Porte Saint-Martin, where his Clodomire, ou La Prêtresse d'Irmunsul a three-act mélodrame was first performed on 5 May 1803.

In 1795 Blasius received an appointment as professor of violin at the newly founded Paris Conservatoire. He also held other official positions at various times during the Revolution and the Directory. He was a member and director of the National Guard Band from 1793 to 1795, and in 1799 became a conductor of the bands of the Garde Consulaire. In 1802 Blasius lost his professorship at the Conservatoire, and in 1804 he lost his position at the Garde Consulaire, but became director of the Grenadiers de la Garde de Napoléon I. Later during the reign of Louis XVIII he became director of the fifth regiment band of the Imperial Guard, and a member of the king's private orchestra. In 1816 (or 1818) he retired and went to Versailles, where he died in 1829.

== Works ==
Blasius wrote a number of works for the stage as well as instrumental pieces for Harmonie (small wind ensemble), concertos with orchestra, and chamber music with a particular emphasis on works for violin, clarinet, and bassoon. He also wrote pedagogical works for clarinet (see next) and bassoon. According to the music historian Deanne Arkus Klein, Blasius' compositions were "influenced by the foreign musicians he encountered in Strasbourg and Paris.... [His] Harmoniemusik for Revolutionary fêtes ... were especially well received [and his] string quartets in particular employ a balance of parts uncommon in France at a time when the virtuosity of the first violin was standard practice."

== Clarinet method ==
In 1796 Blasius wrote a treatise on playing clarinet (Nouvelle methode de clarinette et raisonnement des instruments) which included a fingering chart for a five-key instrument built in five sections: mouthpiece, barrel, two finger-hole sections, and stock bell. It included separate fingerings for the enharmonically equivalent notes of G♯ and A♭. Blasius also advocated using both lips to cover the upper and lower teeth, which modern players refer to as the "double-lip" embouchure: "take good care that [neither] the mouthpiece nor the reed is touched by the teeth. It is necessary to support the mouthpiece on the lower lip to cover the reed with the upper lip, without the teeth touching any of it." Clarinetists of this period typically played with the reed up, so this method avoided the teeth touching the reed. Moreover, this embouchure is normal for the double-reed instruments, oboe and bassoon, and clarinetists at the time often played these instruments as well. In fact, it is known that Blasius also mastered the bassoon and the flute.

== List of compositions ==
=== Instrumental ===
The works in this list are primarily from The New Grove Dictionary of Music and Musicians with additional sources as noted.

==== Orchestral ====
- Simphonie (1785) (music not located)
- Three Suites d'harmonie (1799–1812)
  - No. 1 in B♭
  - No. 2 in E♭
  - No. 3 in E♭
  - Note: These works were written for military and social functions. Following well established French traditions, airs and popular ballads were brought together according to key without further connections. The only organizing principles appear to have been to have a lively piece to start and end and some diversity of character between the others.
- Seven collections of pieces for wind band
- Overture, for wind instruments (1794), ed. in C. Pierre: Musique des fêtes et cérémonies (1899)
- Overture, for wind instruments (1796)

==== Concertos ====
- Three violin concertos, including:
  - Violin Concerto No. 1 in G major (1797 or 1798)
  - Violin Concerto No. 2 in A major (c1797)
  - Violin Concerto No. 3 in B♭ major (1801)
- Four clarinet concertos (1802–1805), including:
  - Clarinet Concerto No. 1 in C major
  - Clarinet Concerto No. 2
  - Clarinet Concerto No. 3
  - Clarinet Concerto No. 4
- Concerto for bassoon (after 1800)
- Sinfonia concertante for 2 horns, in E major (1795)

==== Quartets ====
===== String quartets =====
- Six Quatuors concertantes (string quartets: 2 violins, viola, and cello), Op. 3 (1780–1782)
- String quartets, Op. 10 (1785)
- Six string quartets, Op. 12 (1795)
- String quartets, Op. 19 (1795)
- Piano sonatas by Haydn, arranged for string quartet

===== Other quartets =====
- Three Quatuor concertantes for clarinet or violin I, violin II, viola and bass, Op. 1
  - No. 1 in F minor
  - No. 2 in E♭ major
  - No. 3 in B♭ major
- Three quartets for clarinet, violin, viola, and cello (1782–1784)
- Six quartets for clarinet, violin, viola, and cello, Op. 13 (1788?)
- Bassoon quartets, Op. 5 (ca. 1788)
- Quartet for clarinet, violin, viola, and cello, Op. 2 (1799)
- Overture for bassoon, violin, viola, and bass (incomplete)
- Overture for bassoon, violin, viola, and bass (c1810?)
- Six Quatuours concertants for bassoon, violin, viola, and bass, Op. 9 (1797), possibly by I. Blasius

==== Trios ====
- Three trios dialogués for clarinet, violin, and cello or bass, Op. 31
- Ten trios for 2 clarinets and bassoon, Op. 2, incomplete
- Three trios for 2 violins and cello, Op. 48
- Three trios for clarinet, horn, and cello, choisis dans les ouvrages du célèbre Michel [Yost]

==== Duets ====
- Duets (ca. 69) for 2 violins, including:
  - Op. 4
  - Six duets, Op. 8 (1783)
  - Op. 26
  - Three duets, Op. 28
  - Op. 29 (1796)
  - Op. 30 (published by Offenbach)
  - Three duets, Op. 32
    - No. 1 in G major
    - No. 2 in B♭ major
    - No. 3 in F major
  - Op. 33 (Bibliothèque nationale de France)
  - Op. 43
  - Op. 52 (ca. 1794)
  - Twelve duets, Op. 53 (ca. 1794)
- Duets (ca. 64) for two clarinets, including:
  - Op. 18 (1794)
  - Op. 20 (1794)
  - Op. 21 (1794–1796)
  - Op. 27
  - Six grands duo dialogués, Op. 35
  - Op. 38
  - Op. 39 (1797/1798?)
  - Op. 40 (1800)
  - Six duets, Op. 46
  - Six easy duets (1796), from Nouvelle méthode de clarinet
- Twelve duets for two bassoons, including:
  - Six duets, Op. 27 (1784)
  - Six duets, Op. 51
    - Nos. I, II, III
    - Nos. IV, V, VI
- Duet for violin and viola (1784?)
- Six duets for flute and violin, Op. 12 (1788)

==== Sonatas ====
- Six sonatas for piano with violin accompaniment (1783)
- Sonates (1797)
- Three sonatas for violin with cello accompaniment, Op. 40 (1800)
- Three sonatas for violin with cello accompaniment, Op. 41 (1800)
  - No. 1 in A major
  - No. 2 in B♭ major
  - No. 3 in E♭ major
- Three sonatas for violin with bass accompaniment, Op. 43 (1801)
- Six sonatinas for violin with bass accompaniment, Op. 55
  - No. 1 in D major
  - No. 2 in B♭ major
  - No. 3 in A major
  - No. 4 in C major
  - No. 5 in G major
  - No. 6 in F major
- Six sonatas for clarinet with viola or bass accompaniment, Op. 55 (1805)
- Six sonatas for bassoon with cello accompaniment, Op. 57 (ca. 1800)
- Six sonatas for flute with bass accompaniment
- Six études graduelles for flute with bass accompaniment, Op. 58
- Three grandes sonates for violin with violin accompaniment, Op. 60 (1817?)
- Six grandes sonates for violin and violin accompaniment, Op. 66
- Sonata for violin and piano (C. Pierre, ed. (1899). Musique des fêtes et cérémonies.)
- Pieces in Musique à l'usage des fêtes nationales (1794–1795) and Cartier's L'art du violon (1798)

==== Violin solo ====
- Caprices ou Étude for violin
- Preludes ou caprices for violin, dedicated to C. Lubbert

=== Stage works ===
- La paysanne supposée, ou La fête de la moisson, a 3-act comédie mêlée d'ariettes, was performed only once by the Opéra-Comique on 28 August 1788 in the Salle Favart. The opera was not well received, probably because the libretto, written by C. Dubois, was considered poor. A published score and libretto have not been found.
- L'amour hermite, a 1-act pièce anacréontique mêlée d'ariettes (piece with verse in the manner or style of Anacreon mixed with ariettas) with a libretto by P. Desriaux, was first presented on 31 January 1789 at the Théâtre des Beaujolais at the Palais-Royal. It was more successful and was published. The work is essentially a pastoral opera ballet and includes a ballet divertissement and a sleep scene, both of which were typical of the more serious operas usually presented at the Académie royale de musique.
- Prince Polastri, 1789, was mentioned in a letter from Duprat (Bibliothèque-Musée de l'Opéra, Paris).
- A ballet, composed in 1789 but unperformed, was mentioned in Biographie universelle des musiciens by François-Joseph Fétis.
- Les trois sultanes, a 3-act comédie with a libretto by Charles-Simon Favart after the comte de Marmontel, was first performed on 25 August 1792 by the Opéra-Comique in the Salle Favart. The opera was given a total of 7 times by the Opéra-Comique. The score and the libretto have not been found.
  - Nicolas Dalayrac published some orchestral material under the same title (an overture and two arias).
- Le Peletier de Saint-Fargeau, ou Le premier martyr de la République française, a 2-act trait historique with a libretto by Auguste-Louis Bertin d'Antilly, was first performed by the Opéra-Comique in the Salle Favart on 23 February 1793 [5 vent I], just a month after the historical events it dramatized. It was also called La mort de Saint-Fargeau and was given a total of four times at the Opéra-Comique. The score and the libretto have not been found.
  - Louis-Michel le Peletier, marquis de Saint-Fargeau, was assassinated on 20 January 1793 for having voted for the execution of Louis XVI. The king was executed on the 21st. The painter Jacques-Louis David supervised the funeral ceremonies for Le Peletier on 24 January and produced a painting with the title Les derniers moments de Michel Lepeletier.
- Le congrès des rois, a 3-act comédie mêlée d'ariettes with a libretto by Antoine-François Èvre, combined music written by Blasius and 11 other composers and was first performed by the Opéra-Comique in the Salle Favart on 26 February 1794 [8 vent II]. The score and the libretto have not been found. Some of the music by Henri Montan Berton has been located.
- Africo et Menzola, a 3-act mélodrame with text by Coffin-Rosny, was first performed at the Théâtre de l'Ambigu-Comique on 10 March 1798.
- Adelson et Salvini, a 3- act mélodrame with text by P. Delmarre and choreography by M. Adam, was first performed at the Théâtre de la Gaîté in 1802.
- Don Pèdre et Zulika, a mélodrame, was first performed at the Théâtre de la Gaîté in 1802. The score has not been found.
- Clodomire, ou La Prêtresse d'Irmunsul, a 3-act mélodrame with text by N. and H. Lemaire and choreography by M. Aumer, was first performed at the Théâtre de la Porte Saint-Martin on 5 May 1803.
- Fernando ou Les maures, a 3-act opera, now attributed to Joseph Wölffl, with a libretto by De Bussy, was performed once by the Opéra-Comique on 11 February 1805 [22 pluv XIII] in the Salle Favart. The score and the libretto have not been found. The title was recorded as Fernand ou Les maures in Magasin Encyclopédique: "It is an imitation of L'engant de la forêt by Guilbert de Pixérécourt".

=== Other vocal works ===
- Vive l'amour et la folie, couplets with text by C. Grenier (1795)
- Française, point de vengeance, couplets (1814)
- Messe for alto, tenor, baritone, bass voices and wind instruments

=== Theoretical works ===
- Méthode de clarinette (c1795), has not been located
- Nouvelle méthode de clarinette et raisonnement des instruments, principes et théorie de musique dédiés aux élèves du Conservatoire (1796)
- Méthode du basson (1800)

== Recordings ==
- Harmoniemusik (Music for winds)
  - Includes:
    - François Henri Joseph Castil-Blaze: Sextet no. 1 in E♭ major
    - Carl Maria von Weber: Adagio and rondo
    - Matthieu-Frédéric Blasius: Suite d'harmonie no. 1–3
  - Performers: Charles Neidich, clarinet; Mozzafiato (music group)
  - Program notes: David Montgomery and Charles Neidich, in English with German and French translations
  - Label: Sony Classical, SK68263 (1996).
- Clarinet Concertos by The Mannheim School
  - Includes:
    - Matthäus Frederic Blasius: Clarinet Concerto No. 1 in C Major
    - Six clarinet concertos by Carl Philipp Stamitz
    - Other works for solo clarinet and orchestra by:
      - Franz Anton Dimmler
      - Joseph Fiala
      - Johann Sebastian Demar
      - Georg Friedrich Fuchs
      - Franz Wilhelm Tausch
      - Peter von Winter
  - Performers:
    - Karl Schlechta, clarinet and basset horn
    - Kurpfälzisches Kammerorchester; Jiří Malát, conductor
  - Label: Arte Nova 74321 37327 2 (5 CDs: 70:55, 62:30, 62:53, 62:03, 67:39)
- Music from France
  - Includes:
    - Darius Milhaud: Suite for violin, clarinet, and piano, Op. 157b
    - Philippe Manoury: Michigan Trio
    - Camille Saint-Saëns: Tarantella, originally for flute, clarinet and orchestra in A minor, Op. 6
    - Frédéric Blasius: Trio Dialogues, Op. 31 No. 1, originally for clarinet, violin, and cello or bass
    - Betsy Jolas: Trio sopra et sola Facta
    - Francis Poulenc: Suite from L'invitation au château
  - Performers: Verdehr Trio (Elsa Ludewig-Verdehr, clarinet; Walter Verdehr, violin; Silvia Roederer, piano)
  - Label: Dux 0525 (2005)

== Bibliography ==
- Blasius, Frédéric (ca. 1796). Nouvelle méthode de clarinette. Paris: Porthaux. Reprint (1972), Geneva: Minkoff. OCLC 827562, 271088387.
- Hemmings, F. W. J. (1994). Theatre and State in France, 1760–1905. Cambridge: Cambridge University Press. ISBN 978-0-521-45088-1.
- Hoeprich, Eric (2008). The Clarinet. New Haven, Connecticut: Yale University Press. ISBN 978-0-300-10282-6.
- Jackman, Luc Alain (2005). Early clarinet performance as described by modern specialists, with a performance edition of Mathieu Fré́dé́ric Blasius's IIe Concerto de clarinette (thesis/dissertation: microfilm). Greensboro, North Carolina: University of North Carolina at Greensboro. OCLC 71227227.
- Koch, Hans Oskar (2002). Mannheimer Schule [The Mannheim School]. Booklet with CD: Arte Nova 74321 37327 2.
- Lamneck, Esther (1980). A survey of the music for two clarinets, published ca. 1780-1825, by the clarinetist-composers Blasius, Lefèvre, Michel, and Vanderhagen, Thesis (D.M.A.), Juilliard School. OCLC 46311427.
- McCormick, Louise Cathy (1983). Mathieu-Frédéric Blasius (1758–1829): a biographical sketch, catalog of works, and critical performance edition of the Quatuor Concertant in F, OP. 1, no. 1 (Ph. D. thesis, microfilm). Michigan State University. Dept. of Music. OCLC 11093271.
- Menkin, William (1980). Frédéric Blasius Nouvelle méthode de clarinette et raisonnement des instruments: a complete translation and analysis with an historical and biographical background of the composer and his compositions for the clarinet (D.M.A. project, photocopy). Stanford, California: Stanford University, Department of Music. OCLC 38611437. Stanford online record.
- Ostermeyer, Robert (ca. 2007). Robert Ostermeyer Musikedition - Blasius, Frederic-Matthieu - Symphonie concertante for 2 Horns (includes a short biography of the composer). Date is based on when the "Blasius page-link appears". Archived from the original on August 21, 2007..
- Pitou, Spire (1983). The Paris Opéra: an encyclopedia of operas, ballets, composers, and performers (3 volumes). Westport, Connecticut: Greenwood Press. ISBN 978-0-686-46036-7.
- Pougin, Arthur (1891). L'Opéra-Comique pendant la Révolution de 1788 à 1801: d'après des documents inédits et les sources les plus authentiques. Paris: Albert Savine. View at Google Books.
- Rice, Albert (2003). The clarinet in the classical period. Oxford: Oxford University Press. ISBN 978-0-19-534299-4.
- Sadie, Stanley, ed. (1992). The new Grove dictionary of opera (4 volumes). London: Macmillan. ISBN 978-1-56159-228-9.
- Sadie, Stanley, ed.; John Tyrell; exec. ed. (2001). The new Grove dictionary of music and musicians, 2nd ed. London: Macmillan. ISBN 978-1-56159-239-5 (hardcover). OCLC 419285866 (eBook).
- Wild, Nicole ([1989]). Dictionnaire des théâtres parisiens au XIXe siècle: les théâtres et la musique. Paris: Aux Amateurs de livres. ISBN 9780828825863. ISBN 9782905053800 (paperback). View formats and editions at WorldCat.
- Wild, Nicole; Charlton, David (2005). Théâtre de l'Opéra-Comique Paris: répertoire 1762-1972. Sprimont, Belgium: Editions Mardaga. ISBN 978-2-87009-898-1.
- Winther, Rodney (2004). An annotated guide to wind chamber music for six to eighteen players. Alfred Music Publishing. ISBN 978-0-7579-2401-9. Limited view at Google Books.
