= Monique Pelletier (skier) =

American alpine skier (born 1969)

Personal information
- Born: 12 July 1969 (age 57) Aspen, United States

Skiing career
- Sport: Alpine skiing
- Retired: 1996
- Disciplines: Technical events
- World Cup debut: 1987

Olympics
- Teams: 2

World Cup
- Seasons: 8

Monique Pelletier (born July 12, 1969) is an American former alpine skier who competed in the 1992 Winter Olympics and 1994 Winter Olympics.

== World Cup results ==
Top 10

Date	Place	Discipline	Rank
19-12-1993	(Austria) St. Anton	Slalom	5
06-03-1988	(United States) Aspen	Slalom	9
