= Joel Pelletier =

American painter, musician, actor, luthier

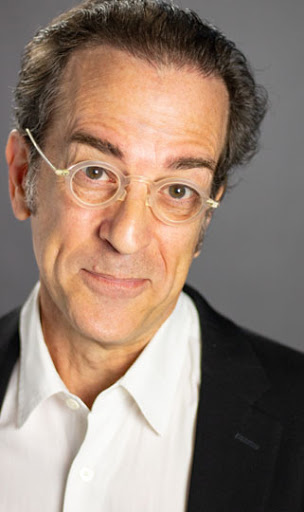
- Born: 1961 (age 64–65); Massachusetts, United States
- Known for: Painting, Music, Acting, Luthier

Joel Pelletier (born 1961) is an American contemporary musician, actor, luthier, painter, and political commentator. He is known for his version of Ensor's Christ's Entry Into Brussels in 1889.

== Life ==
Born in Massachusetts, Pelletier received a degree in music composition from the Hartt School of Music, University of Hartford.

== Music ==
Residing in Los Angeles since 1988, he has been active as a musician, actor, luthier/instrument builder and songwriter, performing his original chamber pop music, and playing mostly electric bass guitar. Since 2006 he has specialized in live classic rock performing, including tribute bands recreating Led Zeppelin bassist/keyboardist John Paul Jones in bands including No Quarter Zeppelin Live Mr. Jimmy LA Zeppelin and others (featured in the website johnpaujoel.com); recreating The Who as bassist John Entwistle; and in San Jose's Journey Unauthorized performing Journey music on keyboards. He also records and performs as pianist with The Lush Pop Trio.

== Works ==
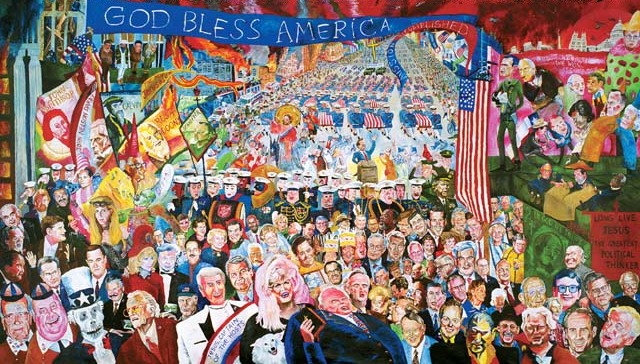
American Fundamentalists: Christ’s Entry into Washington in 2008

In 2004, Pelletier created a modern-day version of James Ensor's Christ's Entry Into Brussels in 1889 called American Fundamentalists: Christ’s Entry into Washington in 2008. Pelletier’s work adapts and expands Ensor's mockery of government, religious and business leaders, recasting the return of Jesus based on modern biblical interpretations of the late 20th century American Christian Fundamentalist and Christian Dominionist movements, especially of Left Behind author and activist Tim LaHaye. The work has been displayed throughout the United States and Europe, usually accompanied by presentations by and discussion with the artist.

Painting by Joel Pelletier, 2013 Acrylic on Canvas 49.5" x 78"

His 2013 painting Dreaming With Orson, recreates French Painter Henri Rousseau's 1897 painting The Sleeping Gypsy updated with himself and one of his Irish Wolfhounds as subjects of the painting.

== American fundamentalist movement ==
Pelletier has written a manifesto that comments on American fundamentalism. Religion, politics, economy, and corporations are discussed.
