= Louis-Michel le Peletier, marquis de Saint-Fargeau =

French politician (1760–1793)

Louis-Michel le Peletier
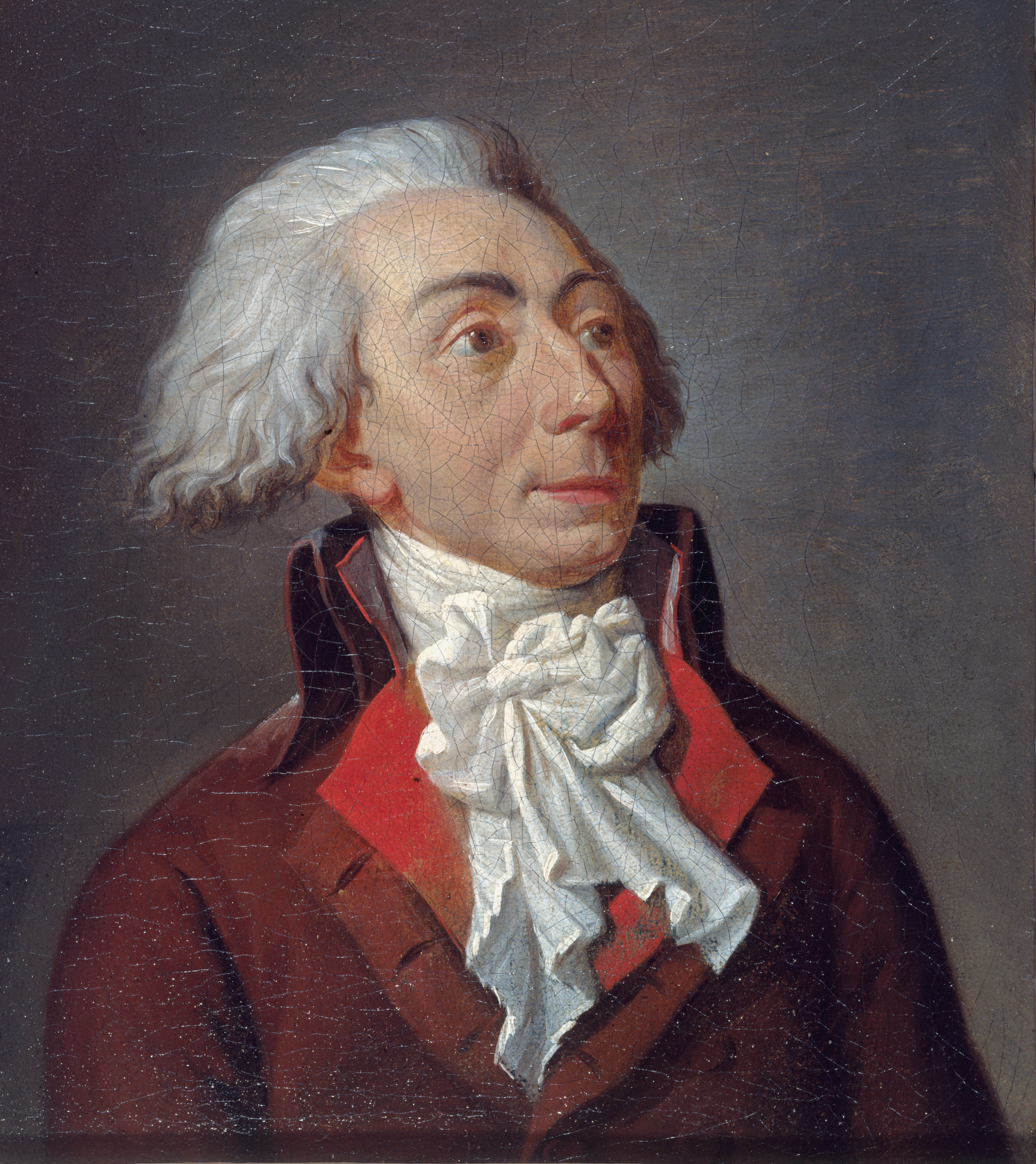
- Portrait by Jean-François Garneray

National Convention for Yonne
- In office 20 September 1792 – 20 January 1793
- Succeeded by: Alexandre Edmé Pierre Villetard

Member of the National Constituent Assembly
- In office 9 July 1789 – 5 July 1790
- Constituency: Paris

Member of the Estates-General for Nobility
- In office 16 May 1789 – 9 July 1789
- Constituency: Paris

Personal details
- Born: 29 May 1760 Paris, France
- Died: 20 January 1793 (aged 32) Paris, France
- Resting place: Château de Saint-Fargeau, Burgundy, France
- Party: The Mountain
- Spouse: Marie-Louise Adelaide Joly
- Children: Suzanne le Peletier de Saint-Fargeau
- Profession: Lawyer, magistrate
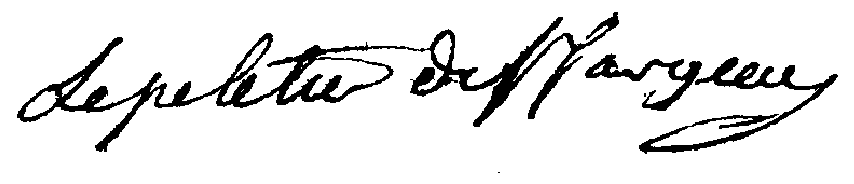
- Signature

Louis-Michel le Peletier, Marquis of Saint-Fargeau (French pronunciation: [lwi miʃɛl lə pɛltje]; sometimes spelled Lepeletier; 29 May 1760 – 20 January 1793) was a French politician, nobleman, Freemason and martyr of the French Revolution.

== Career ==
Born in Paris, he belonged to a well-known family, his great-grandfather, Michel Robert Le Peletier des Forts, count of Saint-Fargeau, having been Controller-General of Finances. After the death of his title-holding family, Le Peletier gained a vast amount of wealth.

Le Peletier entered into politics by becoming a lawyer ("avocat") in the employ of the Place du Châtelet, a prison. In 1785 he was advanced to avocat-general. In 1789 he was elected to the Parlement of Paris, and in that same year he became a deputy of the nobility to the States-General.

Initially, he shared the conservative views of the majority of his class, but by degrees his ideas changed and became increasingly radical. On 13 July 1789 he demanded the recall of Necker, whose dismissal by the king had aroused great excitement in Paris. In the Constituent Assembly he moved the abolition of the death penalty, of the galleys and of branding, and the substitution of beheading for hanging. This attitude won him great popularity, and on 21 June 1790 he was made president of the Constituent Assembly. He remained in this position until 5 July 1790.

During the existence of the Legislative Assembly, he was elected President of the General Council for the Yonne département in 1791. He was then elected by this département to become a deputy to the National Convention. Here he was in favor of the trial of Louis XVI by the Assembly and was one of the deciding votes for the death of the king.

== Educational reform ==
While in the Convention, Le Peletier focused mainly on revolutionary reform of education, promoting a Spartan education. It called for both males and females to be taught in state-run schools and taught revolutionary ideas instead of the customary history, science, mathematics, language and religion. His educational plan was supported by Robespierre and his ideas were borrowed in later schemes, notably by Jules Ferry.

== Death and later honors ==
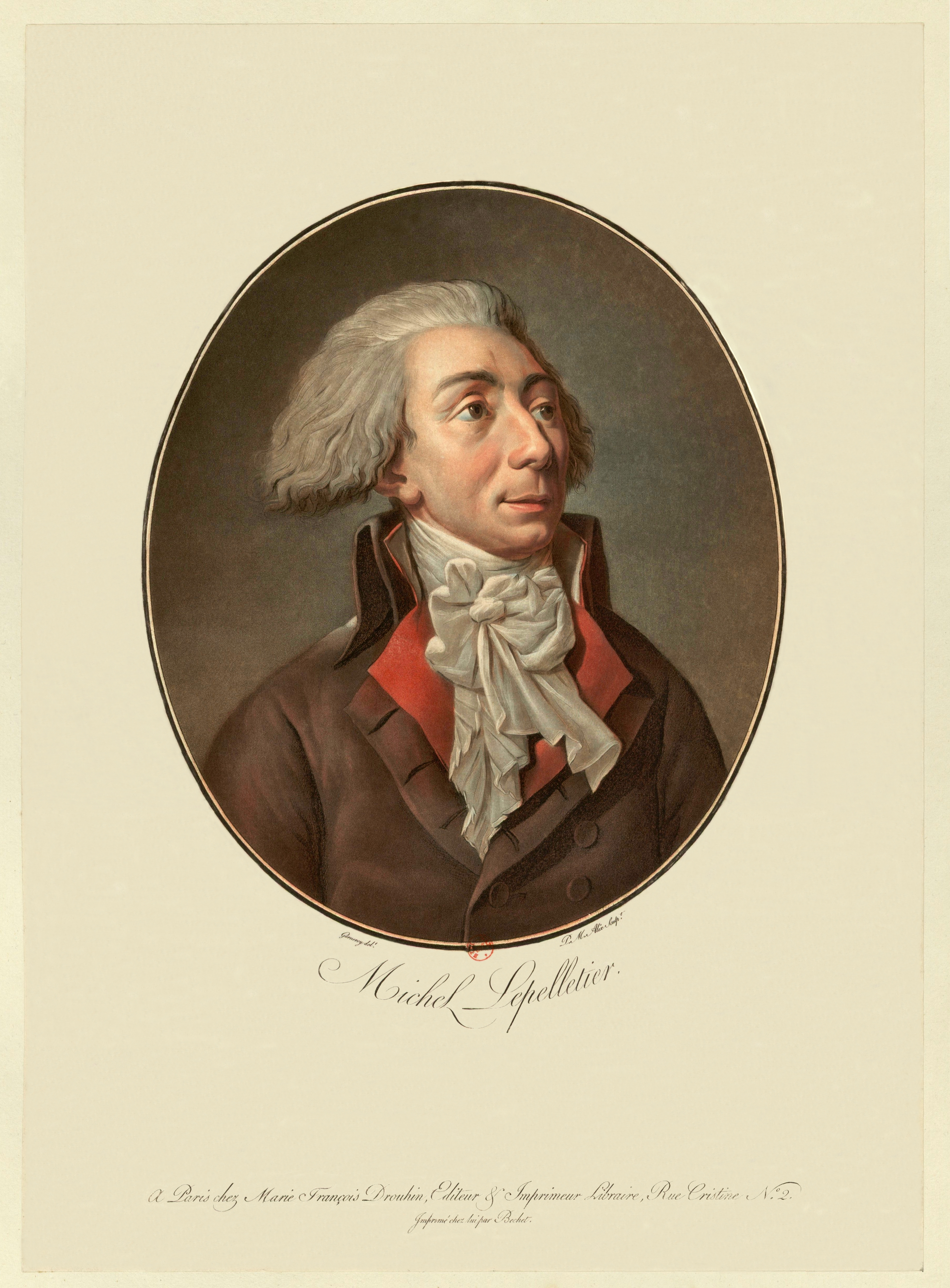
Louis-Michel Lepeletier de Saint-Fargeau, by Garneray, engraved by Alix

On 20 January 1793, the eve of the king's execution, Le Peletier was assassinated in a restaurant in the Palais Royal. His murderer, Philippe Nicolas Marie de Pâris, a member of the Garde du Corps, entered the restaurant, approached Le Peletier, and said "You voted for the King's death, Mr. Le Peletier?" Le Peletier replied, saying "I voted according to my conscience. What has that to do with you?" Pâris proceeded to plunge a saber that he had hidden under his cloak into Le Peletier's chest. Pâris was able to leave the restaurant with no resistance from its patrons. Pâris fled to Normandy, where, on the point of being discovered, he supposedly shot himself in the head.

The Convention honored Louis Michel Le Peletier with a magnificent funeral. His body was displayed in the Place Vendôme beneath the statue of King Louis XIV. Le Peletier was buried in the Panthéon in Paris in 1793. His body was removed by his family on 14 February 1795. Just a month after the assassination, on 23 February 1793, the Opéra-Comique presented the first of four performances of a musical treatment of his life and death called Le Peletier de Saint-Fargeau, ou Le premier martyr de la République française, with a libretto by Auguste-Louis Bertin d'Antilly and music by Frédéric Blasius.

The station Saint-Fargeau of the Paris Metro is named for him. A Sèvres biscuit porcelain bust of Louis Michel Le Peletier is on display in the Château de Vizille, Isère. On 30 September 1793 the French Navy's ship Séduisant, one of two newly commissioned ships, with 74 guns, over 56 meters in length and 1550 tons in weight, was renamed Peletier. On 30 May 1795, the ship reverted to her original name Séduisant.

== Painting by David ==
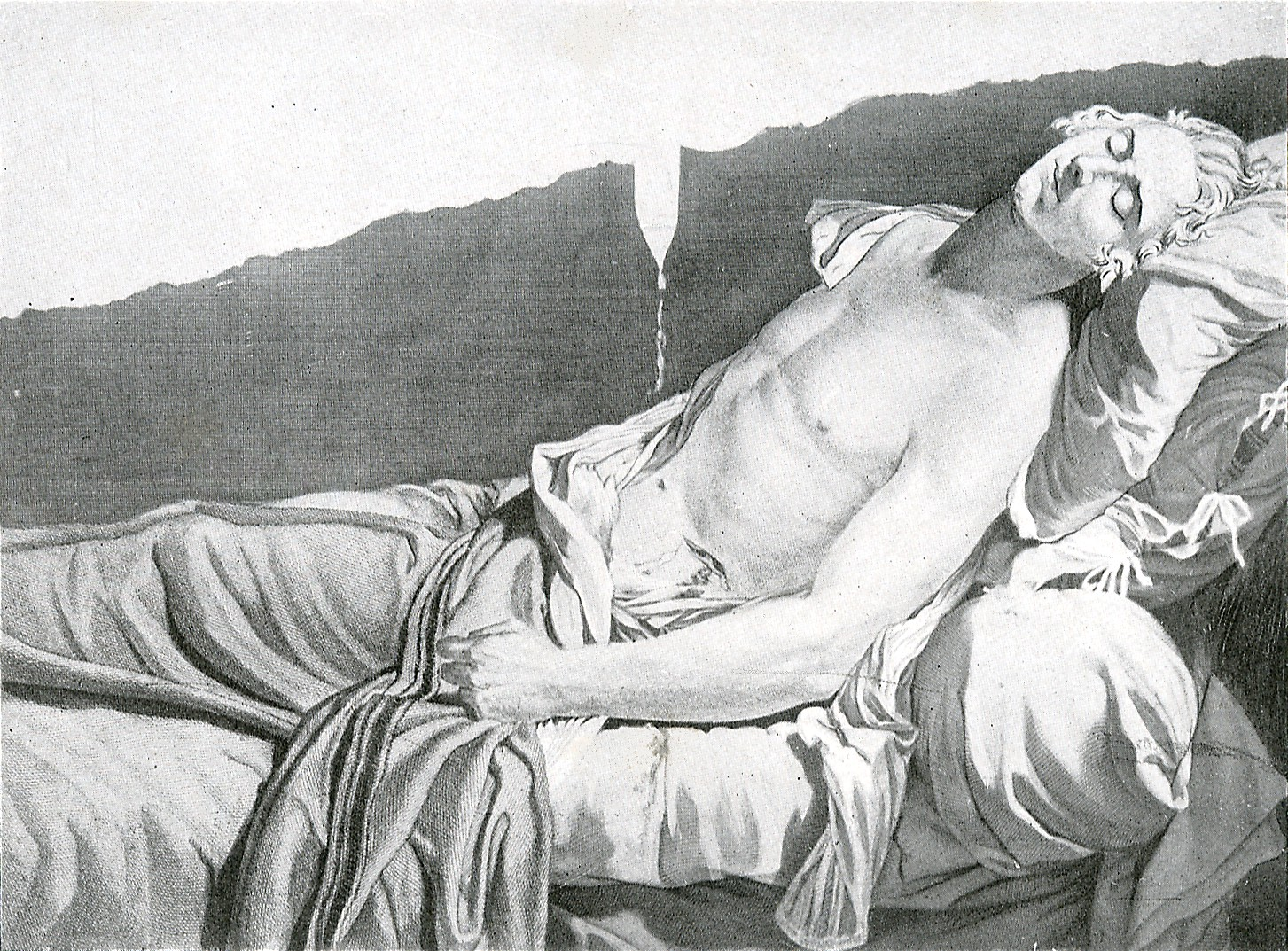
Les derniers moments de Michel Lepeletier, an engraving by Anatole Desvoge after the painting by Jacques-Louis David

The painter Jacques-Louis David represented his death in a famous painting, Les Derniers moments de Michel Lepeletier or Lepelletier de Saint-Fargeau sur son lit de mort. David described his painting of Le Peletier's face as "Serene, that is because when one dies for one's country, one has nothing with which to reproach oneself." This painting, known only through a drawing made by a pupil of David, is considered by scholars the first official painting of the French Revolution, a rehearsal for David's later achievement The Death of Marat.

== Family ==
Le Peletier had a brother, Felix (1769–1837), well known for his advanced ideas, and a brother Amédée Louis Michel le Peletier, comte de Saint-Fargeau (1770–1845), a noted entomologist. The writer and academician Jean d'Ormesson was descended from his daughter Suzanne le Peletier de Saint-Fargeau and her descendants owned the famous Château de Saint-Fargeau until 1960s.

== In popular culture ==
Le Peletier appears as an antagonist in Assassin's Creed Unity, where he is depicted as a secret member of the Templar Order under Grand Master Francois-Thomas Germain who believes that he is doing what is right for France before what is right for the Templars. He is assassinated by the protagonist Arno Dorian in the Palais-Royale after he votes to have the king executed.

== General sources ==
- Andress, David, The Terror: The Merciless War for Freedom in Revolutionary France, New York, Straus and Giroux, 2005
- Déy, M., Histoire de la Ville et du Comté de Saint-Fargeau, Auxerre, 1856
- Hazeltine, Mayo Williamson, French Revolution: A Study of Democracy, London, Kessinger Publishing, 2003
- Herissay, Jacques, L'assassinat de Le Pelletier de Saint-Fargeau, Paris, Ed. Emile-Paul Frères, 1934
- Le Blant, Edmond, Lepeletier de Saint-Fargeau et son meurtrier, Paris, Douniol, 1874
- Lewis, Gwynne, The French Revolution Rethinking Debate, N.P. Routledge, 1993
- Martucci, Roberto, En attendant Le Peletier de Saint-Fargeau in Annales historiques de la Révolution française, 2002, n°2, pp. 77–104
- Stephens, Henry Moore, The Principle Speeches of the Statesmen and Orators of the French Revolution 1789–1795, Oxford, Clarendon Press, 1892
- Luc-Normand Tellier, Face aux Colbert : les Le Tellier, Vauban, Turgot ... et l'avènement du libéralisme, Presses de l'Université du Québec, 1987, 816 pages. (Etexte)
- About David's painting:
  - Baticle, Jeannine, La seconde mort de Lepeletier de Saint-Fargeau. Recherches sur le sort du tableau de David in Bulletin de la Société Française d'Histoire de l'Art, 1988, Paris, 1989, pp. 131–145
  - Simon, Robert, David's Martyr-Portrait of Le Peletier de Saint-Fargeau and the conundrums of Revolutionary Representation in Art History, vol.14, n°4, December 1991, pp. 459–487
  - Vanden Berghe Marc & Plesca, Ioana, Lepelletier de Saint-Fargeau sur son lit de mort par Jacques-Louis David : saint Sébastien révolutionnaire, miroir multiréférencé de Rome, Brussels, 2005 – online on www.art-chitecture.net/publications.php
