= Chant du départ =

French revolutionary war song

Le chant du départ
English: 'The Song of Departure'
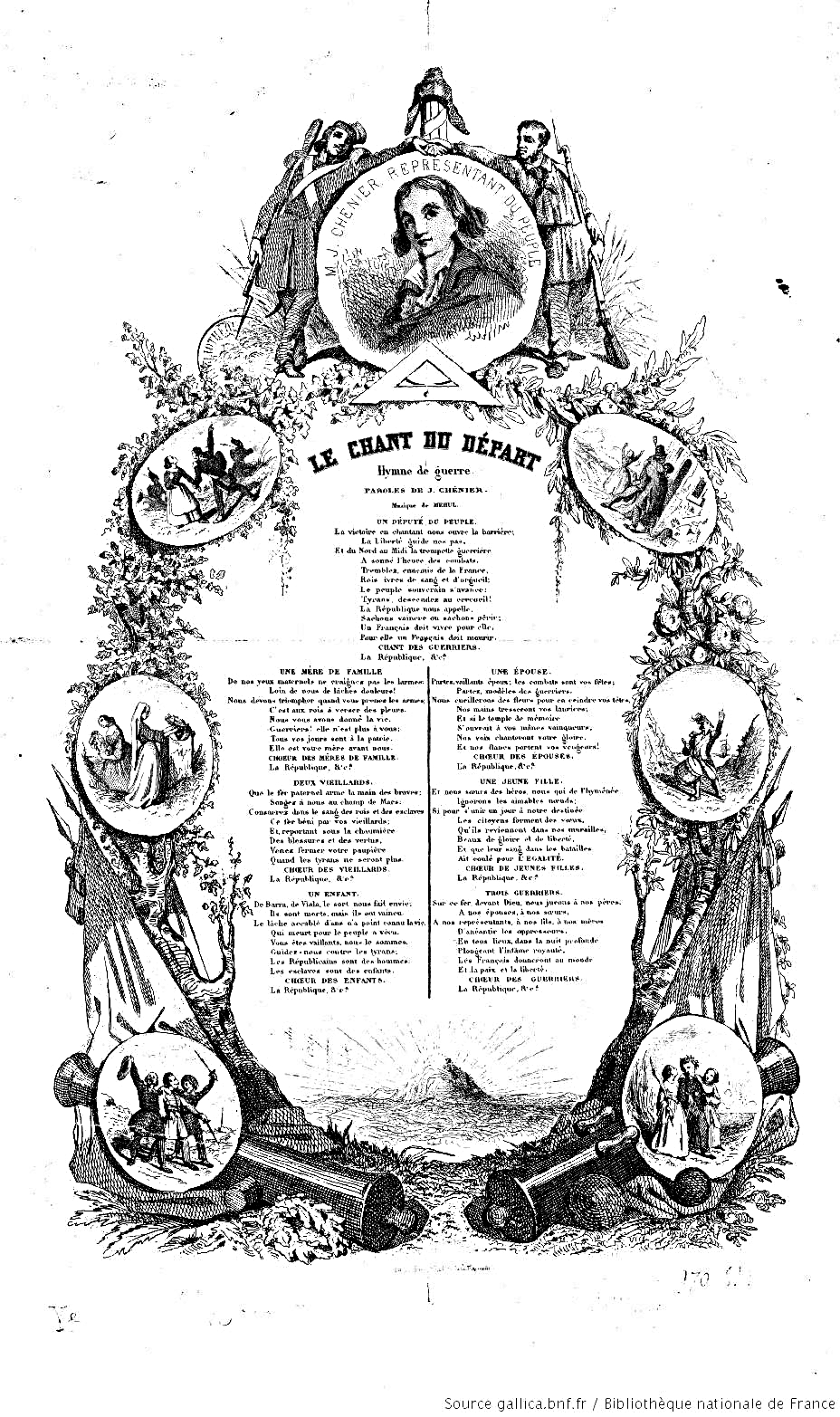
- National anthem of the First French Empire Personal anthem of the President of France Regional anthem of French Guiana
- Lyrics: Marie-Joseph Chénier, 1799
- Music: Étienne Méhul
- Adopted: 1804 (as national anthem); 1974 (as presidential anthem)
- Relinquished: 1815 (as national anthem)

Le Chant du Départ, anthem of the First French Empire (1931 recording)

"Le Chant du départ" (French: [lə ʃɑ̃ dy de.paʁ]; lit. 'The Song of Departure') is a French revolutionary war song, composed by Étienne Méhul and written by Marie-Joseph Chénier in 1794. It was the official anthem of the French Empire, and it is currently the unofficial regional anthem of French Guiana and the official presidential anthem of France.

The song was nicknamed "the brother of the Marseillaise" by French Republican soldiers.

The song was first performed on 14 July 1794. 18,000 copies of the music sheets were immediately printed and distributed to the army. Its original title was "Anthem to Liberty"; it was changed to its present title by Robespierre.

The song is a musical tableau: each of the seven stanzas is sung by a different character or group of characters:

- The first stanza is the discourse of a deputy cheering his soldiers and encouraging them for the fight for the Republic.
- The second stanza is the song of a mother offering the life of her son to the fatherland.
- The fourth stanza is sung by children exalting Joseph Agricol Viala and Joseph Bara, children aged 15 and 13, respectively, who had died for Revolutionary France. According to legend, Bara was surrounded by royalist Vendeans, when he was ordered to shout "Long live Louis XVII"; he shouted "Long live the Republic" instead and was executed on the spot. Viala was killed by a bullet as he was trying to sabotage an enemy bridge. His last words were "I die, but I die for the Republic."

The song is still in the repertoire of the French Army. It was sung during World War I. Valéry Giscard d'Estaing used it as his campaign song for the presidential election of 1974; as a president, he often had it played by troops along with the "Marseillaise".

== Lyrics ==
French original	English translation
I. (Un député du Peuple); La victoire en chantant Nous ouvre la barrière; La Liberté guide nos pas. Et du Nord au Midi; La trompette guerrière A sonné l'heure des combats. Tremblez ennemis de la France, Rois ivres de sang et d'orgueil; Le Peuple souverain s'avance: Tyrans descendez au cercueil ! Refrain (Chant des guerriers): La République nous appelle Sachons vaincre ou sachons périr 𝄆 Un Français doit vivre pour elle Pour elle un Français doit mourir. 𝄇	I. (A deputy of the People); Victory is singing Opening the gates for us; Liberty guideth our steps. And from North to South; The war trumpet Signaleth the hour of the fight. Tremble ye enemies of France, Kings drunk on blood and pride; The sovereign People cometh forth: Tyrants, down into thy graves ! Chorus (Song of the Warriors): The Republic is calling us Let us prevail or let us perish 𝄆 A Frenchman must live for her For her a Frenchman must die. 𝄇
II. (Une mère de famille); De nos yeux maternels ne craignez pas les larmes: Loin de nous de lâches douleurs ! Nous devons triompher quand vous prenez les armes: C'est aux rois à verser des pleurs. Nous vous avons donné la vie, Guerriers, elle n'est plus à vous; Tous vos jours sont à la patrie: Elle est votre mère avant nous. Refrain	II. (A mother of a family); Fear not that our motherly eyes should weep From us begone, cowardly grief! We must triumph when ye bear arms 'Tis the kings who must weep We gave ye life Warriors, 'tis no longer yours All your days belong to the Motherland 'Tis your mother above us all. Chorus
III. (Deux vieillards); Que le fer paternel arme la main des braves; Songez à nous au champ de Mars; Consacrez dans le sang des rois et des esclaves Le fer béni par vos vieillards; Et, rapportant sous la chaumière Des blessures et des vertus, Venez fermer notre paupière Quand les tyrans ne seront plus. Refrain	III. (Two old men); May the fatherly iron arm, the hand of the braves; Think of us on the Field of Mars; Bless with the blood of the kings and of the slaves The arms blessed by your elders; And bringing back home Wounds and virtues, Come and close our eyelids When tyrants are no more. Chorus
IV. (Un enfant); De Barra, de Viala le sort nous fait envie; Ils sont morts, mais ils ont vaincu. Le lâche accablé d'ans n'a point connu la vie: Qui meurt pour le peuple a vécu. Vous êtes vaillants, nous le sommes: Guidez-nous contre les tyrans; Les républicains sont des hommes, Les esclaves sont des enfants. Refrain	IV. (A child); The fates of Barra and Viala fill us with envy; They perished, yet they have prevailed. The coward plagued with years never experienced life: He who dieth for the People hath lived. Ye are brave, we are too: Guide us against the tyrants; The Republicans are men, The slaves are children. Chorus
V. (Une épouse); Partez, vaillants époux; les combats sont vos fêtes; Partez, modèles des guerriers; Nous cueillerons des fleurs pour en ceindre vos têtes: Nos mains tresserons vos lauriers. Et, si le temple de mémoire S'ouvrait à vos mânes vainqueurs, Nos voix chanterons votre gloire, Nos flancs porteront vos vengeurs. Refrain	V. (A wife); Leave, valiant husbands; Battles are your feasts; Leave, models of warriors; We shall pick flowers to crown your heads: Our hands shall braid laurels. And if the temple of memory Should open for your victorious manes, Our voices shall sing your glory, Our wombs shall bear your avengers. Chorus
VI. (Une jeune fille); Et nous, sœurs des héros, nous qui de l'hyménée Ignorons les aimables nœuds; Si, pour s'unir un jour à notre destinée, Les citoyens forment des vœux, Qu'ils reviennent dans nos murailles Beaux de gloire et de liberté, Et que leur sang, dans les batailles, Ait coulé pour l'égalité. Refrain	VI. (A young girl); And we, sisters of heroes, we who of Hymenaios; Ignore the loveable knots; If, to unite one day with our destiny, The citizens make wishes, May they come back into our walls Embellished with glory and liberty, And may their blood, in battles, Have flowed for equality. Chorus
VII. (Trois guerriers); Sur le fer devant Dieu, nous jurons à nos pères, À nos épouses, à nos sœurs, À nos représentants, à nos fils, à nos mères, D'anéantir les oppresseurs: En tous lieux, dans la nuit profonde, Plongeant l'infâme royauté, Les Français donneront au monde Et la paix et la liberté. Refrain	VII. (Three warriors); On the iron, before God, we swear to our fathers, To our wives, to our sisters, To our representatives, to our sons, to our mothers, To annihilate oppressors: Everywhere, into the deep night, By sinking the infamous royalty, The French shall give to the world Both peace and liberty. Chorus
