= Agricol Moureau =

Figure in the French Revolution

Agricol Moureau (born 1766, Avignon - died 1842, Aix-en-Provence) was a figure in the French Revolution.

Defrocked as a priest, he became a Jacobin and edited the Courrier d'Avignon. He set up the département of Vaucluse, acted as the French Directory's administrator of Vaucluse, became a member of the Council of Five Hundred and finally was made a commissioner of the Directory to Paris. He was also public prosecutor of Avignon

He was nicknamed "the Sans-culotte of Le Midi".

== See also ==
- France in the long nineteenth century
