= Pierre-Michel Alix =

French engraver

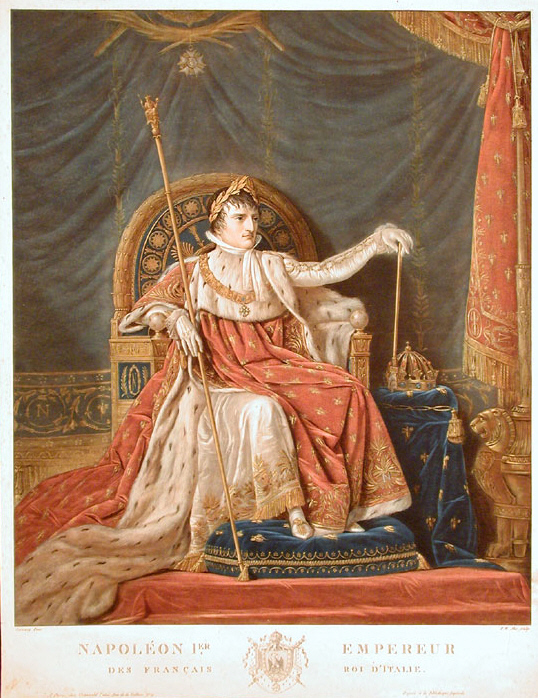
Napoleon I, Emperor of the French, King of Italy – engraving by Pierre-Michel Alix after Jean-François Garneray (c. 1805).

Pierre-Michel Alix (1762 – 27 December 1817) was a French engraver. He studied under Jacques-Philippe Le Bas and was best known for his portraits of notable figures during the French Revolution and First French Empire. Many of his works are now held in the Louvre's Cabinet des estampes and in France's Bibliothèque nationale.

== Life ==
Alix was born and died in Paris. One of the specialists of his era in colour printing, he produced many illustrations of Parisian life and fashion of his own time along with many caricatures. He produced prints of Voltaire, Helvétius, Buffon et Jean-Jacques Rousseau (1791).

He also produced images of figures from the French Revolution. For example, in 1789, he produced 18 prints of members of the National Constituent Assembly, notably Mirabeau, the Abbé Grégoire, Charles and Alexandre de Lameth and Antoine Barnave, published by Levacher de Charnois. He also produced printed portraits of Jean-Paul Marat, Pierre Louis Manuel, Marie Joseph Chalier, general Custine, general Dumouriez Antoine Lavoisier and Charlotte Corday. However, he was best known for his portraits of the child heroes Joseph Bara and Joseph Agricol Viala, whose distribution was largely funded and organised by the revolutionary propaganda machine.

Under the French Directory and French Consulate, Alix turned especially towards historic subjects and subjects inspired by classical antiquity. He also produced prints of Benjamin Franklin (1795), general Hoche, general Augereau (1797), general Bonaparte at the head of the armée d'Italie (1798), general Kléber at the head of the armée de Sambre-et-Meuse (1798), general Berthier at the pont de Lodi on 10 May 1796, general Bernadotte, Antoine-François Fourcroy (1802), Napoleon as First Consul (1803) and a group portrait of the three consuls (Bonaparte, Cambacérès and Lebrun).

In 1815, on the Second Restoration, he produced a print of Louis XVIII after a painting by Pasquier and a The King's return on 8 July 1815 after Martinet.
