= Marie-Joseph Chénier =

French poet, dramatist and politician (1764–1811)

Marie-Joseph Blaise de Chénier
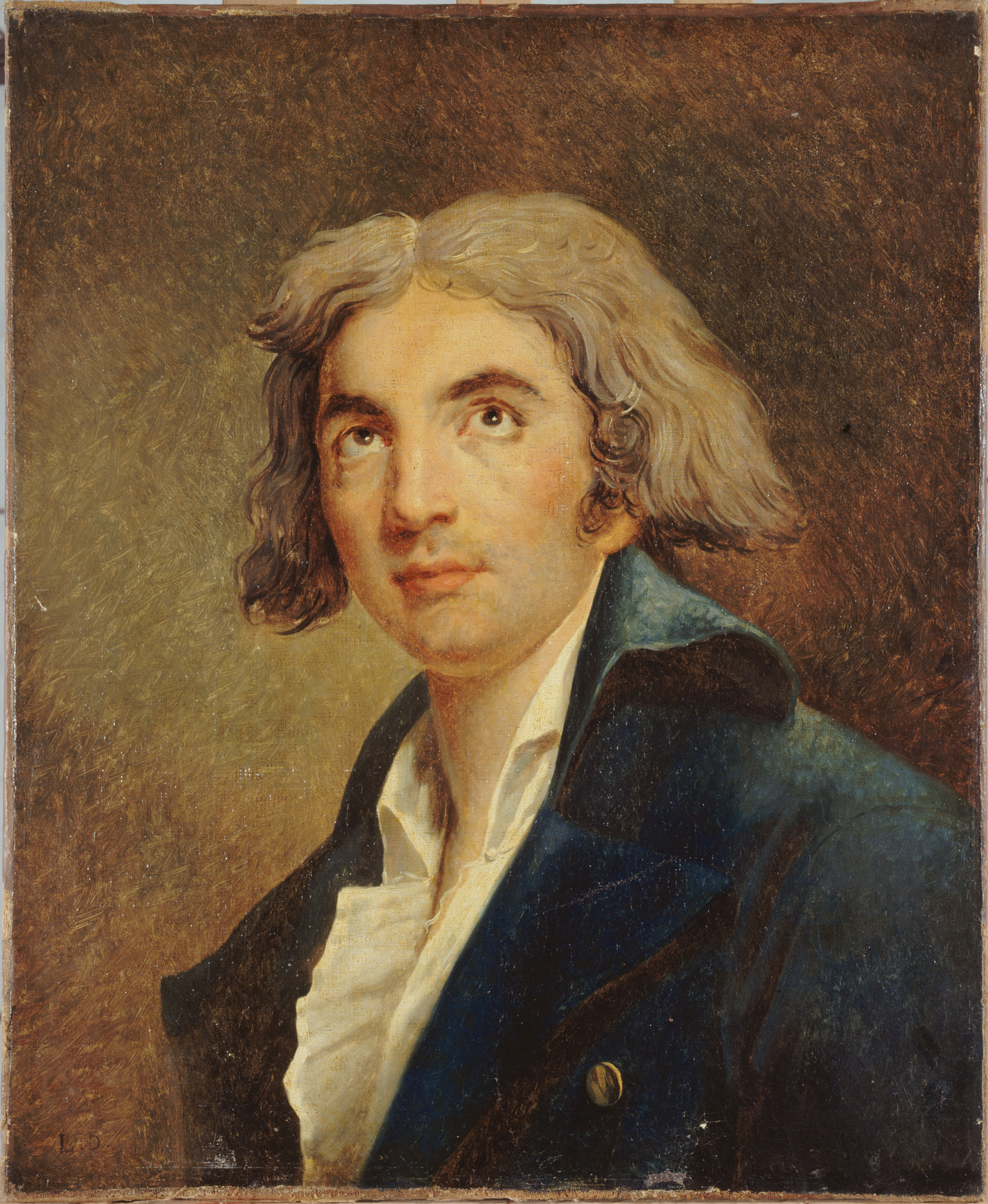
- Born: 11 February 1764; Constantinople, Ottoman Empire
- Died: 10 January 1811 (aged 46); Paris, France
- Resting place: Père Lachaise Cemetery
- Known for: Chant du départ

Marie-Joseph Blaise de Chénier (French pronunciation: [maʁi ʒozɛf blɛz də ʃenje]; 11 February 1764 – 10 January 1811) was a French poet, dramatist and politician of French and Greek origin. Active in the years leading up to and during the French Revolution, he was a fierce critic of the French monarchy and his plays were widely performed during the First Republic era.

== Biography ==
The younger brother of André Chénier, Joseph Chénier was born in Constantinople, but brought up at Carcassonne. He was educated in Paris at the Collège de Navarre. He entered the army at seventeen but left it two years later. At nineteen, he produced Azémire, a two-act drama (acted in 1786), and Edgar, ou le page supposé, a comedy (acted in 1785), which both failed. His Charles IX was kept back for nearly two years by the censor. Chénier attacked the censorship in three pamphlets, and the controversy generated keen public interest in the piece. When it was at last produced on 4 November 1789, it was an immense success, and largely ended the monarchy's censorship power.

Camille Desmoulins said that the piece had done more for the Revolution than the days of October, and a contemporary memoir-writer, the marquis de Ferrire, says that the audience came away "ivre de vengeance et du tourment d'un soir de sang ("drunk with the vengeance and torment of an evening of blood)". The performance was the occasion of a split among the actors of the Comédie-Française, and the new theatre in the Palais Royal, established by the dissidents, was inaugurated with Henri VIII (1791), generally recognised as Chénier's masterpiece; Jean Calas, ou l'école des juges ("Jean Calas, or the judges' school") followed in the same year.

In 1792, he produced his Caïus Gracchus, which was even more revolutionary in tone than its predecessors. Nevertheless, it was banned the following year at the request of Montagnard deputy Albitte, due to the anti-anarchical hemistich Des lois et non du sang ("Laws, and not blood"); Fénelon (1793) was suspended after a few representations; and in 1794 Timoléon, set to Etienne Méhul's music, was also proscribed. This piece was played after the Reign of Terror, but the play's use of fratricide was used as the basis of rumors that Chenier had arranged for the execution of André.

Joseph Chénier had been a member of the National Convention and had voted for the death of Louis XVI; he belonged to the committees of general security, and of public safety. He was, nevertheless, suspected of moderate sentiments, and before the end of the Terror had become widely distrusted by the ruling Jacobins. On 7 March 1794 André was arrested by the Committee for Public Safety. Chénier's attempts to release his older brother were unsuccessful; André was ultimately executed on 25 July, just three days before Maximilien Robespierre's overthrow ended the Terror.

=== Post-Revolution ===
After the Coup of 18 Brumaire effectively ended the French Revolution, Chénier continued his political career. He held a seat in the Council of Five Hundred and the tribunat. In 1801 he was one of the educational jury for the Seine département. His political career ended in 1802, when he was eliminated with others from the tribunate for his opposition to Napoleon Bonaparte. From 1803 to 1806 he was inspector-general of public instruction. He later reconciled with Napoleon's government and was commissioned to write Cyrus to be performed after Napoleon's coronation as First Consul. He was later temporarily disgraced in 1806 for his Épître à Voltaire. In 1806 and 1807 he delivered a course of lectures at the Atheneum on the language and literature of France from the earliest years; and in 1808 at the emperor's request, he prepared a book of literary criticism, Tableau historique de l'état et du progrés de la littérature française depuis 1789 jusqu'à 1808 ("Historical view of the state and progress of French literature from 1789 to 1808").

The list of his works includes hymns and national songs among others, the famous Chant du départ; odes, Sur la mort de Mirabeau, Sur l'oligarchie de Robespierre, etc.; tragedies which never reached the stage, Brutus et Cassius, Philippe deux, Tibère; translations from Sophocles and Lessing, from Thomas Gray and Horace, from Tacitus and Aristotle; with elegies, dithyrambics and Ossianic rhapsodies.
