= Messidor =

10th month in the French Republican calendar

Messidor (French pronunciation: [mesidɔʁ]) was the tenth month in the French Republican Calendar. The month was named after the Latin word messis 'harvest'.

Messidor was the first month of the summer quarter (mois d'été). It started on 19 or 20 June. It ended on 18 or 19 July. It follows Prairial and precedes Thermidor.

Year: 3
Month: Messidor
Year: III

Day of the 10-day
week (décade)
Primidi
Duodi
Tridi
Quartidi
Quintidi
Sextidi
Septidi
Octidi
Nonidi
Décadi

décade 28
1	Friday; 19 June 1795
2	Saturday; 20 June 1795
3	Sunday; 21 June 1795
4	Monday; 22 June 1795
5	Tuesday; 23 June 1795
6	Wednesday; 24 June 1795
7	Thursday; 25 June 1795
8	Friday; 26 June 1795
9	Saturday; 27 June 1795
10	Sunday; 28 June 1795

décade 29
11	Monday; 29 June 1795
12	Tuesday; 30 June 1795
13	Wednesday; 1 July 1795
14	Thursday; 2 July 1795
15	Friday; 3 July 1795
16	Saturday; 4 July 1795
17	Sunday; 5 July 1795
18	Monday; 6 July 1795
19	Tuesday; 7 July 1795
20	Wednesday; 8 July 1795

décade 30
21	Thursday; 9 July 1795
22	Friday; 10 July 1795
23	Saturday; 11 July 1795
24	Sunday; 12 July 1795
25	Monday; 13 July 1795
26	Tuesday; 14 July 1795
27	Wednesday; 15 July 1795
28	Thursday; 16 July 1795
29	Friday; 17 July 1795
30	Saturday; 18 July 1795

Decimal time – 10 h/day
Paris
0h59m05s

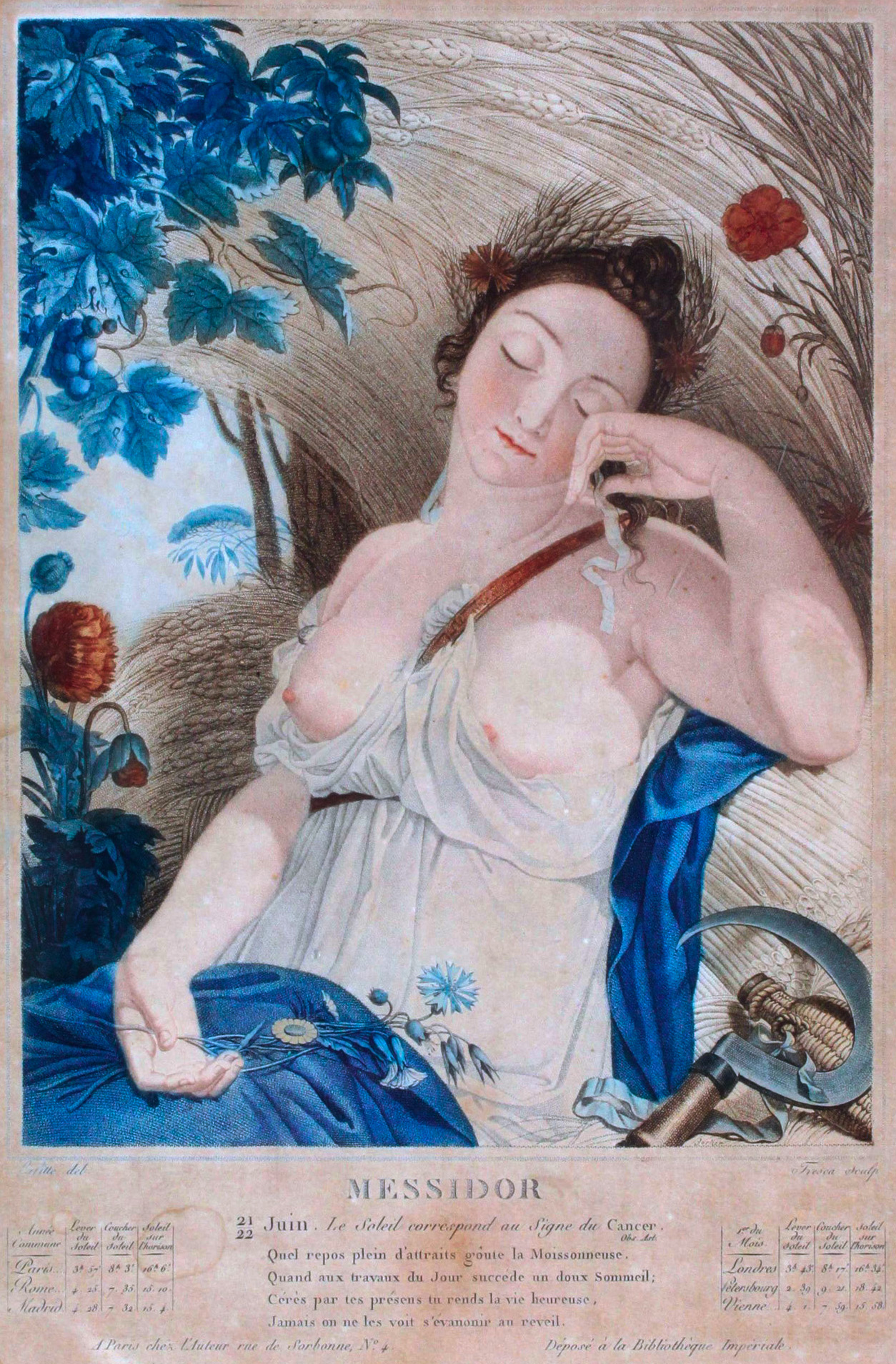
Messidor

01:15:41
Time of day - 24 h/day
Greenwich

Conversion between Republican and Gregorian calendar for the years I - XIV

Year: 1
Month: Messidor
Year: I

Day of the 10-day
week (décade)
Primidi
Duodi
Tridi
Quartidi
Quintidi
Sextidi
Septidi
Octidi
Nonidi
Décadi

décade 28
1	Wednesday; 19 June 1793
2	Thursday; 20 June 1793
3	Friday; 21 June 1793
4	Saturday; 22 June 1793
5	Sunday; 23 June 1793
6	Monday; 24 June 1793
7	Tuesday; 25 June 1793
8	Wednesday; 26 June 1793
9	Thursday; 27 June 1793
10	Friday; 28 June 1793

décade 29
11	Saturday; 29 June 1793
12	Sunday; 30 June 1793
13	Monday; 1 July 1793
14	Tuesday; 2 July 1793
15	Wednesday; 3 July 1793
16	Thursday; 4 July 1793
17	Friday; 5 July 1793
18	Saturday; 6 July 1793
19	Sunday; 7 July 1793
20	Monday; 8 July 1793

décade 30
21	Tuesday; 9 July 1793
22	Wednesday; 10 July 1793
23	Thursday; 11 July 1793
24	Friday; 12 July 1793
25	Saturday; 13 July 1793
26	Sunday; 14 July 1793
27	Monday; 15 July 1793
28	Tuesday; 16 July 1793
29	Wednesday; 17 July 1793
30	Thursday; 18 July 1793

Decimal time – 10 h/day
Paris
0:52:55

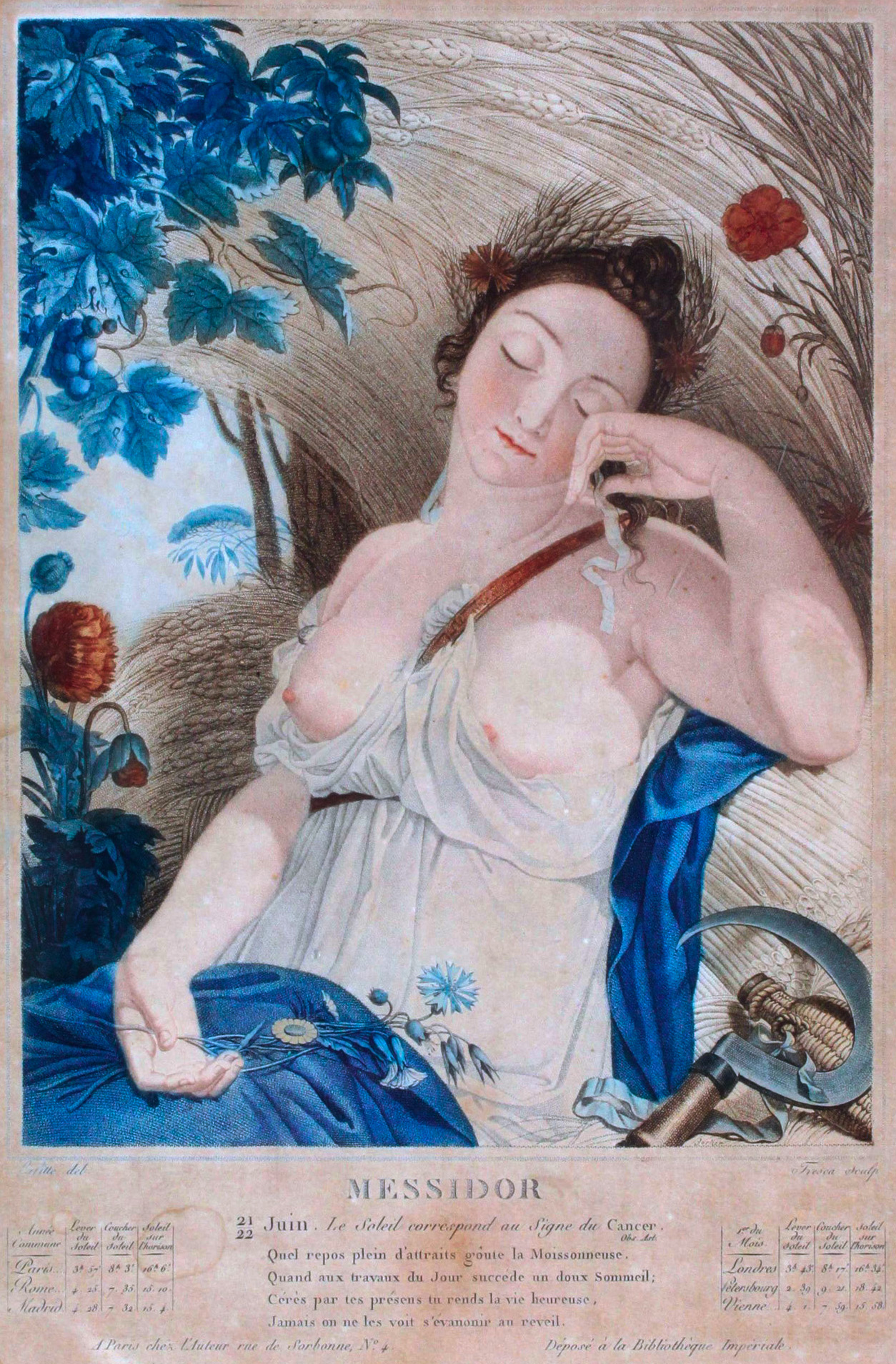
Messidor

01:15:41
Time of day - 24 h/day
Greenwich

Year: 2
Month: Messidor
Year: II

Day of the 10-day
week (décade)
Primidi
Duodi
Tridi
Quartidi
Quintidi
Sextidi
Septidi
Octidi
Nonidi
Décadi

décade 28
1	Thursday; 19 June 1794
2	Friday; 20 June 1794
3	Saturday; 21 June 1794
4	Sunday; 22 June 1794
5	Monday; 23 June 1794
6	Tuesday; 24 June 1794
7	Wednesday; 25 June 1794
8	Thursday; 26 June 1794
9	Friday; 27 June 1794
10	Saturday; 28 June 1794

décade 29
11	Sunday; 29 June 1794
12	Monday; 30 June 1794
13	Tuesday; 1 July 1794
14	Wednesday; 2 July 1794
15	Thursday; 3 July 1794
16	Friday; 4 July 1794
17	Saturday; 5 July 1794
18	Sunday; 6 July 1794
19	Monday; 7 July 1794
20	Tuesday; 8 July 1794

décade 30
21	Wednesday; 9 July 1794
22	Thursday; 10 July 1794
23	Friday; 11 July 1794
24	Saturday; 12 July 1794
25	Sunday; 13 July 1794
26	Monday; 14 July 1794
27	Tuesday; 15 July 1794
28	Wednesday; 16 July 1794
29	Thursday; 17 July 1794
30	Friday; 18 July 1794

Decimal time – 10 h/day
Paris
0:52:55

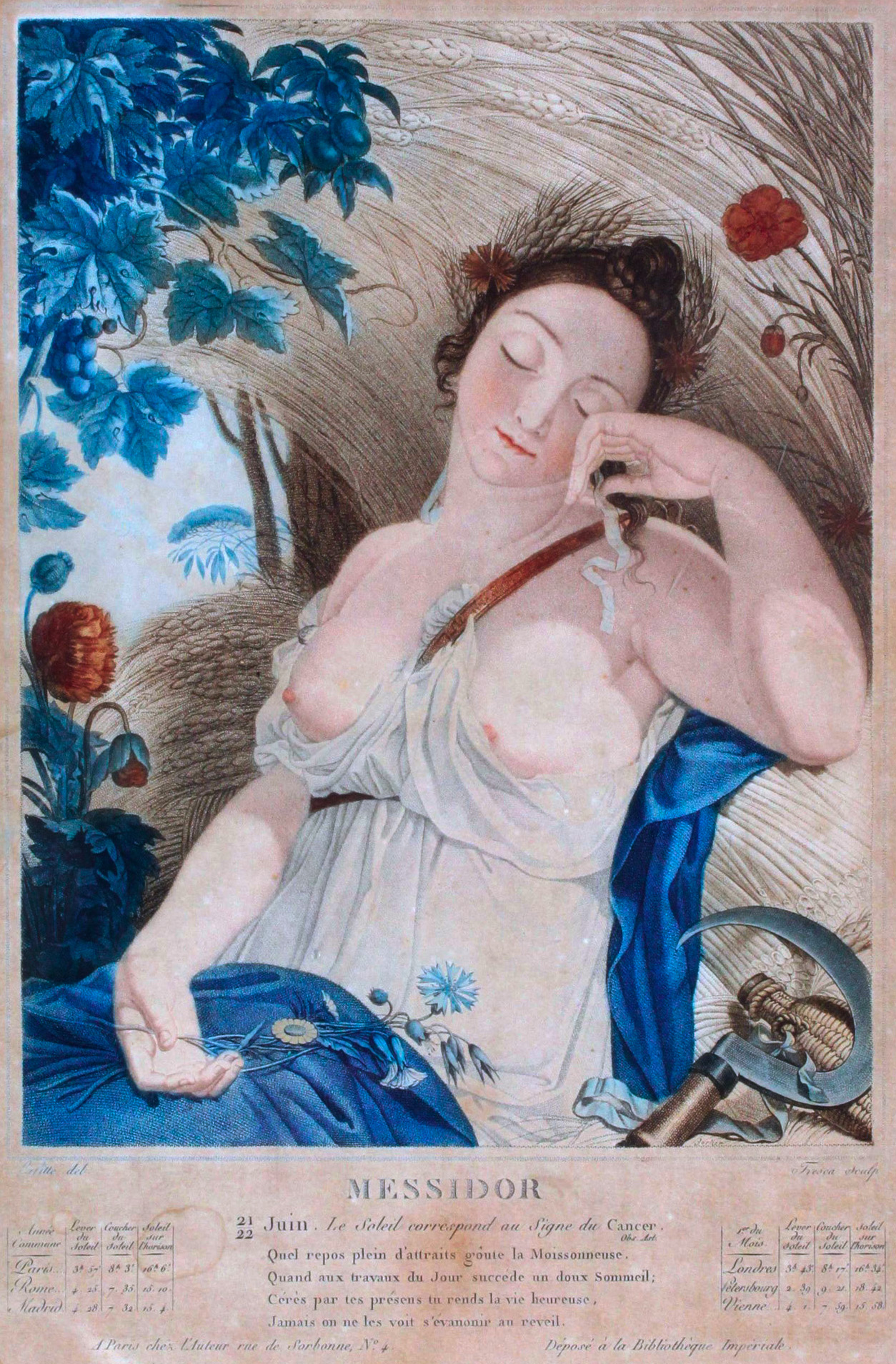
Messidor

01:15:41
Time of day - 24 h/day
Greenwich

Year: 3
Month: Messidor
Year: III

Day of the 10-day
week (décade)
Primidi
Duodi
Tridi
Quartidi
Quintidi
Sextidi
Septidi
Octidi
Nonidi
Décadi

décade 28
1	Friday; 19 June 1795
2	Saturday; 20 June 1795
3	Sunday; 21 June 1795
4	Monday; 22 June 1795
5	Tuesday; 23 June 1795
6	Wednesday; 24 June 1795
7	Thursday; 25 June 1795
8	Friday; 26 June 1795
9	Saturday; 27 June 1795
10	Sunday; 28 June 1795

décade 29
11	Monday; 29 June 1795
12	Tuesday; 30 June 1795
13	Wednesday; 1 July 1795
14	Thursday; 2 July 1795
15	Friday; 3 July 1795
16	Saturday; 4 July 1795
17	Sunday; 5 July 1795
18	Monday; 6 July 1795
19	Tuesday; 7 July 1795
20	Wednesday; 8 July 1795

décade 30
21	Thursday; 9 July 1795
22	Friday; 10 July 1795
23	Saturday; 11 July 1795
24	Sunday; 12 July 1795
25	Monday; 13 July 1795
26	Tuesday; 14 July 1795
27	Wednesday; 15 July 1795
28	Thursday; 16 July 1795
29	Friday; 17 July 1795
30	Saturday; 18 July 1795

Decimal time – 10 h/day
Paris
0:52:55

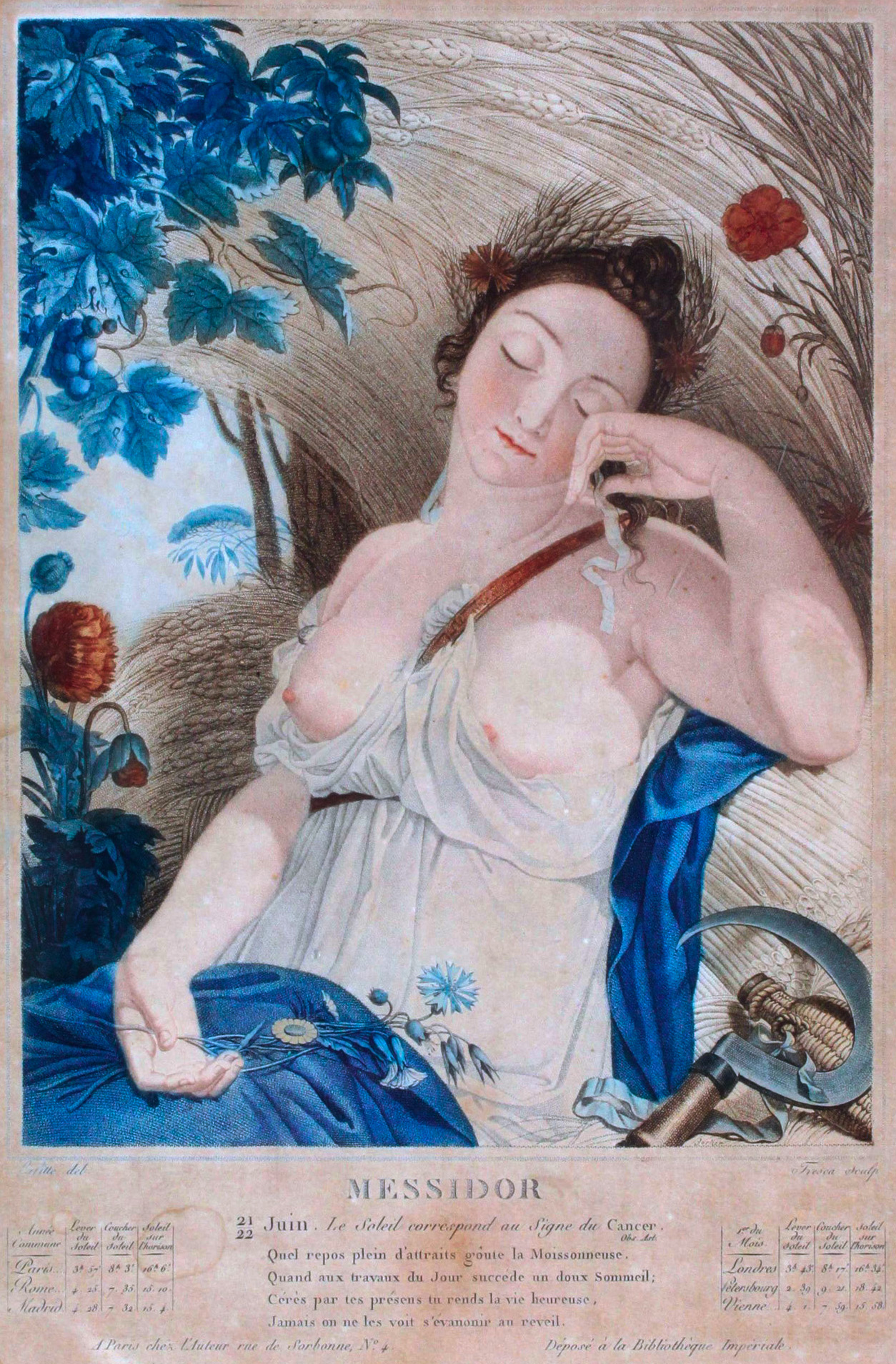
Messidor

01:15:41
Time of day - 24 h/day
Greenwich

Year: 4
Month: Messidor
Year: IV

Day of the 10-day
week (décade)
Primidi
Duodi
Tridi
Quartidi
Quintidi
Sextidi
Septidi
Octidi
Nonidi
Décadi

décade 28
1	Sunday; 19 June 1796
2	Monday; 20 June 1796
3	Tuesday; 21 June 1796
4	Wednesday; 22 June 1796
5	Thursday; 23 June 1796
6	Friday; 24 June 1796
7	Saturday; 25 June 1796
8	Sunday; 26 June 1796
9	Monday; 27 June 1796
10	Tuesday; 28 June 1796

décade 29
11	Wednesday; 29 June 1796
12	Thursday; 30 June 1796
13	Friday; 1 July 1796
14	Saturday; 2 July 1796
15	Sunday; 3 July 1796
16	Monday; 4 July 1796
17	Tuesday; 5 July 1796
18	Wednesday; 6 July 1796
19	Thursday; 7 July 1796
20	Friday; 8 July 1796

décade 30
21	Saturday; 9 July 1796
22	Sunday; 10 July 1796
23	Monday; 11 July 1796
24	Tuesday; 12 July 1796
25	Wednesday; 13 July 1796
26	Thursday; 14 July 1796
27	Friday; 15 July 1796
28	Saturday; 16 July 1796
29	Sunday; 17 July 1796
30	Monday; 18 July 1796

Decimal time – 10 h/day
Paris
0:52:55

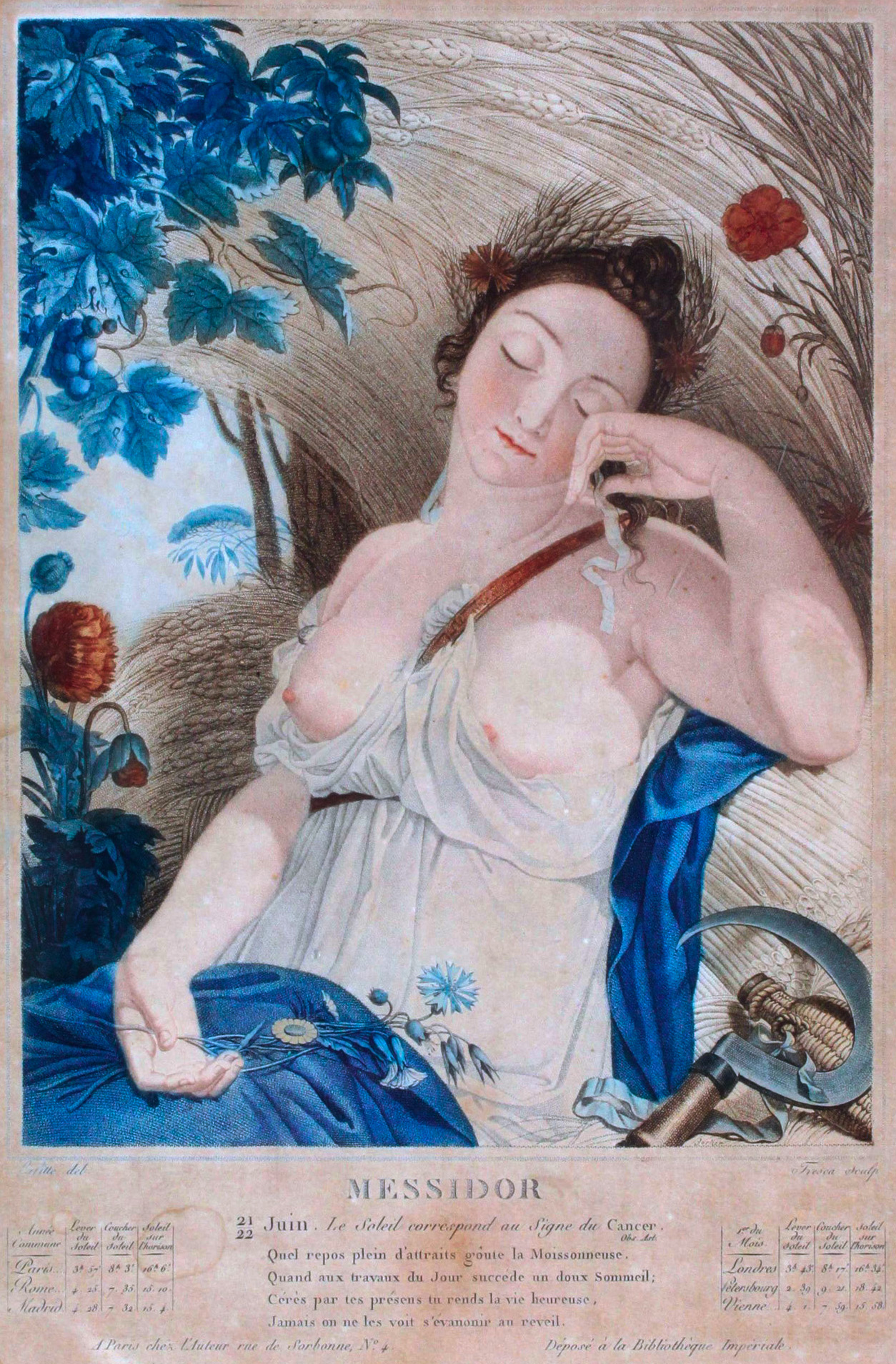
Messidor

01:15:41
Time of day - 24 h/day
Greenwich

Year: 5
Month: Messidor
Year: V

Day of the 10-day
week (décade)
Primidi
Duodi
Tridi
Quartidi
Quintidi
Sextidi
Septidi
Octidi
Nonidi
Décadi

décade 28
1	Monday; 19 June 1797
2	Tuesday; 20 June 1797
3	Wednesday; 21 June 1797
4	Thursday; 22 June 1797
5	Friday; 23 June 1797
6	Saturday; 24 June 1797
7	Sunday; 25 June 1797
8	Monday; 26 June 1797
9	Tuesday; 27 June 1797
10	Wednesday; 28 June 1797

décade 29
11	Thursday; 29 June 1797
12	Friday; 30 June 1797
13	Saturday; 1 July 1797
14	Sunday; 2 July 1797
15	Monday; 3 July 1797
16	Tuesday; 4 July 1797
17	Wednesday; 5 July 1797
18	Thursday; 6 July 1797
19	Friday; 7 July 1797
20	Saturday; 8 July 1797

décade 30
21	Sunday; 9 July 1797
22	Monday; 10 July 1797
23	Tuesday; 11 July 1797
24	Wednesday; 12 July 1797
25	Thursday; 13 July 1797
26	Friday; 14 July 1797
27	Saturday; 15 July 1797
28	Sunday; 16 July 1797
29	Monday; 17 July 1797
30	Tuesday; 18 July 1797

Decimal time – 10 h/day
Paris
0:52:55

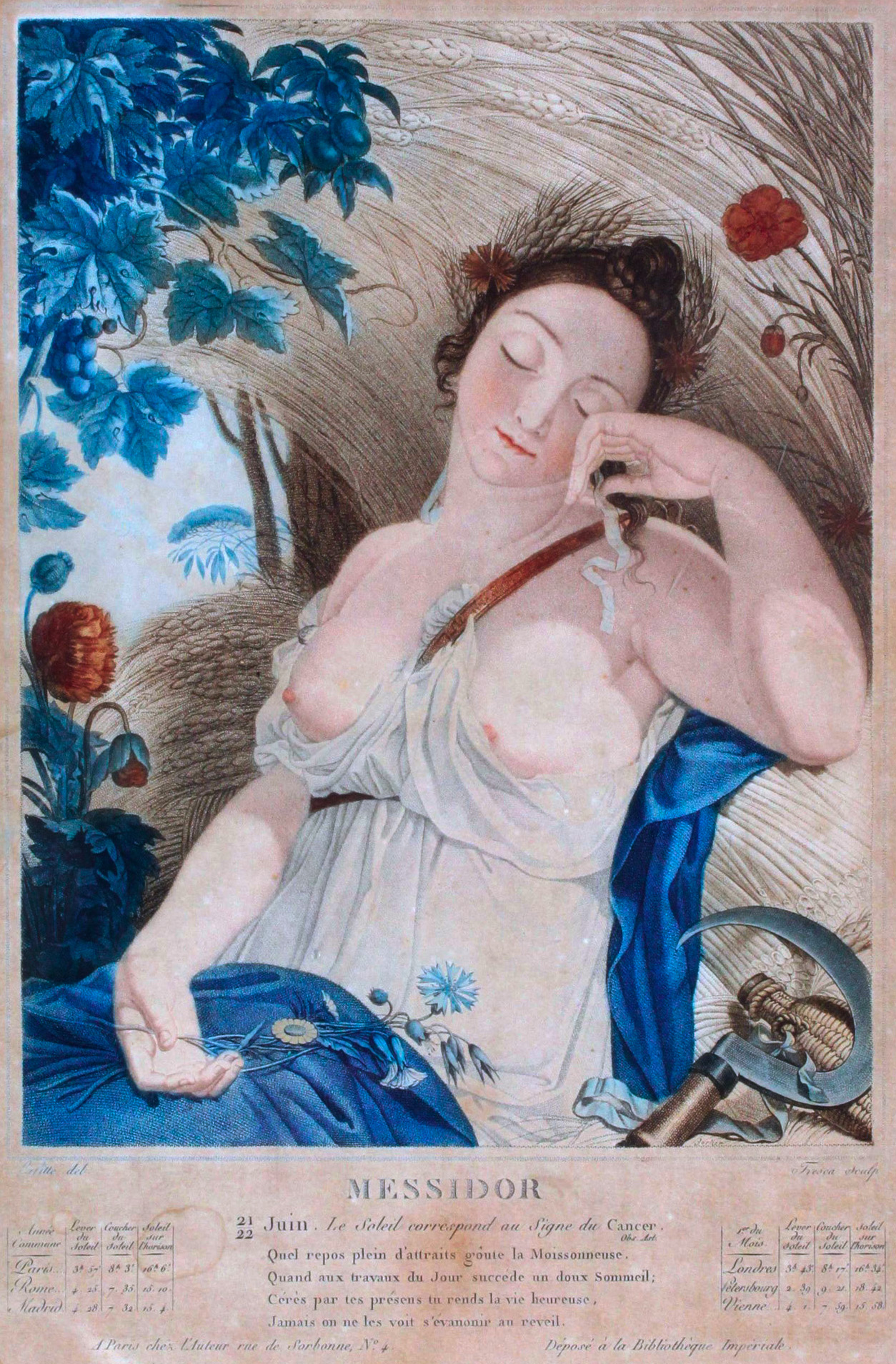
Messidor

01:15:41
Time of day - 24 h/day
Greenwich

Year: 6
Month: Messidor
Year: VI

Day of the 10-day
week (décade)
Primidi
Duodi
Tridi
Quartidi
Quintidi
Sextidi
Septidi
Octidi
Nonidi
Décadi

décade 28
1	Tuesday; 19 June 1798
2	Wednesday; 20 June 1798
3	Thursday; 21 June 1798
4	Friday; 22 June 1798
5	Saturday; 23 June 1798
6	Sunday; 24 June 1798
7	Monday; 25 June 1798
8	Tuesday; 26 June 1798
9	Wednesday; 27 June 1798
10	Thursday; 28 June 1798

décade 29
11	Friday; 29 June 1798
12	Saturday; 30 June 1798
13	Sunday; 1 July 1798
14	Monday; 2 July 1798
15	Tuesday; 3 July 1798
16	Wednesday; 4 July 1798
17	Thursday; 5 July 1798
18	Friday; 6 July 1798
19	Saturday; 7 July 1798
20	Sunday; 8 July 1798

décade 30
21	Monday; 9 July 1798
22	Tuesday; 10 July 1798
23	Wednesday; 11 July 1798
24	Thursday; 12 July 1798
25	Friday; 13 July 1798
26	Saturday; 14 July 1798
27	Sunday; 15 July 1798
28	Monday; 16 July 1798
29	Tuesday; 17 July 1798
30	Wednesday; 18 July 1798

Decimal time – 10 h/day
Paris
0:52:55

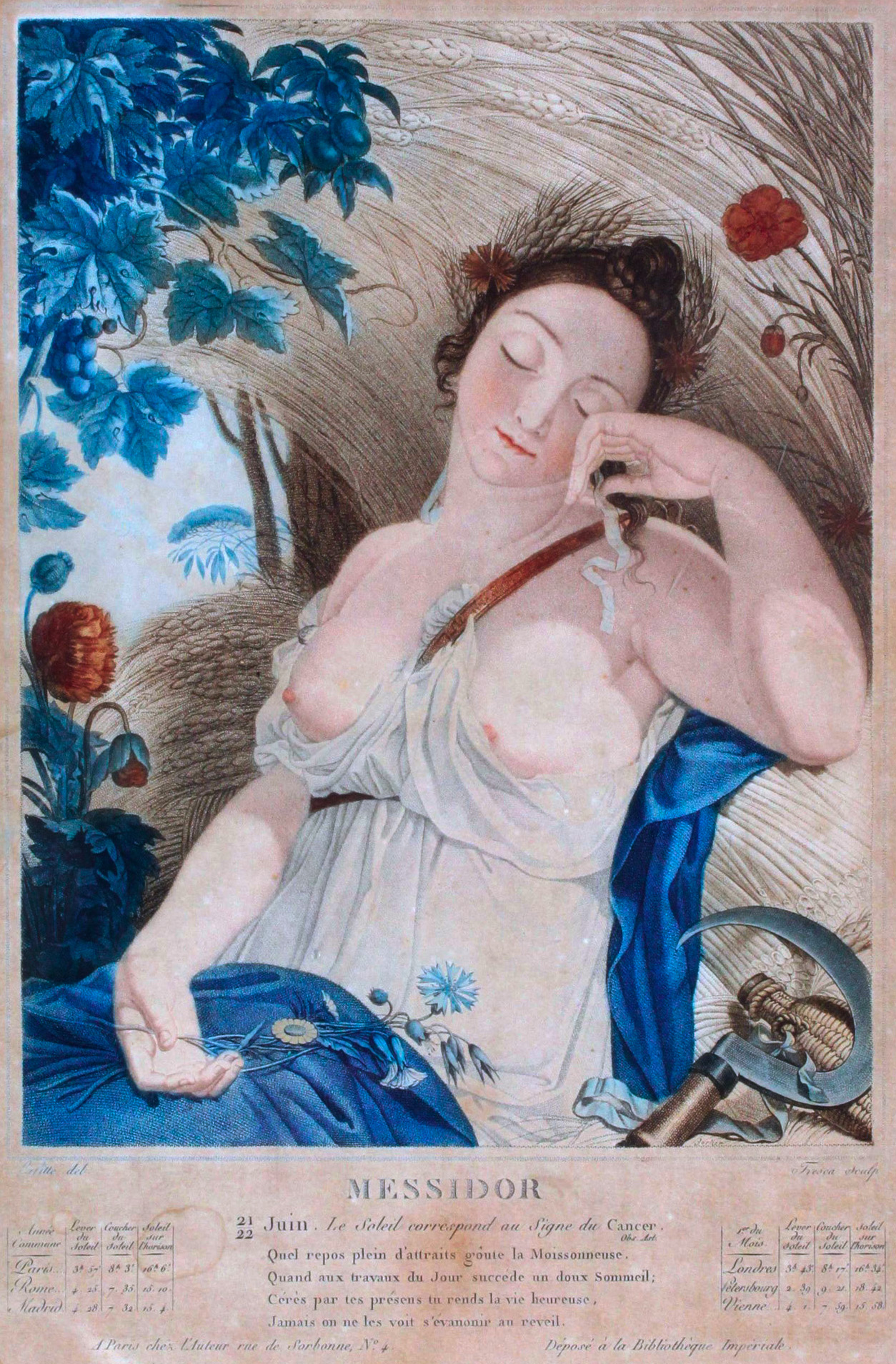
Messidor

01:15:41
Time of day - 24 h/day
Greenwich

Year: 7
Month: Messidor
Year: VII

Day of the 10-day
week (décade)
Primidi
Duodi
Tridi
Quartidi
Quintidi
Sextidi
Septidi
Octidi
Nonidi
Décadi

décade 28
1	Wednesday; 19 June 1799
2	Thursday; 20 June 1799
3	Friday; 21 June 1799
4	Saturday; 22 June 1799
5	Sunday; 23 June 1799
6	Monday; 24 June 1799
7	Tuesday; 25 June 1799
8	Wednesday; 26 June 1799
9	Thursday; 27 June 1799
10	Friday; 28 June 1799

décade 29
11	Saturday; 29 June 1799
12	Sunday; 30 June 1799
13	Monday; 1 July 1799
14	Tuesday; 2 July 1799
15	Wednesday; 3 July 1799
16	Thursday; 4 July 1799
17	Friday; 5 July 1799
18	Saturday; 6 July 1799
19	Sunday; 7 July 1799
20	Monday; 8 July 1799

décade 30
21	Tuesday; 9 July 1799
22	Wednesday; 10 July 1799
23	Thursday; 11 July 1799
24	Friday; 12 July 1799
25	Saturday; 13 July 1799
26	Sunday; 14 July 1799
27	Monday; 15 July 1799
28	Tuesday; 16 July 1799
29	Wednesday; 17 July 1799
30	Thursday; 18 July 1799

Decimal time – 10 h/day
Paris
0:52:55

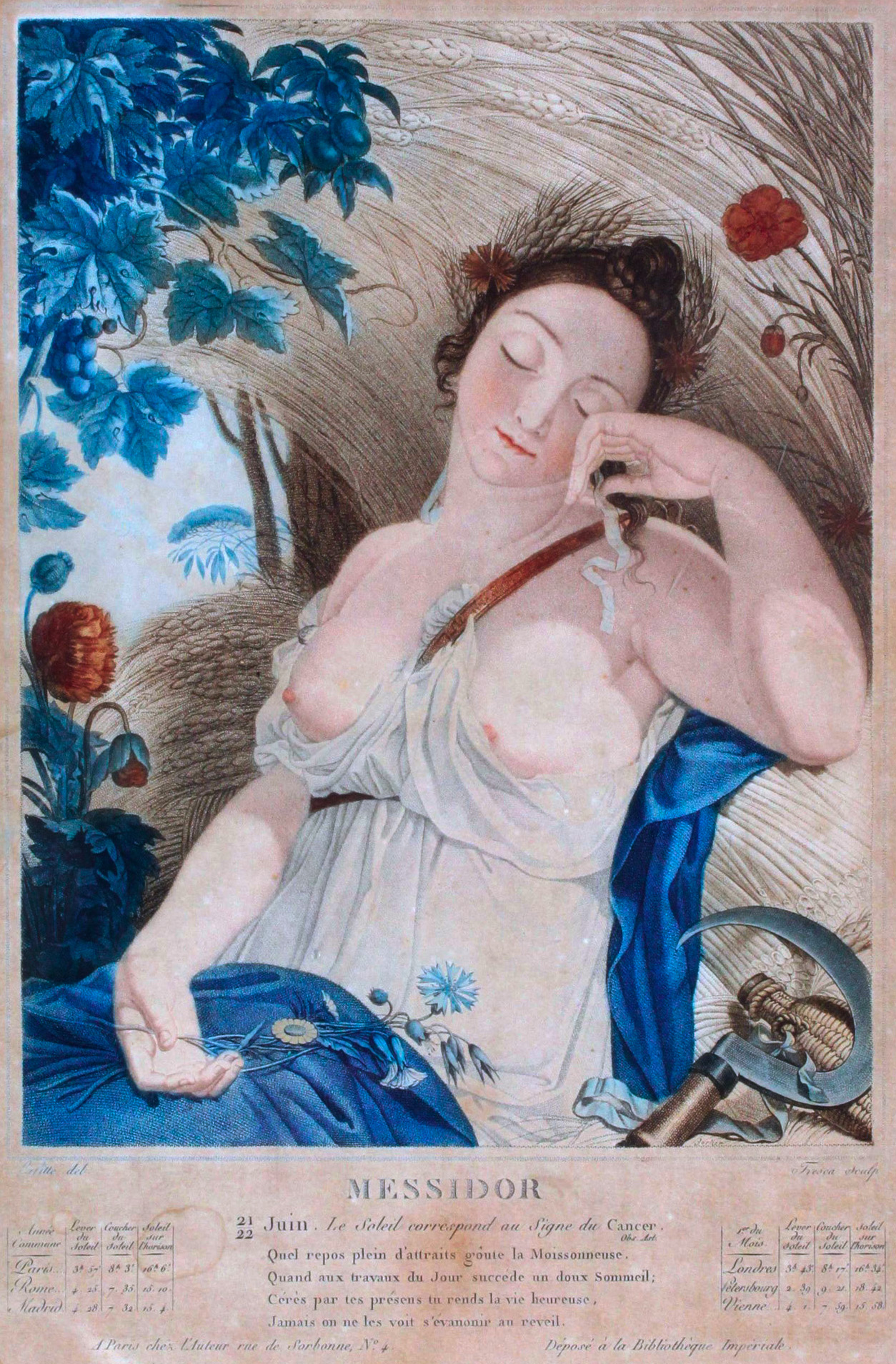
Messidor

01:15:41
Time of day - 24 h/day
Greenwich

Year: 8
Month: Messidor
Year: VIII

Day of the 10-day
week (décade)
Primidi
Duodi
Tridi
Quartidi
Quintidi
Sextidi
Septidi
Octidi
Nonidi
Décadi

décade 28
1	Friday; 20 June 1800
2	Saturday; 21 June 1800
3	Sunday; 22 June 1800
4	Monday; 23 June 1800
5	Tuesday; 24 June 1800
6	Wednesday; 25 June 1800
7	Thursday; 26 June 1800
8	Friday; 27 June 1800
9	Saturday; 28 June 1800
10	Sunday; 29 June 1800

décade 29
11	Monday; 30 June 1800
12	Tuesday; 1 July 1800
13	Wednesday; 2 July 1800
14	Thursday; 3 July 1800
15	Friday; 4 July 1800
16	Saturday; 5 July 1800
17	Sunday; 6 July 1800
18	Monday; 7 July 1800
19	Tuesday; 8 July 1800
20	Wednesday; 9 July 1800

décade 30
21	Thursday; 10 July 1800
22	Friday; 11 July 1800
23	Saturday; 12 July 1800
24	Sunday; 13 July 1800
25	Monday; 14 July 1800
26	Tuesday; 15 July 1800
27	Wednesday; 16 July 1800
28	Thursday; 17 July 1800
29	Friday; 18 July 1800
30	Saturday; 19 July 1800

Decimal time – 10 h/day
Paris
0:52:55

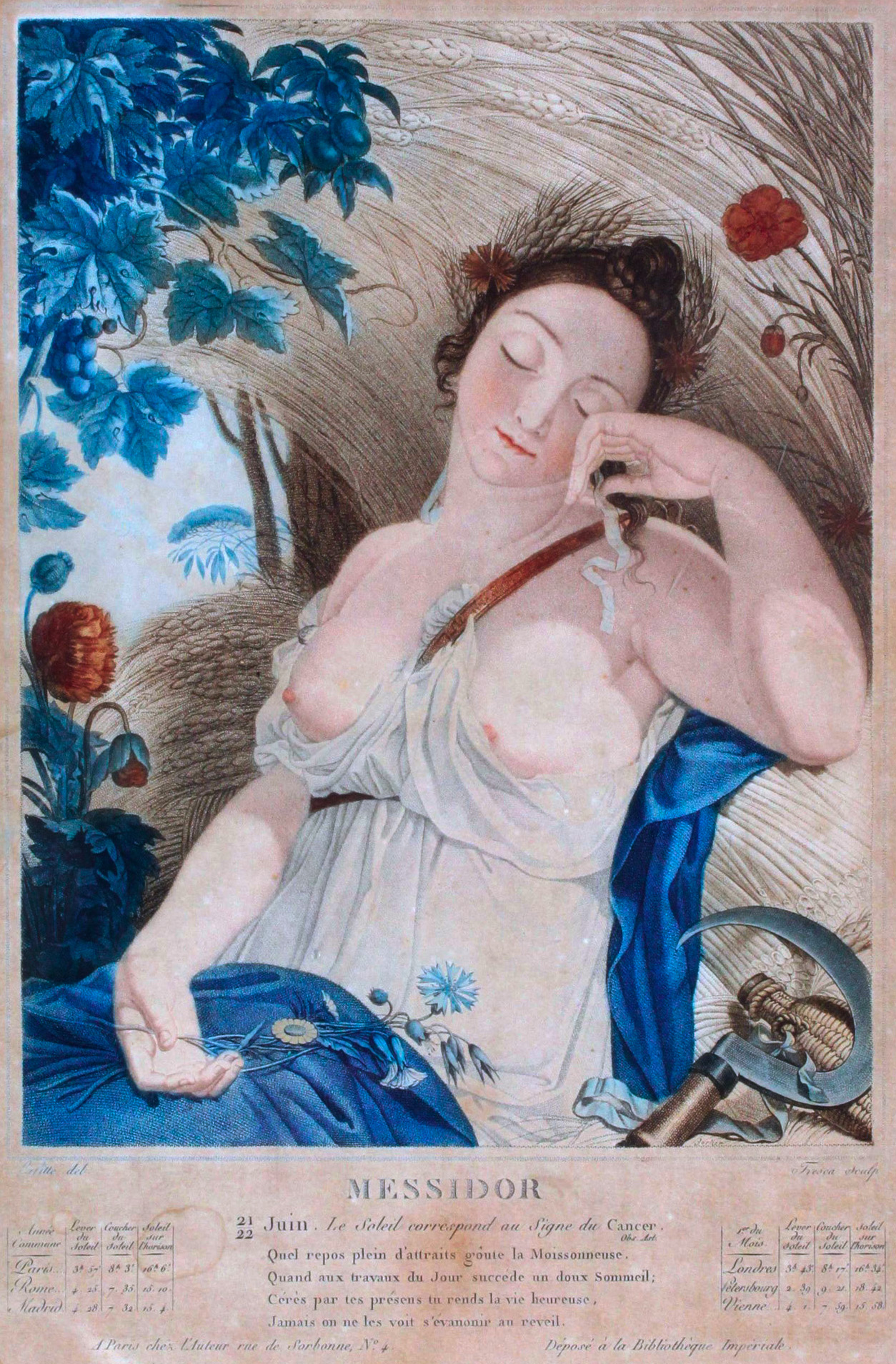
Messidor

01:15:41
Time of day - 24 h/day
Greenwich

Year: 9
Month: Messidor
Year: IX

Day of the 10-day
week (décade)
Primidi
Duodi
Tridi
Quartidi
Quintidi
Sextidi
Septidi
Octidi
Nonidi
Décadi

décade 28
1	Saturday; 20 June 1801
2	Sunday; 21 June 1801
3	Monday; 22 June 1801
4	Tuesday; 23 June 1801
5	Wednesday; 24 June 1801
6	Thursday; 25 June 1801
7	Friday; 26 June 1801
8	Saturday; 27 June 1801
9	Sunday; 28 June 1801
10	Monday; 29 June 1801

décade 29
11	Tuesday; 30 June 1801
12	Wednesday; 1 July 1801
13	Thursday; 2 July 1801
14	Friday; 3 July 1801
15	Saturday; 4 July 1801
16	Sunday; 5 July 1801
17	Monday; 6 July 1801
18	Tuesday; 7 July 1801
19	Wednesday; 8 July 1801
20	Thursday; 9 July 1801

décade 30
21	Friday; 10 July 1801
22	Saturday; 11 July 1801
23	Sunday; 12 July 1801
24	Monday; 13 July 1801
25	Tuesday; 14 July 1801
26	Wednesday; 15 July 1801
27	Thursday; 16 July 1801
28	Friday; 17 July 1801
29	Saturday; 18 July 1801
30	Sunday; 19 July 1801

Decimal time – 10 h/day
Paris
0:52:55

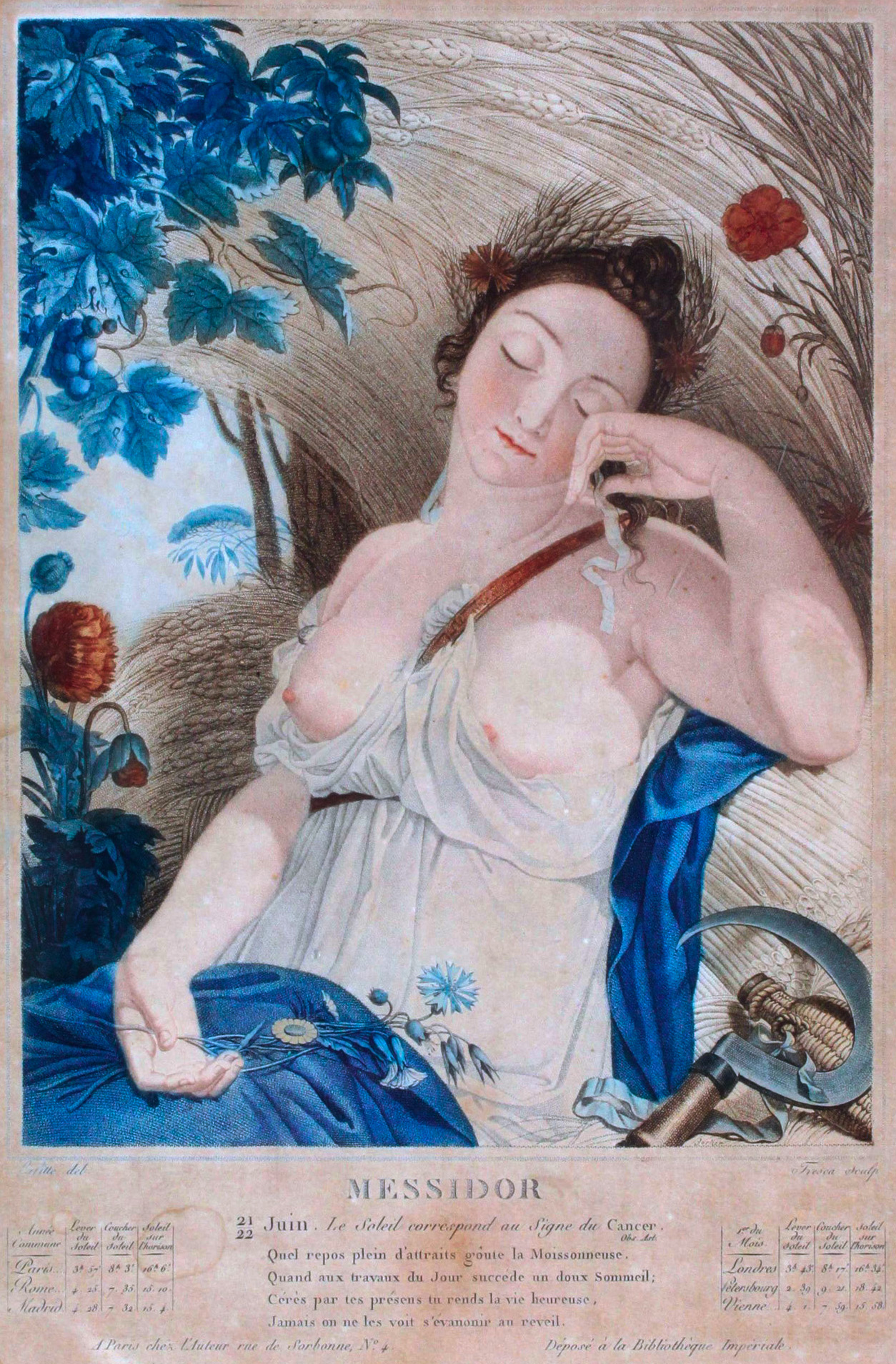
Messidor

01:15:41
Time of day - 24 h/day
Greenwich

Year: 10
Month: Messidor
Year: X

Day of the 10-day
week (décade)
Primidi
Duodi
Tridi
Quartidi
Quintidi
Sextidi
Septidi
Octidi
Nonidi
Décadi

décade 28
1	Sunday; 20 June 1802
2	Monday; 21 June 1802
3	Tuesday; 22 June 1802
4	Wednesday; 23 June 1802
5	Thursday; 24 June 1802
6	Friday; 25 June 1802
7	Saturday; 26 June 1802
8	Sunday; 27 June 1802
9	Monday; 28 June 1802
10	Tuesday; 29 June 1802

décade 29
11	Wednesday; 30 June 1802
12	Thursday; 1 July 1802
13	Friday; 2 July 1802
14	Saturday; 3 July 1802
15	Sunday; 4 July 1802
16	Monday; 5 July 1802
17	Tuesday; 6 July 1802
18	Wednesday; 7 July 1802
19	Thursday; 8 July 1802
20	Friday; 9 July 1802

décade 30
21	Saturday; 10 July 1802
22	Sunday; 11 July 1802
23	Monday; 12 July 1802
24	Tuesday; 13 July 1802
25	Wednesday; 14 July 1802
26	Thursday; 15 July 1802
27	Friday; 16 July 1802
28	Saturday; 17 July 1802
29	Sunday; 18 July 1802
30	Monday; 19 July 1802

Decimal time – 10 h/day
Paris
0:52:55

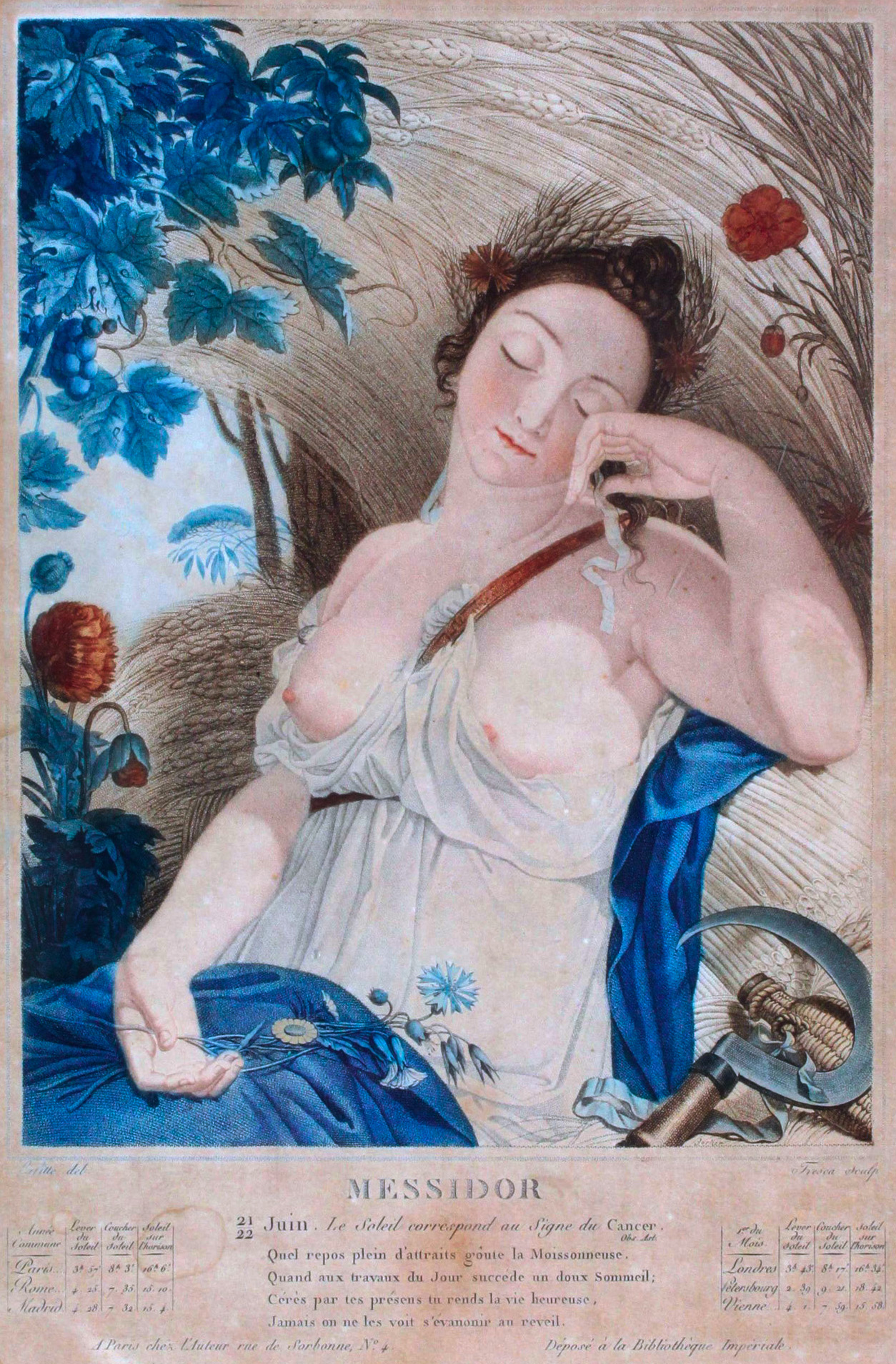
Messidor

01:15:41
Time of day - 24 h/day
Greenwich

Year: 11
Month: Messidor
Year: XI

Day of the 10-day
week (décade)
Primidi
Duodi
Tridi
Quartidi
Quintidi
Sextidi
Septidi
Octidi
Nonidi
Décadi

décade 28
1	Monday; 20 June 1803
2	Tuesday; 21 June 1803
3	Wednesday; 22 June 1803
4	Thursday; 23 June 1803
5	Friday; 24 June 1803
6	Saturday; 25 June 1803
7	Sunday; 26 June 1803
8	Monday; 27 June 1803
9	Tuesday; 28 June 1803
10	Wednesday; 29 June 1803

décade 29
11	Thursday; 30 June 1803
12	Friday; 1 July 1803
13	Saturday; 2 July 1803
14	Sunday; 3 July 1803
15	Monday; 4 July 1803
16	Tuesday; 5 July 1803
17	Wednesday; 6 July 1803
18	Thursday; 7 July 1803
19	Friday; 8 July 1803
20	Saturday; 9 July 1803

décade 30
21	Sunday; 10 July 1803
22	Monday; 11 July 1803
23	Tuesday; 12 July 1803
24	Wednesday; 13 July 1803
25	Thursday; 14 July 1803
26	Friday; 15 July 1803
27	Saturday; 16 July 1803
28	Sunday; 17 July 1803
29	Monday; 18 July 1803
30	Tuesday; 19 July 1803

Decimal time – 10 h/day
Paris
0:52:55

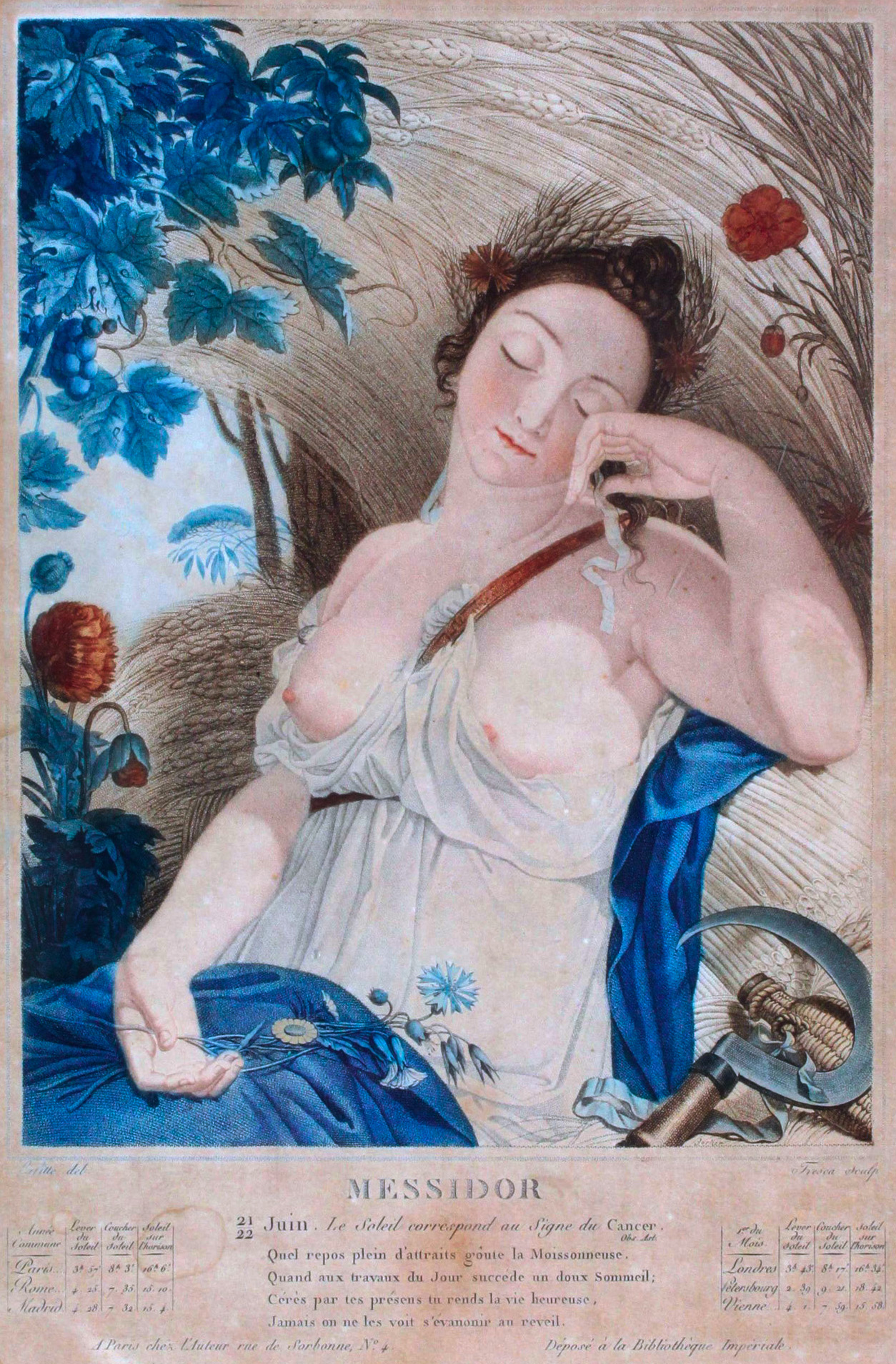
Messidor

01:15:41
Time of day - 24 h/day
Greenwich

Year: 12
Month: Messidor
Year: XII

Day of the 10-day
week (décade)
Primidi
Duodi
Tridi
Quartidi
Quintidi
Sextidi
Septidi
Octidi
Nonidi
Décadi

décade 28
1	Wednesday; 20 June 1804
2	Thursday; 21 June 1804
3	Friday; 22 June 1804
4	Saturday; 23 June 1804
5	Sunday; 24 June 1804
6	Monday; 25 June 1804
7	Tuesday; 26 June 1804
8	Wednesday; 27 June 1804
9	Thursday; 28 June 1804
10	Friday; 29 June 1804

décade 29
11	Saturday; 30 June 1804
12	Sunday; 1 July 1804
13	Monday; 2 July 1804
14	Tuesday; 3 July 1804
15	Wednesday; 4 July 1804
16	Thursday; 5 July 1804
17	Friday; 6 July 1804
18	Saturday; 7 July 1804
19	Sunday; 8 July 1804
20	Monday; 9 July 1804

décade 30
21	Tuesday; 10 July 1804
22	Wednesday; 11 July 1804
23	Thursday; 12 July 1804
24	Friday; 13 July 1804
25	Saturday; 14 July 1804
26	Sunday; 15 July 1804
27	Monday; 16 July 1804
28	Tuesday; 17 July 1804
29	Wednesday; 18 July 1804
30	Thursday; 19 July 1804

Decimal time – 10 h/day
Paris
0:52:55

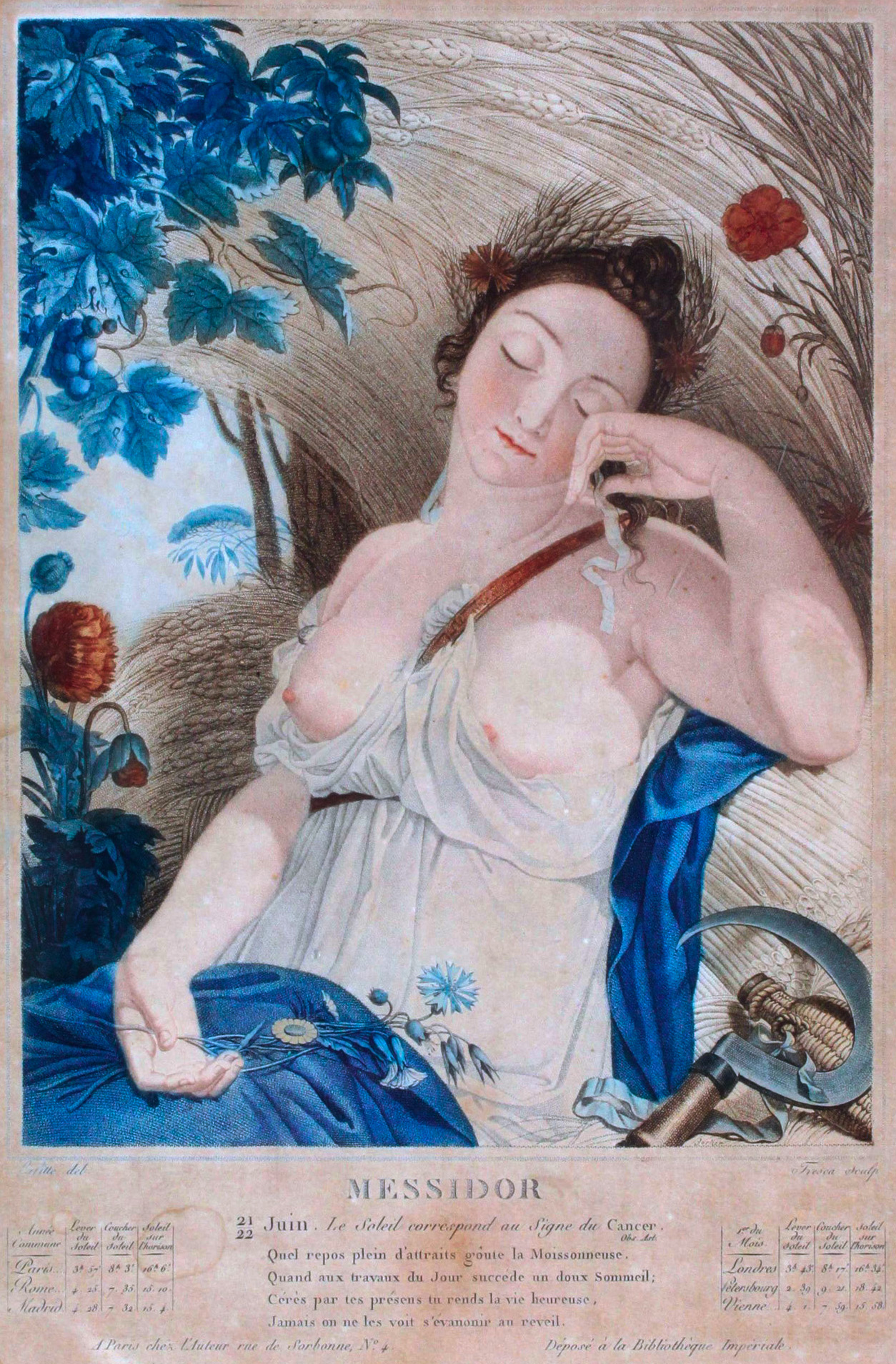
Messidor

01:15:41
Time of day - 24 h/day
Greenwich

Year: 13
Month: Messidor
Year: XIII

Day of the 10-day
week (décade)
Primidi
Duodi
Tridi
Quartidi
Quintidi
Sextidi
Septidi
Octidi
Nonidi
Décadi

décade 28
1	Thursday; 20 June 1805
2	Friday; 21 June 1805
3	Saturday; 22 June 1805
4	Sunday; 23 June 1805
5	Monday; 24 June 1805
6	Tuesday; 25 June 1805
7	Wednesday; 26 June 1805
8	Thursday; 27 June 1805
9	Friday; 28 June 1805
10	Saturday; 29 June 1805

décade 29
11	Sunday; 30 June 1805
12	Monday; 1 July 1805
13	Tuesday; 2 July 1805
14	Wednesday; 3 July 1805
15	Thursday; 4 July 1805
16	Friday; 5 July 1805
17	Saturday; 6 July 1805
18	Sunday; 7 July 1805
19	Monday; 8 July 1805
20	Tuesday; 9 July 1805

décade 30
21	Wednesday; 10 July 1805
22	Thursday; 11 July 1805
23	Friday; 12 July 1805
24	Saturday; 13 July 1805
25	Sunday; 14 July 1805
26	Monday; 15 July 1805
27	Tuesday; 16 July 1805
28	Wednesday; 17 July 1805
29	Thursday; 18 July 1805
30	Friday; 19 July 1805

Decimal time – 10 h/day
Paris
0:52:55

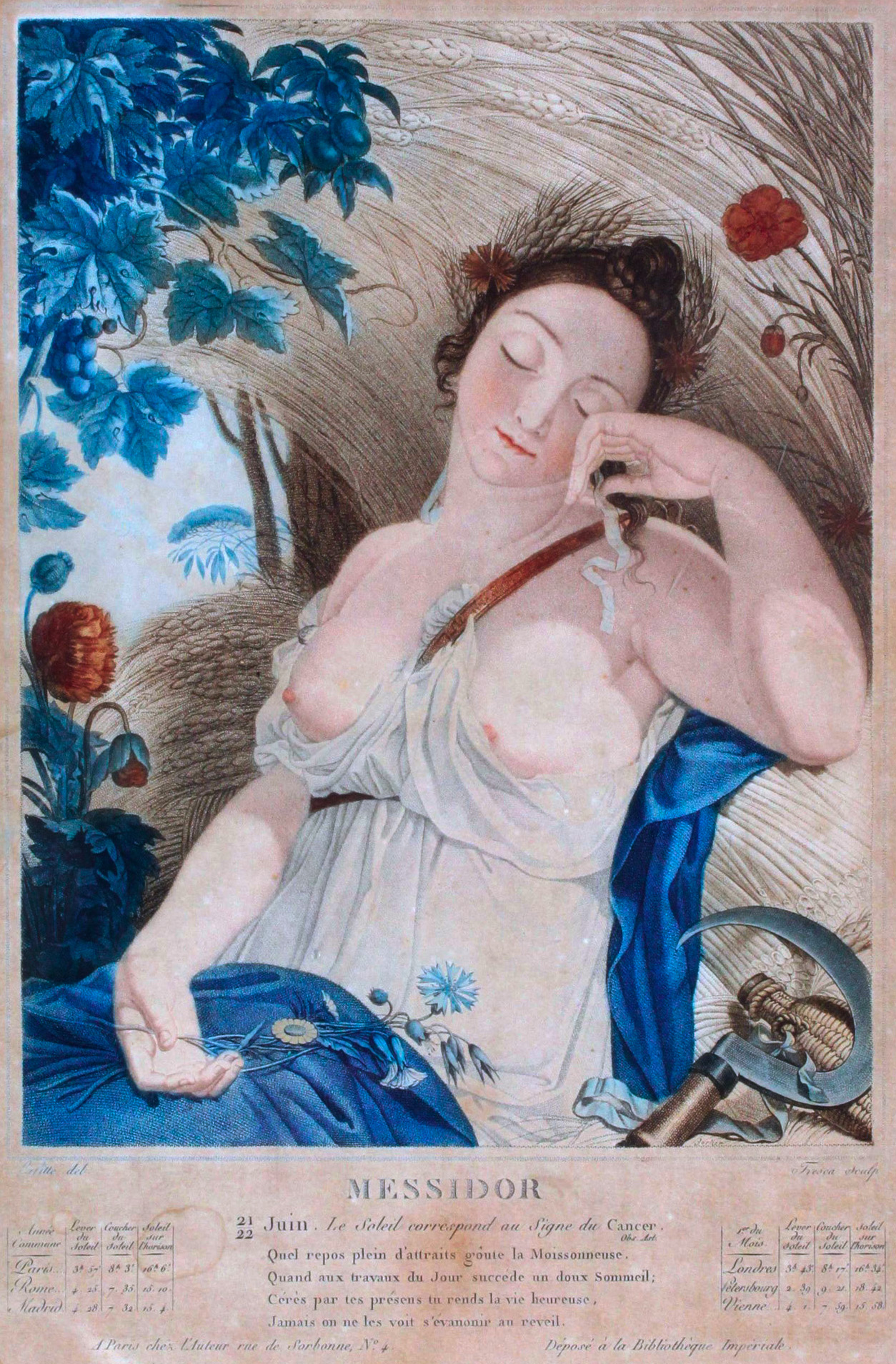
Messidor

01:15:41
Time of day - 24 h/day
Greenwich

Year: 14
Month: Messidor
Year: XIV

Day of the 10-day
week (décade)
Primidi
Duodi
Tridi
Quartidi
Quintidi
Sextidi
Septidi
Octidi
Nonidi
Décadi

décade 28
1	Friday; 20 June 1806
2	Saturday; 21 June 1806
3	Sunday; 22 June 1806
4	Monday; 23 June 1806
5	Tuesday; 24 June 1806
6	Wednesday; 25 June 1806
7	Thursday; 26 June 1806
8	Friday; 27 June 1806
9	Saturday; 28 June 1806
10	Sunday; 29 June 1806

décade 29
11	Monday; 30 June 1806
12	Tuesday; 1 July 1806
13	Wednesday; 2 July 1806
14	Thursday; 3 July 1806
15	Friday; 4 July 1806
16	Saturday; 5 July 1806
17	Sunday; 6 July 1806
18	Monday; 7 July 1806
19	Tuesday; 8 July 1806
20	Wednesday; 9 July 1806

décade 30
21	Thursday; 10 July 1806
22	Friday; 11 July 1806
23	Saturday; 12 July 1806
24	Sunday; 13 July 1806
25	Monday; 14 July 1806
26	Tuesday; 15 July 1806
27	Wednesday; 16 July 1806
28	Thursday; 17 July 1806
29	Friday; 18 July 1806
30	Saturday; 19 July 1806

Decimal time – 10 h/day
Paris
0:52:55

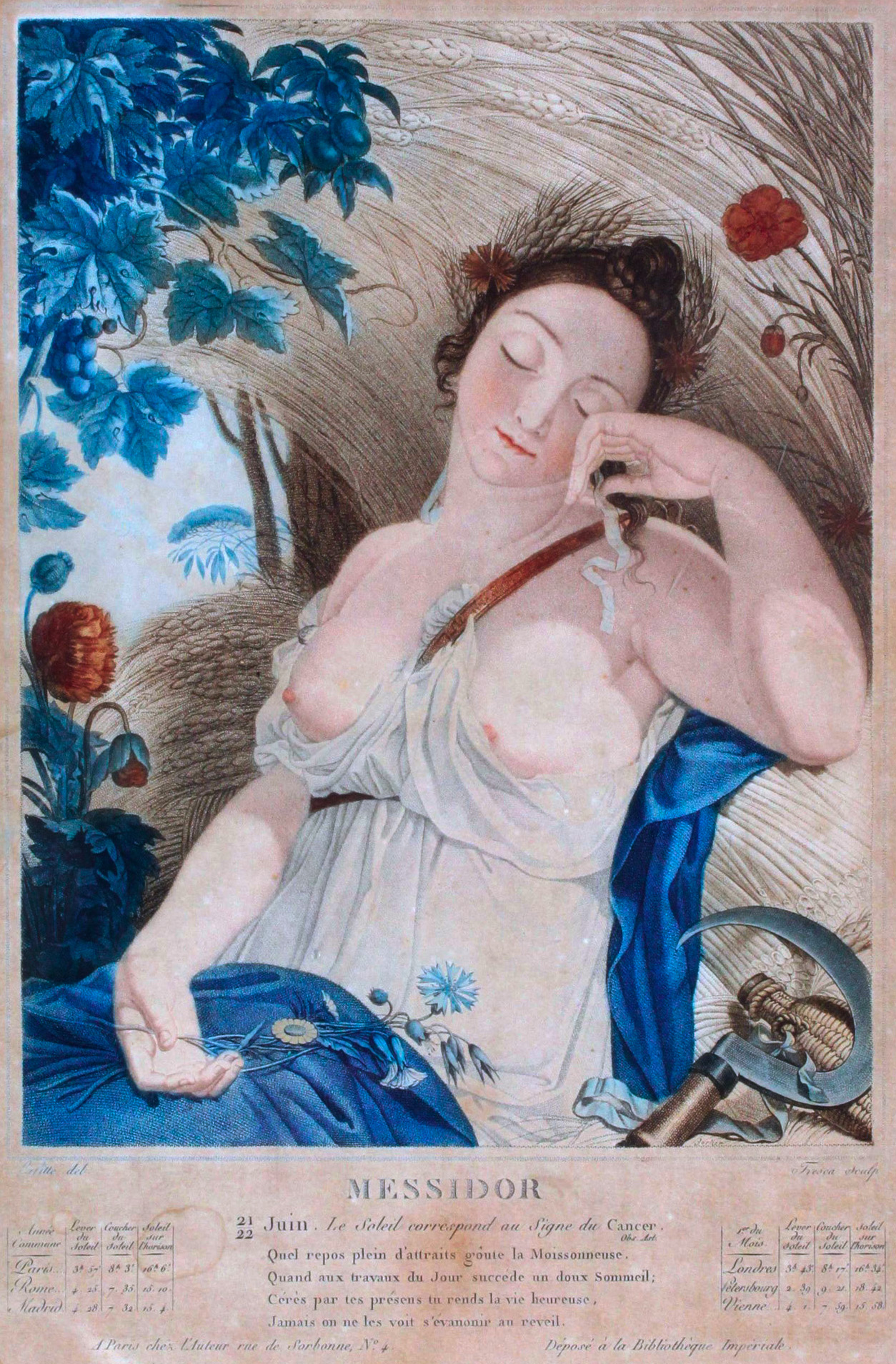
Messidor

01:15:41
Time of day - 24 h/day
Greenwich

== Day name table ==
Like all FRC months Messidor lasted 30 days and was divided into three 10-day weeks called décades (decades). Every day had the name of an agricultural plant, except the 5th (Quintidi) and 10th day (Decadi) of every decade, which had the name of a domestic animal (Quintidi) or an agricultural tool (Decadi).

	1^{re} Décade		2^{e} Décade		3^{e} Décade
Primidi	1.	Seigle (Rye)	11.	Coriandre (Coriander)	21.	Menthe (Mint)
Duodi	2.	Avoine (Oats)	12.	Artichaut (Artichoke)	22.	Cumin (Caraway)
Tridi	3.	Oignon (Onion)	13.	Giroflée (Clove)	23.	Haricot (Bean)
Quartidi	4.	Véronique (Speedwell)	14.	Lavande (Lavender)	24.	Orcanète (Alkanet)
Quintidi	5.	Mulet (Mule)	15.	Chamois (Chamois)	25.	Pintade (Guinea fowl)
Sextidi	6.	Romarin (Rosemary)	16.	Tabac (Tobacco)	26.	Sauge (Sage)
Septidi	7.	Concombre (Cucumber)	17.	Groseille (Currant)	27.	Aïl (Garlic)
Octidi	8.	Échalotte (Shallot)	18.	Cesse (Vetchling)	28.	Vesce (Vetch)
Nonidi	9.	Absynthe (Wormwood)	19.	Cerise (Cherry)	29.	Blé (Wheat)
Decadi	10.	Faucille (Sickle)	20.	Parc (Fold)	30.	Chalémie (Shawm)

== Conversion table ==
Table for conversion between Republican and Gregorian Calendar
for the month "Messidor"

I. / II. / III. / IV. / V. / VI. / VII.
1	2	3	4	5	6	7	8	9	10	11	12	13	14	15	16	17	18	19	20	21	22	23	24	25	26	27	28	29	30
19	20	21	22	23	24	25	26	27	28	29	30	1	2	3	4	5	6	7	8	9	10	11	12	13	14	15	16	17	18
June / 1793 / 1794 / 1795 / 1796 / 1797 / 1798 / 1799 / July

VIII. / IX. / X. / XI. / XII. / XIII.
1	2	3	4	5	6	7	8	9	10	11	12	13	14	15	16	17	18	19	20	21	22	23	24	25	26	27	28	29	30
20	21	22	23	24	25	26	27	28	29	30	1	2	3	4	5	6	7	8	9	10	11	12	13	14	15	16	17	18	19
June / 1800 / 1801 / 1802 / 1803 / 1804 / 1805 / July
