= Courrier d'Avignon =

Periodical literature

The Courrier d'Avignon was a newspaper which had an important role in the international French-language press of the 18th century. Published in the papal enclave within the kingdom of France, then in Monaco, it escaped the system controlling the press within France itself (privilege with permission) despite being under papal control. It appeared from 1733 to 1793 with two breaks, the first between July 1768 and August 1769 due to Avignon's annexation by France and the second between 30 November 1790 and 24 May 1791.
