= Joseph Bara =

French soldier (1779-1793)

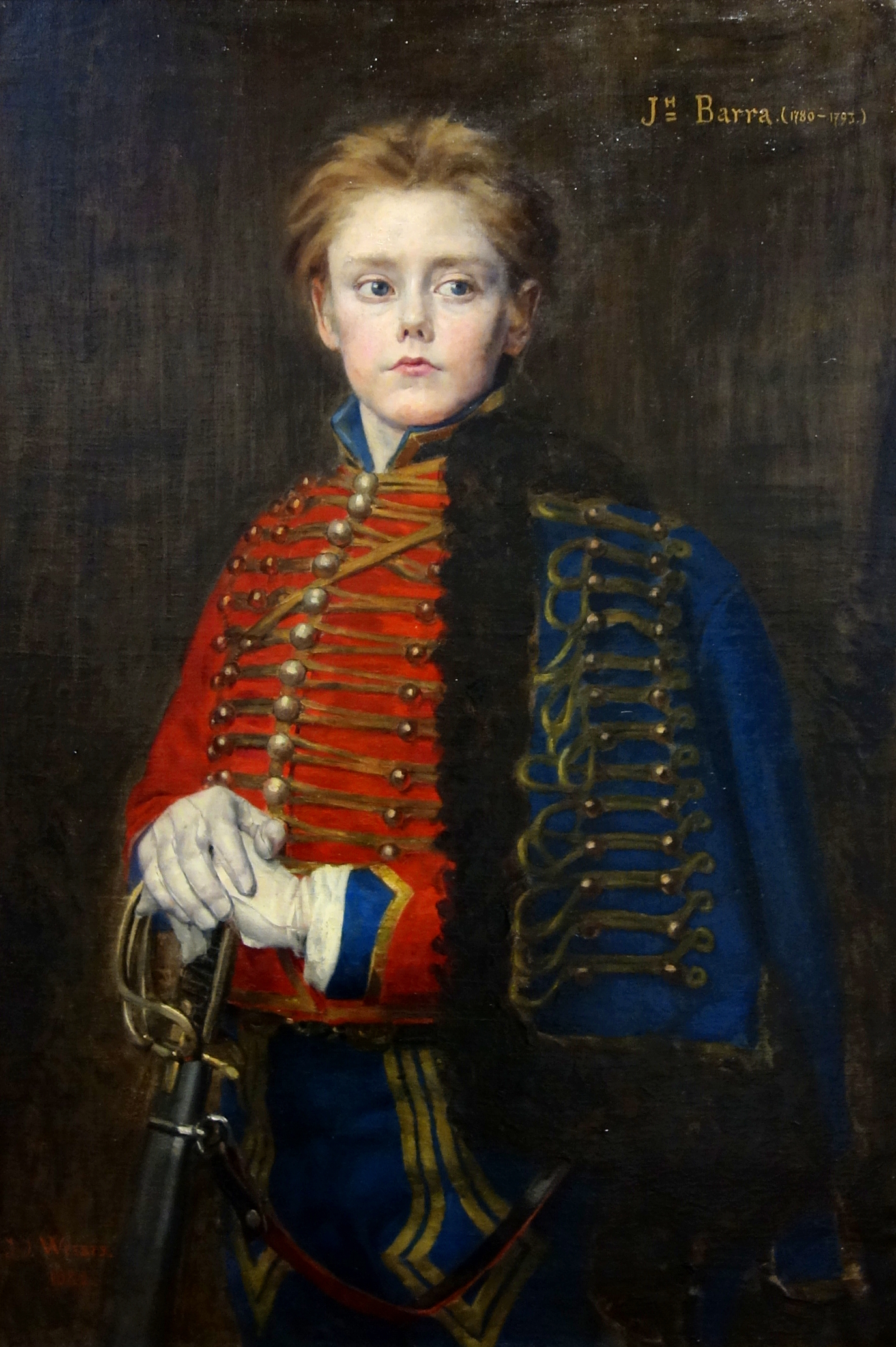
1882 portrait of Bara by Jean-Joseph Weerts

François Joseph Bara (30 July 1779 – 7 December 1793) was a French soldier best known for his death during the War in the Vendée. At the age of twelve, he joined the French Revolutionary Army as a drummer boy after the outbreak of French Revolutionary Wars, and was killed by Chouan rebels while defending a pair of horses he was leading. Bara was transformed after his death into a martyr for the French Revolution and has been depicted in several works of art.

== Life, death, and legacy ==
François Joseph Bara was born on 30 July 1779 in Palaiseau. Bara's father was a gamekeeper, and his mother was a domestic servant. Both worked in the Palaiseau district for the Princes of Condé. When Bara was twelve, his father died, so when the Levée en masse was issued, his mother enlisted him in the French Revolutionary Army.

Bara was too young to join the French army, but despite this, he joined a unit fighting against Chouan rebels during the War in the Vendée as a drummer boy. After his death, General J. B. Desmarres gave this account, by letter, to the convention. "Yesterday this courageous youth, surrounded by brigands, chose to perish rather than give them the two horses he was leading."

The boy's death was seized on as an opportunity by the revolutionaries, who praised him at the Convention's tribune, saying that "only the French have thirteen-year-old heroes". But rather than simply being killed by rebels who solely wanted to steal horses, Bara was transformed into a figure who resisted the Ancien Régime at the cost of his death. His story became that, having been trapped by the enemy and being ordered to cry "Vive le Roi" ("Long live the King") to save his own life, he preferred instead to die crying "Vive la République" ("Long live the Republic").

His remains were to be transferred to the Panthéon during a revolutionary festival in his honour, but the event was cancelled when Robespierre was overthrown the day before it was to take place.

== Gallery ==
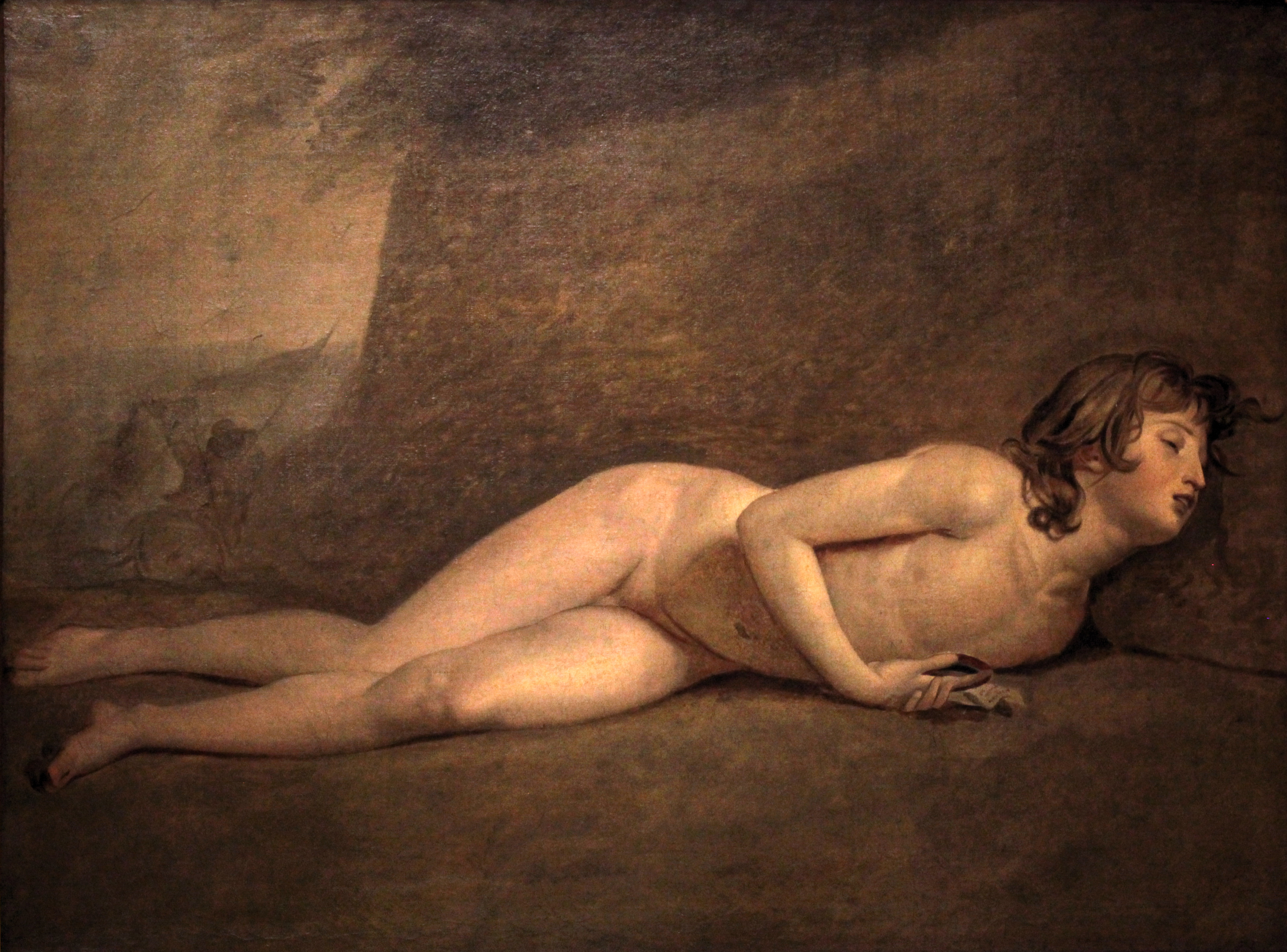
The Death of Young Bara (1794) by a pupil of Jacques-Louis David

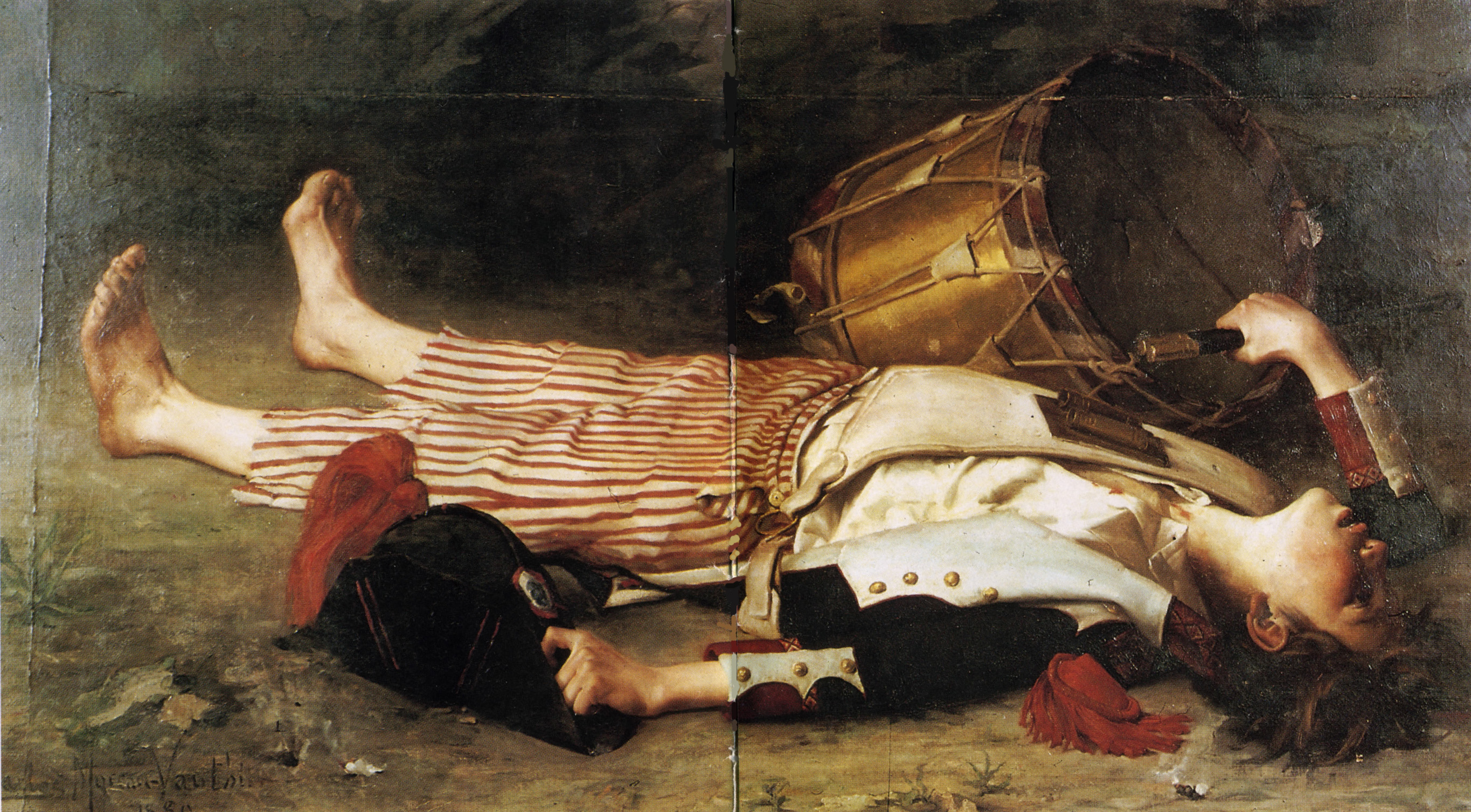
The Death of Bara (Charles Moreau-Vauthier, 1850)

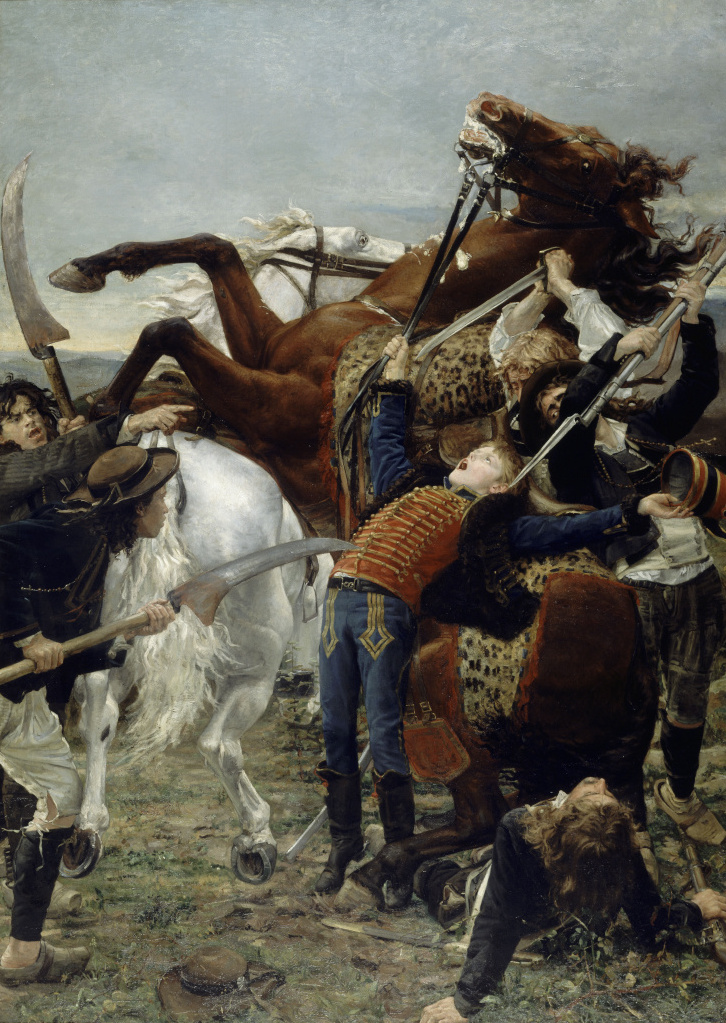
The Death of Bara (Jean-Joseph Weerts, 1880)

== Commemoration ==
- A 1794 painting by Jacques-Louis David depicts the dying Bara.
- A statue of Bara (called Barra) lying dead by David d'Angers in 1838.
- An 1883 painting (The Death of Bara) by Jean-Joseph Weerts also depicts Bara's death.
- A painting (La Mort de Bara) by Charles Moreau-Vauthier depicts Bara as a dead drummer boy.
- A painting (Bara) by Jean-Jacques Henner in 1882.
- A street in the 6th arrondissement of Paris is named after him.
- Bara is alluded to in the Chant du départ.
- A ship of the line of the French Navy was launched in 1794 with the name Barra in his honour.
- There is a statue in his honour at Palaiseau in the Southern suburbs of Paris.
- Opera "Joseph Barra" (1794) by André Ernest Modeste Grétry.
