= The Death of Young Bara =

Incomplete 1794 painting by Jacques-Louis David

The Death of Bara (La Mort de Bara)
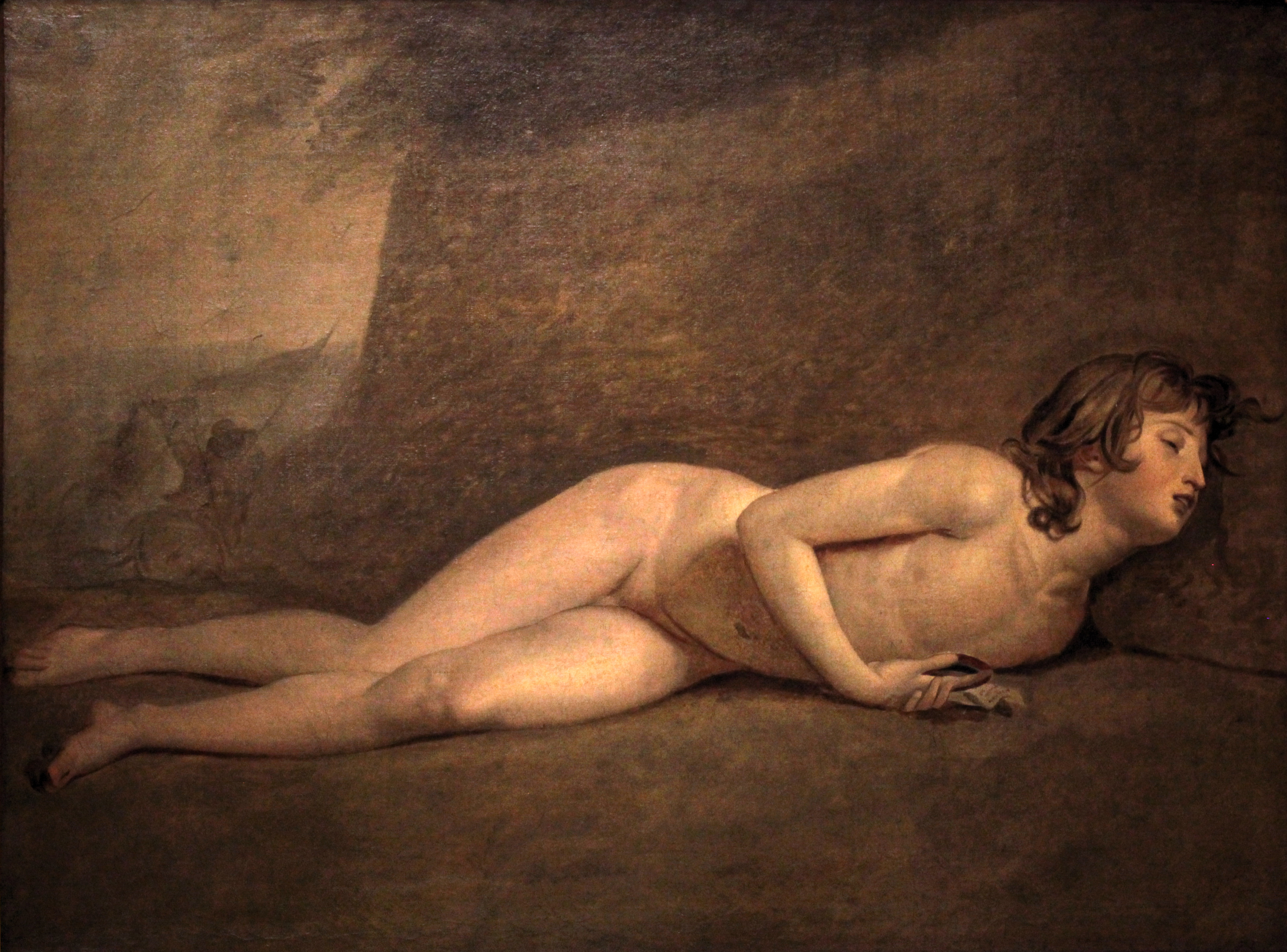
- Artist: Jacques-Louis David
- Year: 1794
- Medium: Oil on canvas
- Dimensions: 47 1/4 × 61 13/16 in. (120 × 157 cm) Framed: 57 1/2 × 71 5/8 in. (146 × 182 cm)
- Location: Place du château, Vizille, Dept. of Isère, Auvergne-Rhône-Alpes
- Accession: SL.6.2016.4.1

The Death of Young Bara, Joseph Bara or The Death of Bara is an incomplete 1794 oil painting on canvas by the French Neoclassical artist Jacques-Louis David, now in the musée Calvet in Avignon. Joseph Bara, a young drummer in the army of the French First Republic, was killed by the Vendéens, French Royalists. David portrays the last moments of the boy and forms a narrative around the story that radically dramatized the circumstances of Bara's death, in accordance with Robespierre's pro-revolutionary propaganda. The Death of Bara belonged to a series of David's paintings depicting the revolution's heroes and martyrs along with The Death of Marat and The Last Moments of Michel Lepeletier.

== Context ==
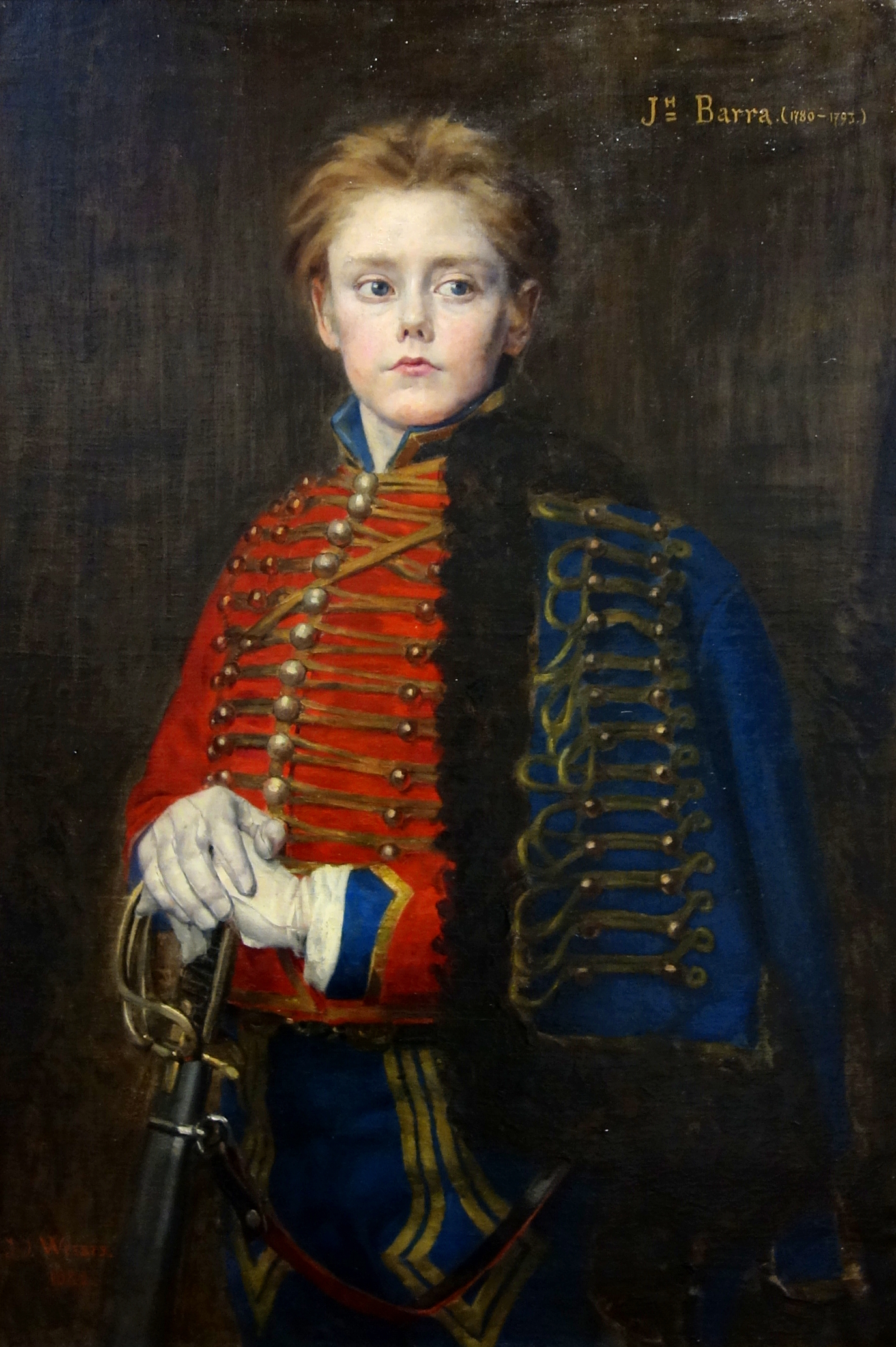
1882 portrait of Bara by Jean-Joseph Weerts

The winter of 1793–1794 was hard for French revolutionaries; the complexities of the revolution began to multiply as Maximilien Robespierre struggled to hold on to power. However, the death of twelve-year-old Joseph Bara was interpreted as a beacon of hope that offered the revolution a new sense of dedication and unification.

Bara was too young to enlist in the revolutionary army, but was "burning to serve", according to General J.B. Desmarres, to whom Bara was an assistant at the time of his death. Desmarres reported that Bara sacrificed his life instead of turning over a pair of horses to the opposing army. Robespierre saw Bara's death as an opportunity to unite the French Revolutionaries and convinced his followers that Bara gave his life in reaction to pro-Monarchists yelling "vive le roi", to which Bara allegedly responded "Vive la République", perishing in the ensuing spat. In his own personal report of these events, Robespierre elevates the death of Bara to serve as a model of undying and almost blind support of the French Republic, glory, virtue and fatherhood.

Robespierre enlisted the help of David in paying tribute to Bara's death with the intention that the painting would represent "absolute virtue, simple and modest, as it is delivered from the hands of Nature". Robespierre wanted the image reproduced in schools to motivate school children to join the Republic's forces, according to Robespierre's political contemporary Bertrand Barere.

David took on the task of painting Bara, as well as Lepelletier and Marat, with the intent of drawing upon themes of suffering and pity. His painting of Bara demonstrates a commitment to displaying feelings of pride, sorrow, and pain resulting from the revolution, reflecting sentiments held by both the rebels and of David himself.

== Content ==
The unfinished painting displays only the naked body of an androgynous figure lying horizontally, grasping a letter and a red, white, and blue cockade. Bara's body separates the composition horizontally, dividing the background and foreground. The body stands mostly alone; a small silhouette on the far left provides the only details alluding to the narrative of the stolen horses.

The desolate image suggests a cold winter, with the tones of gray and brown forming a tumultuous and undefined backdrop. The massive space of scumbling above the figure of Bara contrasts with the smooth pale skin, lacking any sign of injury or blood. Bara's intact body proves his innocence through what the art historian Dorothy Johnson describes as "beauty without disruption"; the only implication of pain is Bara's tortured expression. While experts disagree on whether or not the painting is fully finished, a thin brown pigment made from a mixture of oil paint and thinner in a technique that is referred to as frotté, significant for its application in the early stages of the painting process, suggests the painting was incomplete.

== Analysis ==
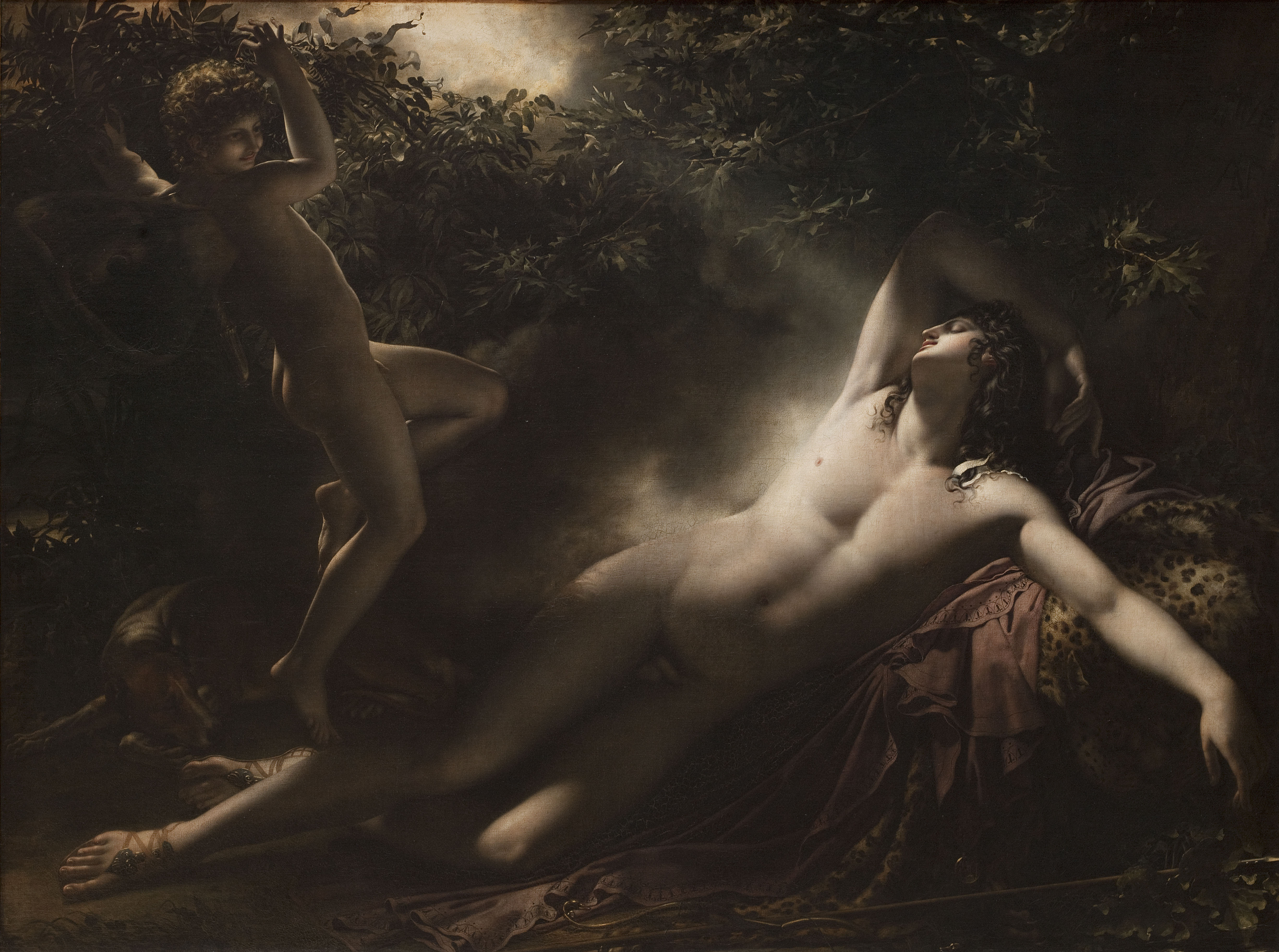
Girodet's The Sleep of Endymion

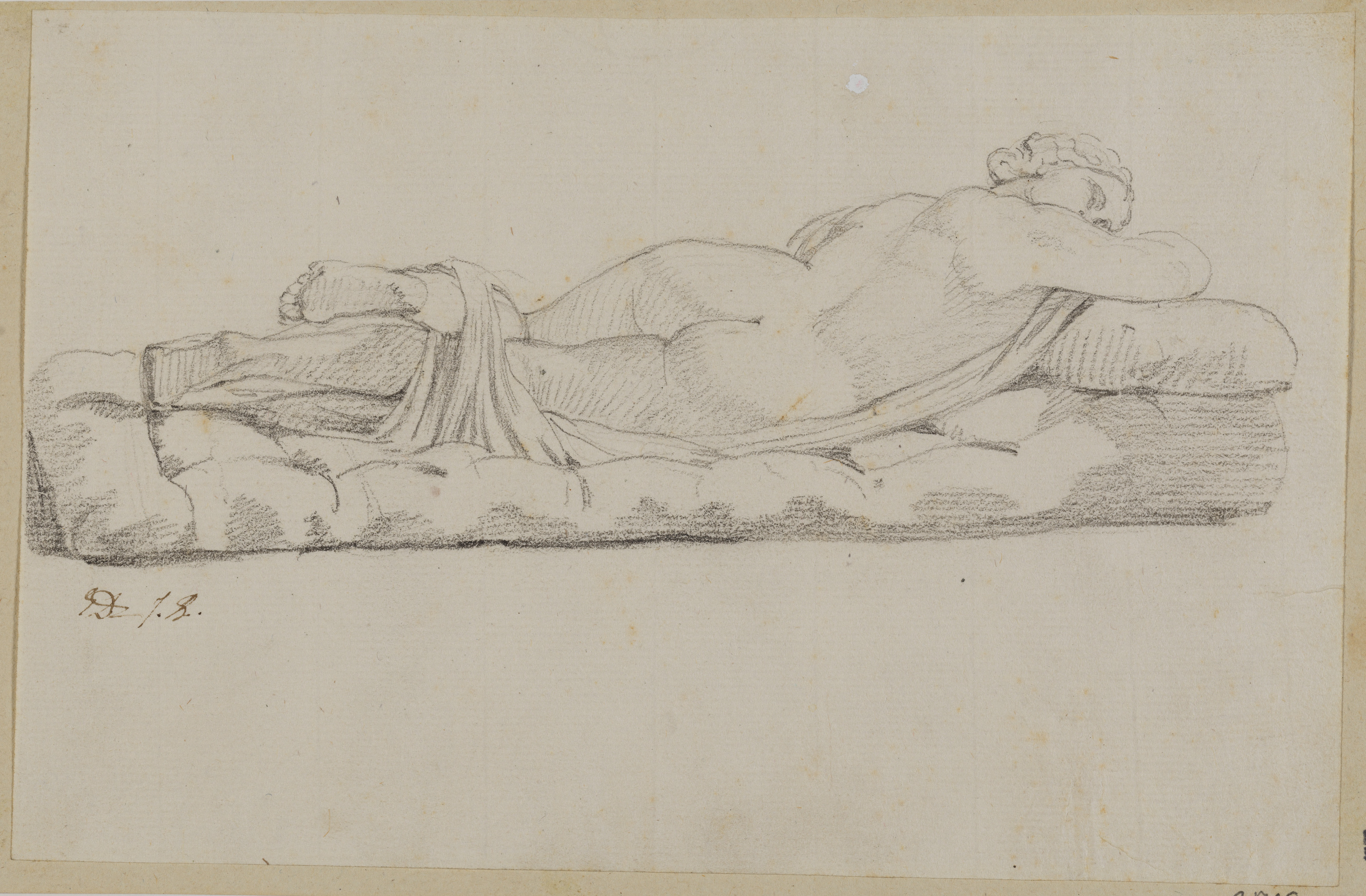
Hermaphrodite Sketch by Jacque-Louis David

David, in accordance with the revolutionary narrative derived from Robespierre, capitalizes on the innocence and youthfulness of Bara, suppressing Bara's masculinity and illuminating his effeminate figure. The painting remains unfinished, but the attention to detail in the shading and musculature suggests Bara was intended to be nude. Bara's pose, recalling both antiquity, such as the Hermaphrodite by Bernini, and the innovations of David's contemporaries, such as Girodet's The Sleep of Endymion, further emphasizes his curved hips, elongated torso, his figure's flowing hair, and absence of genitalia.

There are several ways to interpret Bara's nakedness. Some historians suggest it was a result of the Vendée brigand's stripping Bara of his clothing before leaving him to die, some even going as far as to suggest that the work implies a mutated narrative of a raped, pubescent female. Others see the body only as an allegory of revolutionary devotion and patriotism. It is apparent that David intended to give Bara a sensitive innocence that accentuated Bara's heroism and rebellious pride even in his soft, pale and almost feminine state. Thus David stated in a speech to the National Convention that he intended to contrast the youthful, innocent and feminine nature of Bara to "those effeminate sybarites [meaning young loyalists] whose corrupted souls prevent them from having any virtue and whose idle arms carry only numbers and accounts, testimony to their adulterous affairs."

The letter and cockade are small yet significant details. Most historians associate the letter with filial love, as it is assumed to be addressed to Bara's mother. This letter represents how Bara's mother not only would have benefitted monetarily from Bara's involvement in the revolution, but also represents another way in which Robespierre appropriated Bara's story as a heroic model, encouraging young French people who struggled to find a balance between family and civil duty. Additionally the cockade represents the tricolor symbol of the Republic and a metaphor for "l'amor de la patrie," or "the love of the homeland." Therefore David combines the sense of male outrage and patriotic love, with the sensitive filial love in the figural representation of these two symbols.

== See also ==
- List of paintings by Jacques-Louis David
- Bara (Henner)
- The painting is currently located at the Musee Calvet, in Avignon, France.
- An anonymous contemporary copy dating to 1794 is now in the Palais des Beaux-Arts de Lille and exhibited at the Musée de la Révolution française.

== Bibliography ==
- La Mort de Bara, foundation du muséum Calvet, Avignon, 1989
