= The Death of Bara =

1883 painting by Jean-Joseph Weerts

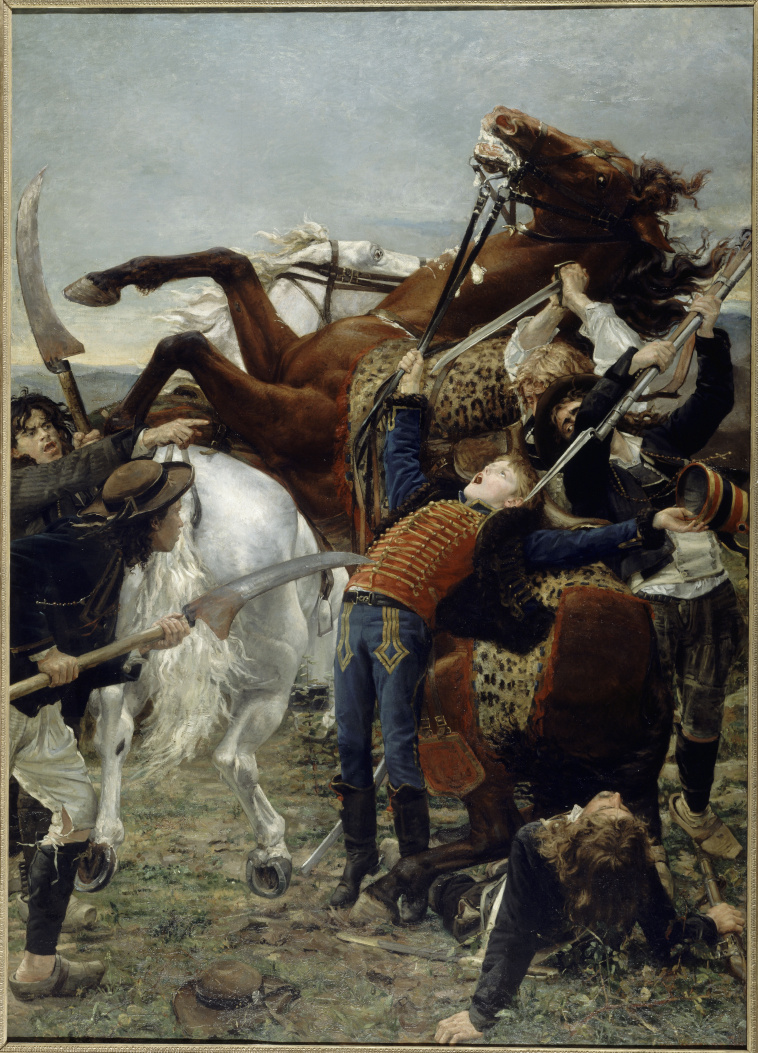
- Artist: Jean-Joseph Weerts
- Year: 1883
- Medium: oil painting
- Dimensions: 350 cm × 250 cm (140 in × 98 in)
- Location: Musée d'Orsay, Paris
- Accession: RF 570

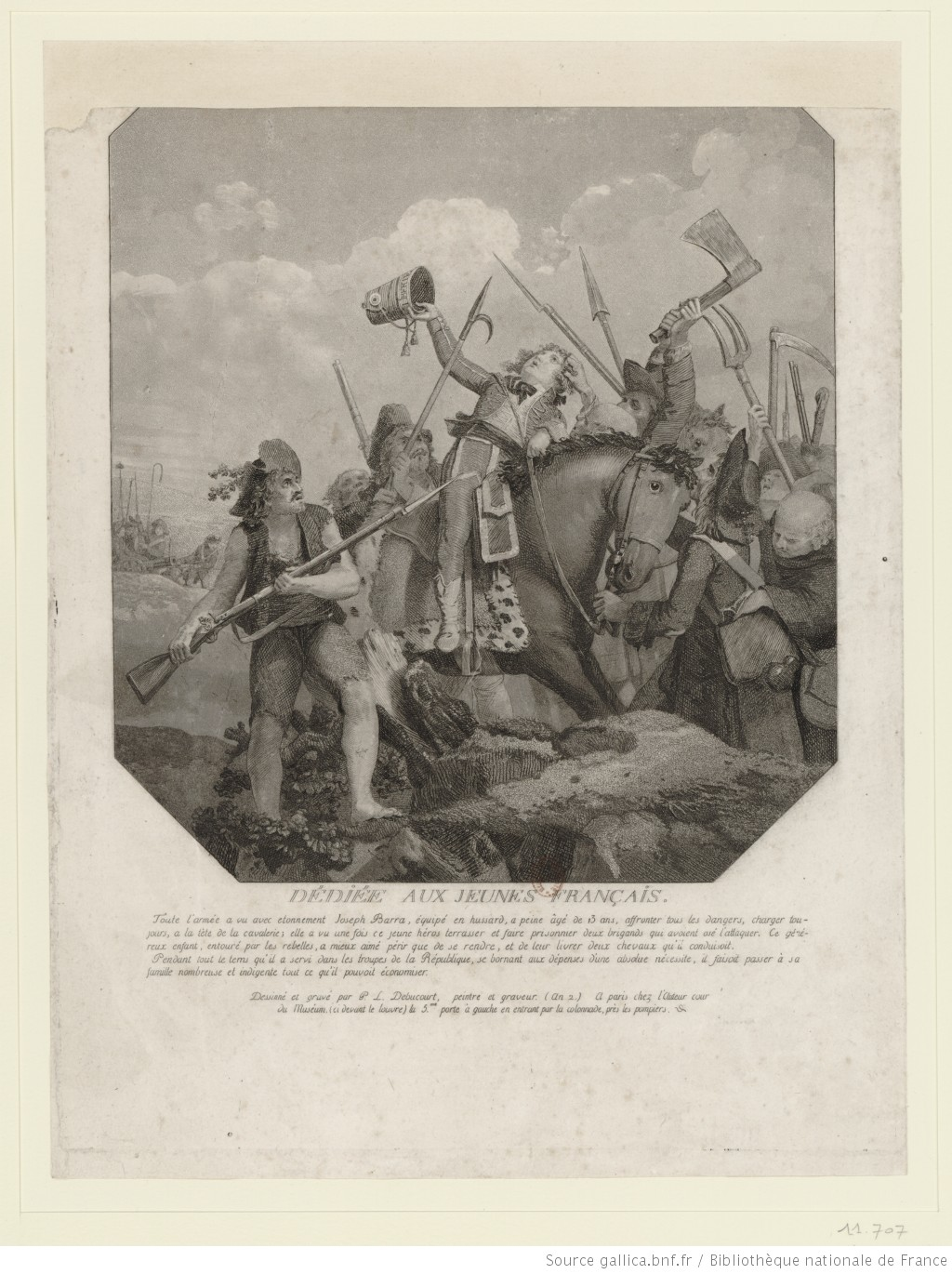
Heroic Death of Young Barra, dedicated to young Frenchmen

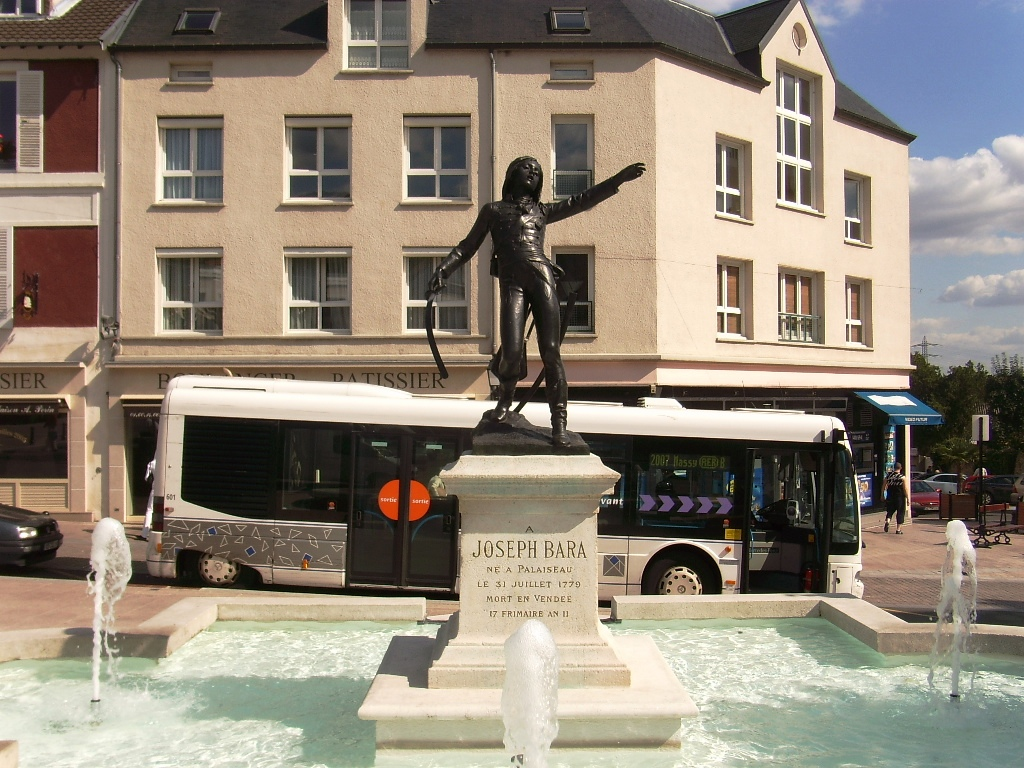
Albert-Lefeuvre’s statue of Bara in Palaiseau

The Death of Bara is a painting by Jean-Joseph Weerts, painted in 1883 and held at the Musée d'Orsay in Paris. It depicts the death of Joseph Bara, a boy-hero of the French Revolution, killed by Chouan rebels in 1793. It is an example of patriotic history painting and enjoyed great success, particularly in reproduction.

== Conception ==
To entrench the republican regime in France, the French Third Republic undertook a process of symbolic appropriation of the culture linked to the Revolution, and the revival of Bara's memory was part of this. In the early 1880s, several paintings depicting Bara were produced. This mobilisation of artists was carried out primarily under fr:Edmond Turquet, Under-Secretary of State for Fine Arts. Indeed in 1882 Weerts had already painted a portrait of Bara as a hussar (this painting is kept at La Piscine Museum in Roubaix). Weerts was deeply patriotic, saddened by the defeat in the Franco-Prussian War, and sincerely attached to republican values. Developing a new, large-scale canvas was his response to the call from his government for new work on suitable themes.

Weerts may have been inspired by a 1794 print by Philibert-Louis Debucourt, entitled Heroic Death of Young Barra, dedicated to young Frenchmen. The similarities in the composition and the movements of the figures, are indeed remarkable.

== Execution ==
The scene presented by Weerts is very to that of the angelic youth painted by Jacques-Louis David in The Death of Young Bara, or from the recumbent figures depicted in previous years by fr:Charles Moreau-Vauthier in The Death of Joseph Bara (1880) and Jean-Jacques Henner in Bara (1882). These works all represent the moment after that depicted by Weerts, when Bara was dying or already dead.

In contrast, in Weerts' painting, Bara is captured just before death in his hussar uniform. He is surrounded by three young Vendéans who are about to pierce him with their already bloodied weapons. In the background are the horses that, according to fr: Jean-Baptiste Desmarres’ letter to the National Convention, Bara was leading when he was attacked. Weerts thus depicts Bara in motion, falling toward his death, just as Louis Albert-Lefeuvre had done with his statue unveiled in Palaiseau two years earlier.

The Vendéans surrounding him seem to hesitate before plunging their blades into the body of the child, whose face is illuminated.

According to journalist and art critic Louis Énault :

“The psychological moment, which he knew how to choose well, provided [Jean-Joseph Weerts] with a very dramatic motif, which he treated with great energy and fervor. There is something truly poignant in this slaughter of children, who tear each other apart with bayonets and scythes."

Exalting patriotic sacrifice, the painting depicts Bara in a crucified pose, contrasted with the brutality of the Vendéans, who are unkempt, dressed in peasant clothing, and wearing wide-brimmed hats. Their faces are barely discernible. More specifically, the scene refers to the legend claiming that, ordered to shout "Long live the King," Bara refused, shouting "Long live the Republic”. (This embellishment of the likely historical reality is primarily the work of Maximilien Robespierre).

== Reception and significance ==
Presented at the Salon of 1883, this painting earned Weerts the Legion of Honour. It was first exhibited at the Élysée Palace during the Exposition Universelle (1889), then at the Musée du Luxembourg. From 1926 to 1979, it hung in the Haut-Rhin prefecture in Colmar, then the Palaiseau town hall from 1979 to 1986. It was added to the collections of the Musée d'Orsay in 1986.

Shortly after its creation, it was reproduced using photogravure, and the hundreds of thousands of printed copies were sent to schools and displayed on classroom walls. These reproductions were used by the Third Republic to present Bara to schoolchildren as a heroic political and educational model.

This engraving was also reproduced in newspapers as early as 1883, for example in a September issue of L'Estafette lorraine, and in a supplement to the Breton republican newspaper Le Finistère. The image was so enduring that we find a reproduction of Weerts' painting in 1947 on one of the pages of the calendar in the newspaper L'Humanité. It was reproduced in elementary school textbooks until the 1960s.
