= The Last Moments of Michel Lepeletier =

Lost painting by Jacques-Louis David

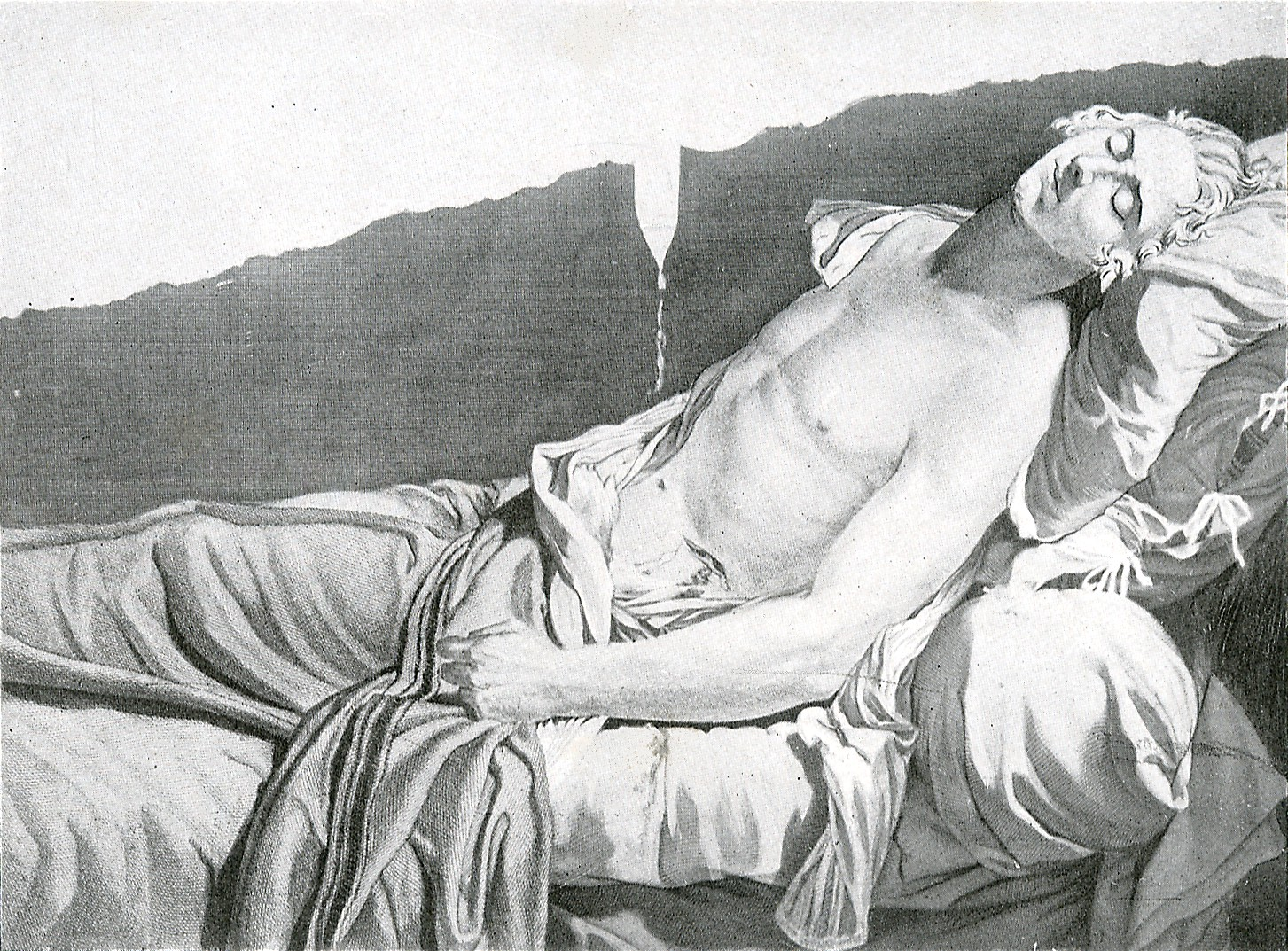
Engraving after David's painting

The Last Moments of Michel Lepeletier, The Death of Lepeletier de Saint-Fargeau or Lepeletier on his Deathbed was a 1793 painting by the French artist Jacques-Louis David.

Now lost, it showed député Louis-Michel Lepeletier de Saint-Fargeau on his deathbed following his assassination for voting in favour of the execution of Louis XVI and formed a diptych with The Death of Marat for the meeting hall of the National Convention. Those two paintings and The Death of Young Bara formed a series devoted to martyrs of the French Revolution.

It was removed in 1795 and entrusted to the artist, who still owned it on his death in Brussels. It was then sold by his family to the subject's daughter Louise Suzanne de Mortefontaine. After that sale it disappeared and most probably Louise destroyed it and as many engravings after it as possible in order to erase any trace of her father's part in the Revolution. It is only known through a drawing by Anatole Desvosge and an engraving by Tardieu which partially escaped destruction.

== See also ==
- List of paintings by Jacques-Louis David

== Sources ==
- Aristide Déy, Histoire de la ville et du comté de Saint-Fargeau, Perriquet et Rouillé, 1856
