= Pour l'Humanité, pour la Patrie =

Painting by Jean-Joseph Weerts

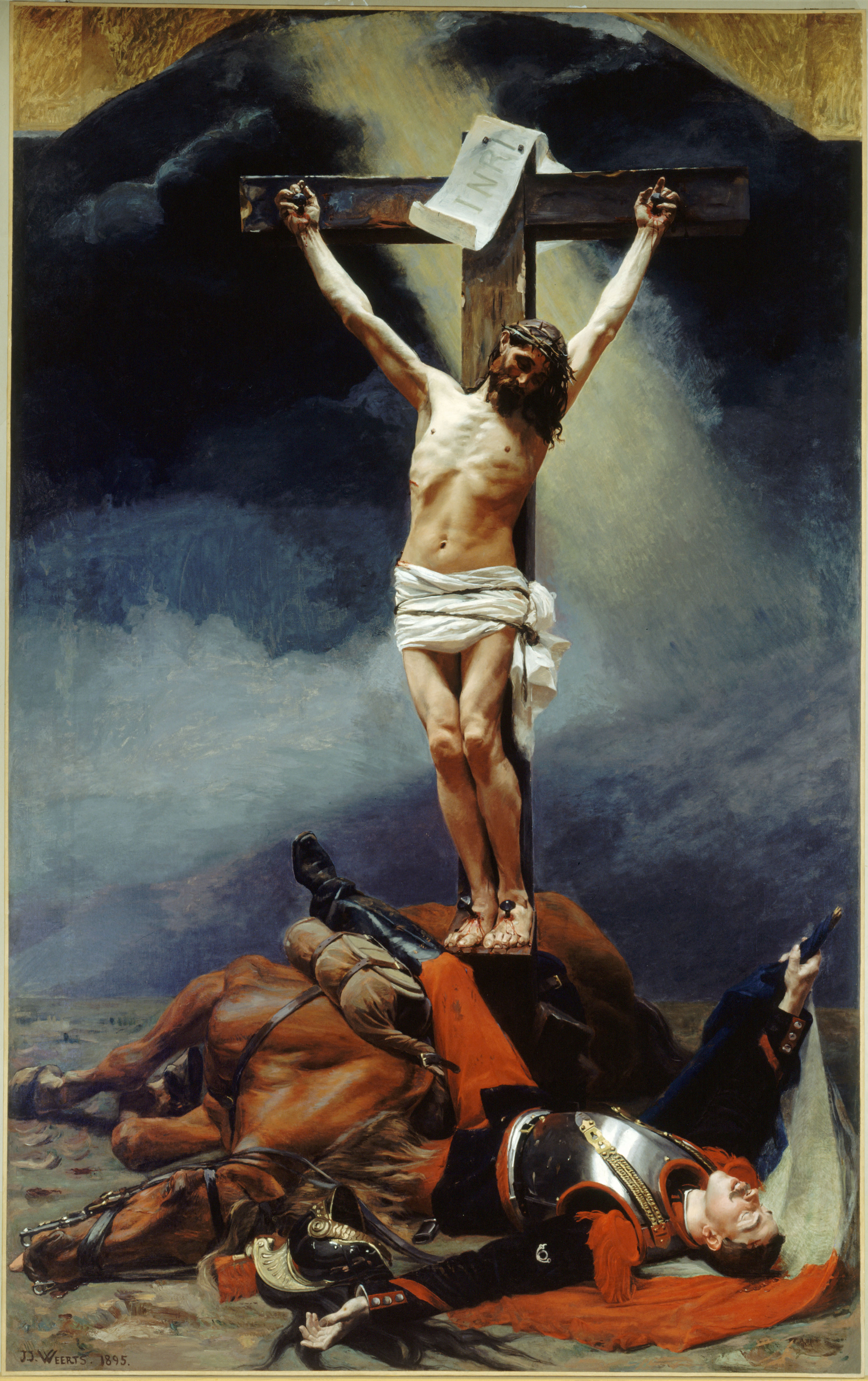
Jean Joseph Weerts - Pour l'Humanité, pour la Patrie - Musée des Beaux-Arts de la ville de Paris

Pour l'Humanité, pour la Patrie (tr: For Humanity, for the Fatherland) is an oil on canvas painting (385cm x 240cm) by Jean-Joseph Weerts, from 1895. It is part of the collection of the Petit Palais in Paris.

== Description ==
The painting depicts Jesus on the cross with a dead French cuirassier at his feet, lying on the tricolour. The sense of depth is enhanced by the position of the dead horse and the diagonal placing of the officer. The composition implies a parallel between Christ’s sacrifice for humanity and the soldier’s sacrifice for his fellow citizens. The juxtaposition of sacred and secular subjects within a single image might seem shocking, but Weerts’ refined academic technique perhaps serves to smooth the difference and make it appear normal.

The work was one of a number executed by Weerts on patriotic themes, such as France!! ou l'Alsace et la Lorraine désespérées (1905) and La France victorieuse, le châtiment (1918).

== History ==
The painting was originally exhibited at the Salon of 1895 where it met with little critical acclaim (one critic described it as an “infamy”). However an engraving by fr:Charles Baude allowed the image to reproduced at scale on devotional cards. Photographic versions were also circulated, and one was used as the cover image for Le Pèlerin on 28 March 1915. Indeed, even before the First World War Louis Mazuet had used the lower part of the painting as the basis for the design of a stained glass window at Dozulé in 1909, dedicated to the war of 1870.

The close identification of the soldier’s sacrifice with that of Christ was a new feature of culture of the Third Republic. After the disastrous defeat of the Franco-Prussian War, images sanctifying the soldier’s death as a religious sacrifice became increasingly common. The exhibition of Pour l’humanité. Pour la patrie at the salon of 1895 was a decisive step in the association of patriotic and religious sacrifice.
