= Bara (Henner) =

Painting by Jean-Jacques Henner

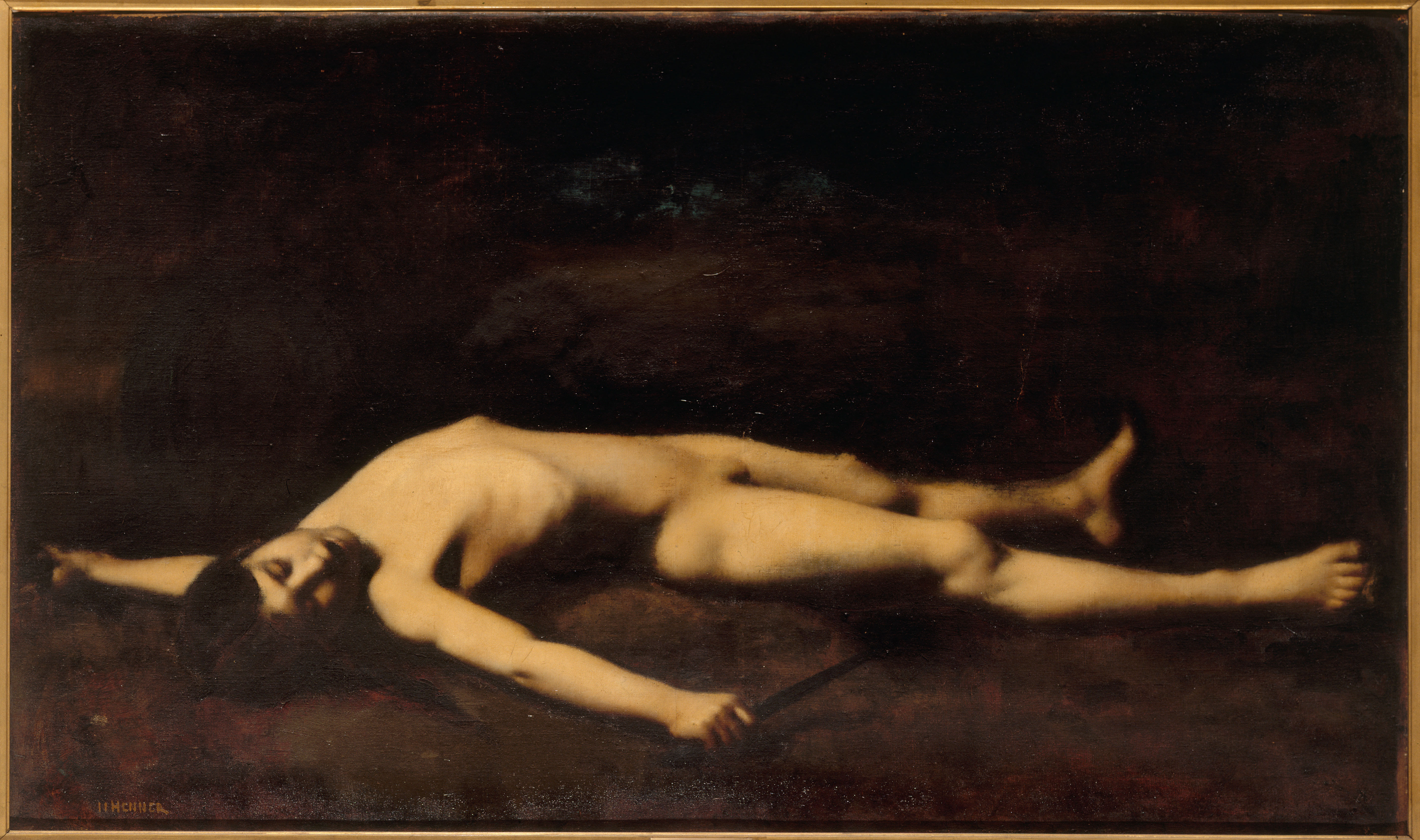
- Artist: Jean-Jacques Henner
- Year: 1882
- Medium: oil on canvas
- Dimensions: 144 cm × 85.5 cm (57 in ×)
- Location: Petit Palais; Paris

Bara (previously often spelled ’Barra’) is a painting by Jean-Jacques Henner exhibited at the Salon of 1882 and today part of the collection at the Petit Palais in Paris. It depicts a Republican boy-hero of the French Revolution, Joseph Bara, killed by the Vendeans in 1793.

== Description ==
The painting depicts the young Joseph Bara, laid out naked on the ground after his murder, against a brown background. His arms are stretched out, his head thrown back and his chest raised. A few drops of blood are spattered on his straggling hair. The pose is one of elegant and classical simplicity and aside from the indication of a wound to the head, the body is perfectly unblemished. There is clearly in his pose a reference to Jesus crucifixion. In Bara’s hand is a drumstick (according to the painting’s catalogue entry, a dagger) and the dimly distinguished form of a drum lies behind him on his left.

The theme of the painting is an unusual one for Henner, who more commonly painted mythological subjects; a subject from near-contemporary France, presented with such direct indication of physical violence, was atypical of him.

== History ==
In the early 1880s there was a great revival of interest in Bara, and both poems and sculptures of him were composed. In 1880 fr: Charles Moreau-Vauthier created his canvas fr:La Mort de Joseph Bara on the same subject. The same year as Henner exhibited his painting, Jean-Joseph Weerts presented a portrait of Bara, and one of the highlights of the 1883 salon the following year was Weerts’ historical painting The Death of Bara.

The painting remained in Henner’s possession until his death. When he died childless his estate passed to his niece Eugénie and his nephew Jules. Jules Henner then donated it to the Musée des Beaux-Arts de la Ville de Paris in 1905.

The work has featured in a number of exhibitions, including:

- 2017-18: Acclamée et brocardée. La peinture française 1820-1880, Kunsthaus Zürich
- 2008-9: Salon parisien au XIXe siècle, Gemeentemuseum Den Haag
- 1989-90: Jean-Jacques Henner, Musée des Beaux-Arts de Mulhouse
- 1986: La justice et la vengeance divine poursuivant le crime, Réunion des Musées Nationaux

== Critical opinion ==
Hippolyte Devillers considered the work a masterpiece, praising the way the dim light picks out the miraculous softness of Bara’s skin, that makes him almost seem still alive and is reminiscent of Henner’s work exhibited at the previous year’s Salon, La Femme qui lit/La Liseuse.

Ludovic Baschet was impressed by the way the boy’s flesh is warmed by the amber tones of which Henner had the secret mastery. Henry Houssaye thought that “there is more grace in the body of this adolescent than in any Venus, more life in this corpse than in any Bacchante, more poetry in this young boy than in any sunset.” He considered the painting to be the finest work in the Salon of 1882, deserving a gold medal for masterly execution (the work did not in fact win a medal).

In her review for the Academy, Emilia Dilke (writing as EFS Pattison) remarked “‘Barra’ [is] a work which, by its solidity and the beautiful quality of its flesh painting, recalls the memorable ‘Dead Christ’ exhibited by M. Henner, I think, in 1876.” To Henry Houssaye the position of the body recalled that of Abel in Prud'hon’s fr:La Justice et la Vengeance divine poursuivant le Crime. Jules Claretie said that Henner’s work “gives a feeling of heroism much more profound than the Baras dressed as hussars, little boys dressed as warriors, shown to us, at the Salon, with their sabers and their cadenettes.

One critic, commenting on the unusual choice of subject for Henner, speculated that he had merely sketched the figure of a sleeping model a while previously, and then decided later to add the drumstick and give the work artificial gravitas by naming it after the Republican hero. Jean Meriem agreed, speculating that the work had been completed some time before 1882 and then simply given the title Barra to take advantage of the contemporary interest in the subject. Without so much as a strip of fabric near his supine body, he argued, there is hardly a detail in the painting - except the drum - that gives any kind of appropriate historical setting or justifies the title. This view is however contradicted by François Thiébault-Sisson, who related how Henner had been considering Bara as a subject for a long time, and had been sketching plans for it in between other projects he was working on. Indeed in most of these sketches Bara was depicted clothed, but Henner eventually painted him naked, causing many of the public to doubt whether the title of the work was appropriate.

Technically, Jean Meriem considered the execution to be faulty, with a poorly-drawn left leg and an apparently dislocated knee. He also felt that while the depiction of the body emphasised the subject’s youth, it gave no indication of the toughening of the frame that would be associated with war.
