= Jean-Joseph Weerts =

French painter (1846-1927)

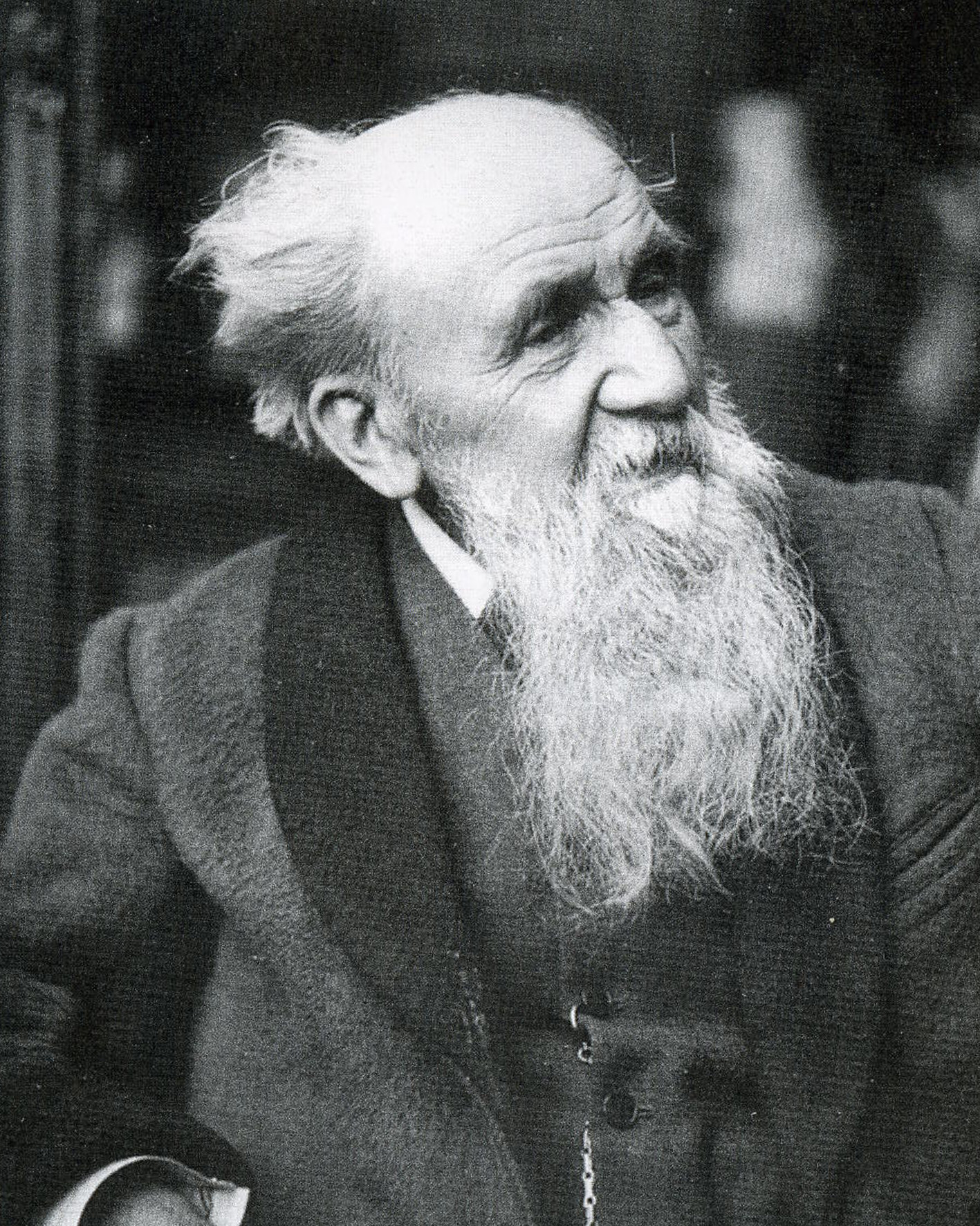
Photograph of Weerts from Roubaix de A à Z by Philippe Waret and Jean-Pierre Popelier

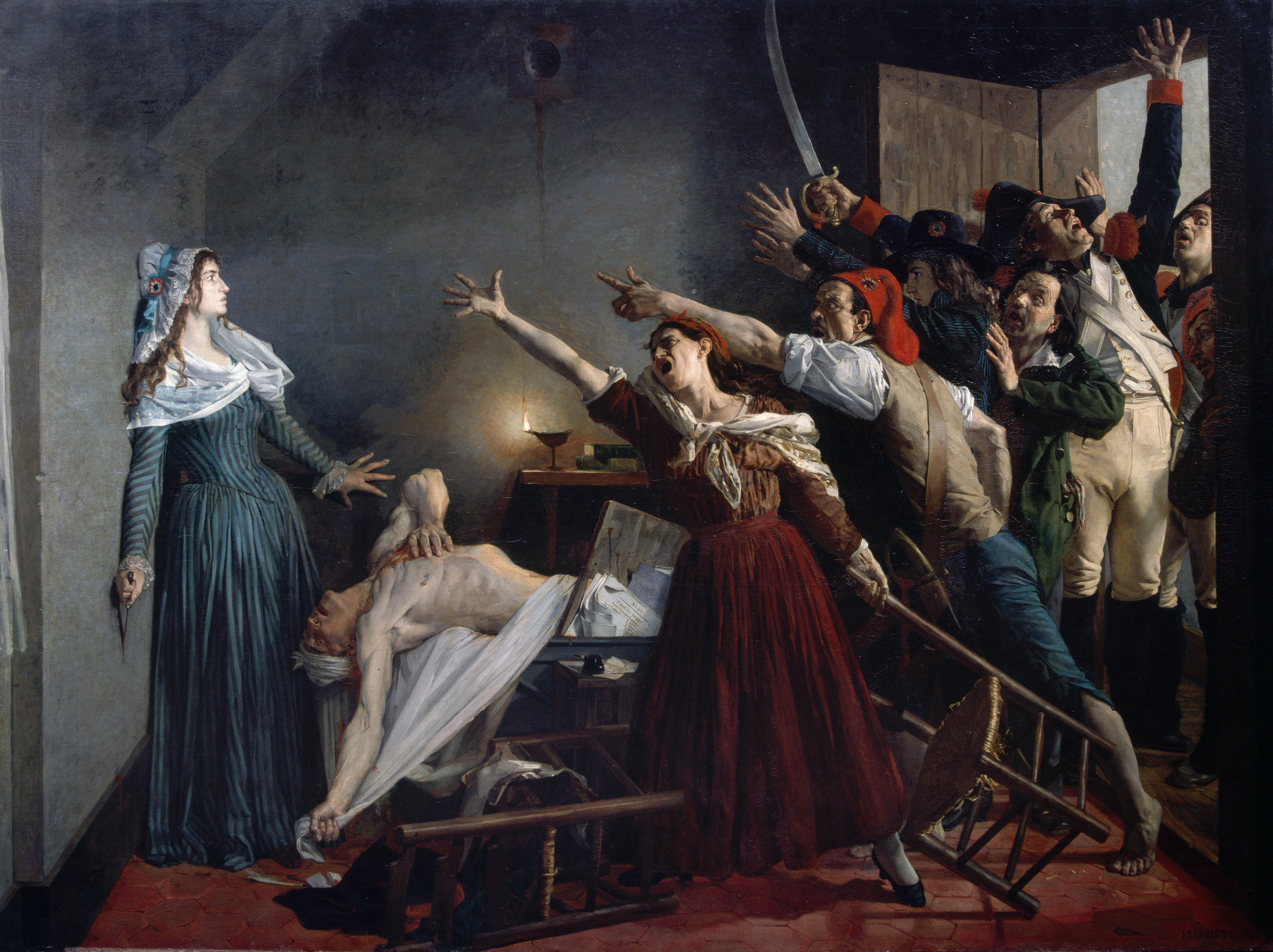
The Assassination of Marat (1880)

Jean-Joseph Weerts (1 May 1846 – 28 September 1927) was a French painter of Belgian origin who worked in the Academic style.

== Biography ==
His father was a mechanical engineer who gave him his first introduction to drawing. Later, in 1858, he attended the Académie des Beaux-arts de Roubaix. With a pension (stipend) from Roubaix, he enrolled at the École des Beaux-arts in 1867, working in the studios of Alexandre Cabanel.

He produced nearly 700 works, including portraits and paintings on historical and religious themes. The Death of Bara earned him the Légion d'honneur in 1884. He also decorated a number of public buildings throughout France and participated in several official projects for the Third Republic, including the Hôtel de Ville, the Sorbonne and the Hôtel des Monnaies. He also worked at the Limoges City Hall and the College of Medicine in Lyon.

He was buried at Père-Lachaise, and a street in Roubaix was named after him. A monument in his honor was created by the sculptor Alexandre Descatoire and may be seen in Roubaix's Parc Barbieux.

== See also ==
- Pour l'Humanité, pour la Patrie
- The Death of Bara
