= François Lays =

French opera singer (1758–1831)

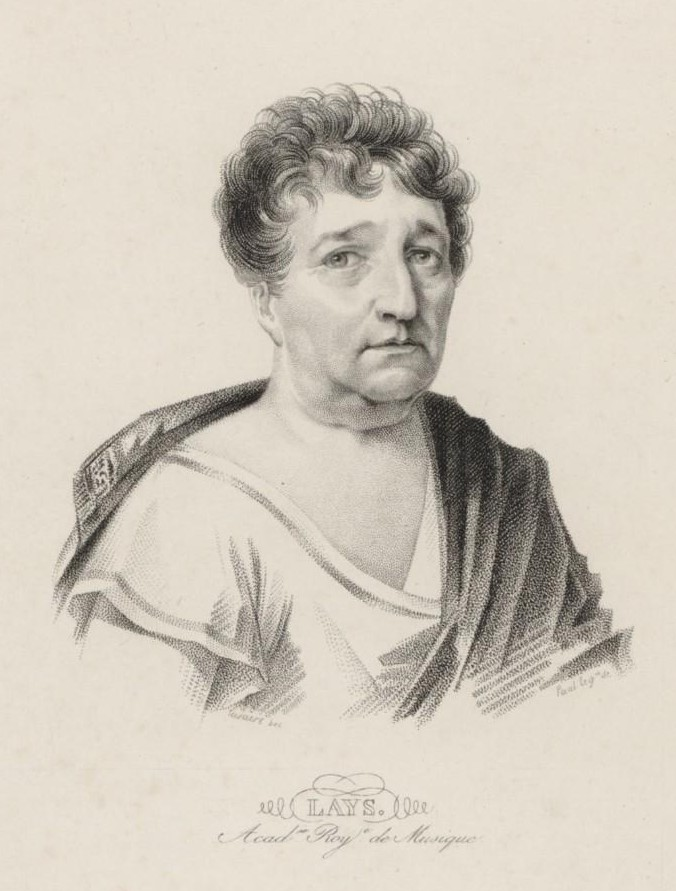
François Lays

François Lay, better known under the stage name Lays (14 February 1758 – 30 March 1831), was a French baritone and tenor opera singer. Originally destined for a career in the church, Lays was recruited by the Paris Opéra in 1779. He soon became a leading member of the company, in spite of quarrels with the management. Lays enthusiastically welcomed the French Revolution and became involved in politics with the encouragement of his friend Bertrand Barère. Barère's downfall led to Lays being imprisoned briefly, but he soon won back the public and secured the patronage of Napoleon, at whose coronation and second wedding he sang. This association with the Emperor caused him trouble when the Bourbon monarchy was restored and Lays's final years were darkened by disputes over his pension, mounting debts, the death of his only son and his wife's illness. After a career spanning more than four decades, he died in poverty.

Lays was famous for the beauty of his voice. One of the Opéra's most popular artistes, he enjoyed his greatest success singing comic roles, such as Anacreon in Grétry's Anacréon chez Polycrate (1797) and the bailiff in Lebrun's Le rossignol (1816).

== Biography ==
=== Youth and education ===
Lays was born in the village of La Barthe-de-Neste in the region of Bigorre in what was then Gascony. His family intended him for a career in the Church at the Sanctuary of Notre-Dame-de-Garaison (Monléon-Magnoac), where he stayed until he was 17, receiving a solid musical education as a chorister and developing a remarkable baritenor voice. He was transferred to Auch for a short while to study philosophy and work as a teacher before returning to Garaison to study theology. In 1778, the canons of the convent gave Lays a grant to study for a doctorate in theology in Toulouse. Lays was now determined to abandon a career in the Church and became increasingly active as a singer, joining the cathedral choir and accepting invitations to perform at local salons. In Toulouse, Lays formed a lifelong friendship with the young lawyer Bertrand Barère, the future French Revolutionary politician and member of the Committee of Public Safety. Barère introduced Lays to the city's Enlightenment circles. On Easter Sunday 1779, Lays was singing the liturgy in the cathedral when he was heard by the Intendant Royal of Languedoc. Following the recruitment practice then used by Académie Royale de Musique (the Paris Opéra), the Intendant decided to issue Lays with a royal ordinance (equivalent to a lettre de cachet) obliging him to travel to Paris for an audition.

=== Early career ===
Lays was immediately enrolled in the company as one of the lower male voices (known in France at the time as basse-tailles) and began a rapid ascent up the Opéra career ladder. He was first introduced to the Parisian public on 10 October 1779, singing the aria "Sous les lois de l'hymen" by Pierre Montan Berton to great applause (it had been inserted into the acte de ballet La Provençale by Jean-Joseph Mouret and Pierre-Joseph Candeille). He made his official debut on the 31st of the same month, playing Théophile in a revival of "Théodore", the second entrée from Étienne-Joseph Floquet's L'union de l'amour et des arts. Having stepped in as a substitute in the role of Oreste in Gluck's Iphigénie en Tauride, in 1780 he was given the first new roles of his career: a follower of Morpheus in Piccinni's Atys; the male protagonist in the unsuccessful acte de ballet Laure et Pétrarque by Candeille; and the bailiff in Floquet's Le seigneur bienfaisant, Lays's first big success. Between 1780 and 1791, he was a member of two of the main musical institutions at court, the Concerts de la reine (the Queen's concerts) and the King's Grand Couvert, soon becoming a favourite of the royal couple, and in particular of Marie Antoinette.

His early career at the Opéra was quite turbulent. The institution at the time was seething with discontent: the artistes resented the fact their wages were only a third of those of the actors of the Comédie-Française and the Comédie-Italienne; moreover, their pay was only partly fixed and permanent, the rest being linked to how frequently they appeared on stage and the size of their roles. The rebellious Lays soon became embroiled in a heated confrontation with the management, behaving almost like a modern union agitator, with the support of two singers who had joined the company around the same time, the haute-contre Jean-Joseph Rousseau and the bass Auguste-Athanase Chéron (1760–1829). In June 1781, fire destroyed the second hall of the Palais Royal, the home of the theatre, causing performances to be suspended. This left the singers with only their meagre basic salaries, so the three decided to remedy the situation by accepting engagements elsewhere, even though they were prohibited by law from doing so as salaried artistes of the Académie Royale de Musique. Rousseau alone managed to travel to Brussels surreptitiously and appear at the Théâtre de la Monnaie, then the second most important French-speaking theatre in the world. Lays, however, was arrested on the evening of 20 August 1781, the day before he was due to set off, and spent ten days in prison. He was provisionally released on the 30th because he was indispensable for filling the haute-contre role of Cynire in a revival of Gluck's Echo et Narcisse in the small hall of the Menus-Plaisirs which acted as a substitute for the theatre which had burned down. His enormous popularity with the public, with an encore of the main aria and several curtain-calls, made it practically impossible to send him back to prison, although he was forced to sign a solemn undertaking that he would not leave Paris without the express permission of his superiors.

In 1782, the director of the Opéra, Antoine Dauvergne, was forced to resign his post and the management of the theatre was assumed by the artists acting as a kind of cooperative. The results were so disastrous that the former director had to be recalled in April 1785, although even then his relationship with the trio of rebel singers did not improve very much. In a report to his superiors, Dauvergne described Lays as the black sheep of the group, Rousseau as a "nice young man", if only he had spent less time in the company of Lays, and Chéron as another "nice young man" (with the mind of a twelve-year-old), but scared of the beating Lays and Rousseau had promised him if he betrayed their alliance. In the end, the three had to bow to pressure from the theatre management, although not before being promoted to "Premiers Sujets" (leading artistes), the highest rank in the company hierarchy.

=== Revolutionary era ===
A long-time Freemason and an avid reader of Rousseau, after the outbreak of the French Revolution in 1789 Lays joined the Jacobin Club under the patronage of his old friend Barère. Lays was a passionate believer in the ideals of the Revolution, promoting them among the members of the Opéra company, which had been renamed Théatre des Arts. This was not enough, however, to prevent his arrest in 1792 as a suspected royalist, on the grounds that he had been a leading singer in the Queen's concerts and the Grand Couvert. Only the timely intervention of Barère secured his release after a single night in prison.

It was on Barère's prompting that Lays decided to return to his native Gascony in 1793 as a propagandist for the new Reign of Terror. He was accompanied by his future wife, a young unemployed diamond-polisher named Marie Barbé. In Girondin Bordeaux, his political alignment with the Montagnards provoked such public hostility that he was forced to slip out of the city without even being able to complete his debut performance at the local theatre. Things went much better in his native region, the newly established département of Hautes-Pyrénées, where the Barère clan were politically dominant and where Lays received a hero's welcome. He returned to Paris in mid-July via Toulouse, thus avoiding the hostile Bordeaux. Back in the capital, he delivered a much applauded speech in front of the Commune of Paris.

Lays's direct involvement in political life went little further than this, but, contrary to the claims of the brothers Michaud and Fétis, it was enough to cause him unpleasant repercussions when in 1794 the coup of 9 Thermidor and the downfall of Robespierre radically changed the political situation. Lays was branded a "Terrorist actor" alongside other leading performers with a Revolutionary past, such as Talma, Dugazon and Antoine Trial; and he was forced to try to defend himself by publishing a pamphlet entitled Lays, artiste du théatre des Arts, à ses concitoyens. When a warrant was issued for the arrest of Barère and three of his colleagues from the Committee of Public Safety in March 1795, other associates were implicated in his downfall: Lays was arrested and imprisoned for about four months together with an old friend who had shared his political trajectory – although his role had been far more prominent – the painter Jacques-Louis David.

After his release on 3 July, Lays had to undergo the ritual humiliation the public was imposing on the "Terrorist actors": they were forced to sing the anti-Jacobin hymn "Le Réveil du Peuple", which had just been set to music by a tenor from the Théâtre Feydeau, Pierre Gaveaux, and which seemed destined to replace the Marseillaise as the main Republican anthem. Antoine Trial, a colleague of Gaveaux from the Opéra-Comique who was then in his sixties, had been forced to sing the new hymn kneeling on stage to boos, whistles and jeers from the audience, and had never recovered from the experience, eventually taking his own life with poison. Quéruel writes Lays managed to avoid making his return to the stage in Iphigénie en Tauride, in which his character Oreste sang lines which were a little too suggestive coming from an ex-"Terrorist": "J'ai trahi l'amitié, j'ai trahi la nature/Des plus noirs attentats, j'ai comblé la mesure" ("I have betrayed friendship, betrayed Nature/I have gone to the extreme of blackest deeds"). On the other hand, according to the memoirs of Count Jean-Nicolas Dufort de Cheverny, it was indeed in the role of Oreste that Lays sought to return to the stage. However, the implacable hostility of the audience prevented him from singing a single note and, after an hour of fruitless efforts, he eventually had to be replaced by an understudy. His actual reappearance then took place in a revival of Sacchini's Œdipe à Colone, in which he sang the far less controversial character of King Theseus. Even then, things did not go smoothly: the audience booed and protested throughout the performance, although this time he was not prevented from completing it. At the end, the leading tenor Étienne Lainez returned onto the proscenium to sing, as usual, Le Réveil du Peuple, but he was shouted down and forced to take refuge in the wings. Lays was rowdily summoned back instead. Lainez accompanied his colleague on stage, hoping they would be allowed to sing together, but he was once more driven off by the furious audience, and Lays had to perform solo. No sooner had he managed to get through a couple of verses, however, than he too was driven off by booing, because the audience thought he was unworthy of the words he was singing. The unfortunate Lainez had to retake the stage for a third time to finish the performance. By the end of September, nevertheless, enthusiasm for such post-Revolutionary reprisals had abated and Lays was able to make a triumphant return as the Genius of Fire in Salieri's Tarare, his debut in the role.

=== The Directory and Napoleonic era ===
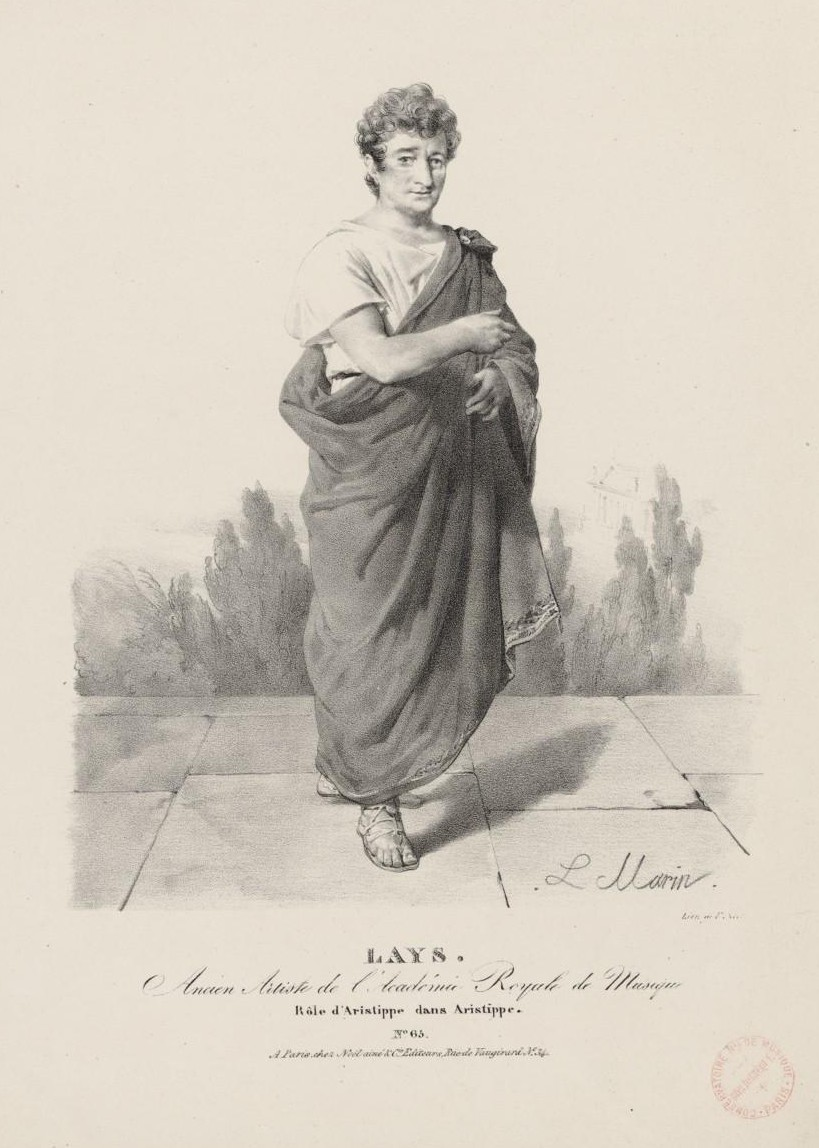
Lays, in the role of Aristippe in the opera Aristippe by Rodolphe Kreutzer

Over the course of 15 years Lays had built a remarkable reputation as a singer. He had been a star at the court of the Ancien Régime, before performing at the opening of the Estates General at Versailles in 1789. Later he had sung several works by Gossec at some of the grandest ceremonies of the French Revolution: he had performed in the Te Deum at the Fête de la Fédération on 14 July 1790; he had sung the funeral hymns when Mirabeau's and Voltaire's mortal remains were transferred to the newly established Panthéon in 1791; and he had sung the Hymne à l'Être-suprême at the Festival of the Supreme Being in June 1794. So it was unsurprising that his career continued to thrive in the new political climate under the government of the Directory. Lays was protected by the strong man of the new regime, Paul Barras, and became friends with his mistress, Josephine de Beauharnais, as well as the man who would become her husband, General Napoleon Bonaparte. With such patrons his position over the next two decades was secure.

In late 1795, Lays was named Professor of Singing at the newly opened Paris Conservatoire. Four years later he resigned to avoid being involved in the quarrel then raging between the managements of the Conservatoire and the Opéra. Quéruel credits Lays with teaching two future stars of the Opéra: Madame Chéron and Mademoiselle Armand. The latter is a possibility; the former had begun her career in 1784 under the name Mademoiselle Dozon, and is thus unlikely to have attended the Conservatoire more than a decade later. Lays did play a part in promoting her early career: he had auditioned her when she was a young unknown in 1782 and had facilitated her studies, entrusting her to the best singing teachers available.

In January 1797, Lays enjoyed one of the biggest successes of his career when he sang the lead role in Grétry's Anacréon chez Polycrate. The takings from this opera (9,354 livres on the first night alone) helped rescue the disastrous finances of the Théâtre de la République et des Arts (as the Opéra had been renamed). If the quality of his voice was universally admired, his lack of physical elegance, his short and stocky build and the southern accent he never completely managed to lose predisposed Lays to comic rather than dramatic roles, particularly middle-aged buffo characters, in which, "singing of love and good wine, he proved to be sublime". Anacreon was one such role. Lays played the character again in 1803 in the opera Cherubini dedicated to the ancient Greek poet. A few decades later, Castil-Blaze – referring to the work by Grétry – commented:

The opera sparkles with charming melodies; the role of Anacreon is the most beautiful, the most complete ever written for Lays, the marvellous sonority of whose voice was deployed so well in the ascending virtuoso passage "Prends, prends emporte mon or, mes trésors pour jamais." The trio "Livre ton cœur à l'espérance" makes a delightful impression." (Castil-Blaze, L' Académie impériale de musique (...) – De 1645 à 1855, Paris, Castil-Blaze, 1855, II, p. 61)

The year 1798 was a turning point in Lays's private life: Marie Barbé, with whom he had been living for several years, gave birth to a daughter and Lays, to legitimise the child, decided to marry his companion, even though it was against his father's wishes. Old Lay was furious that his eldest child, who enjoyed a successful career, was marrying a foreign woman with no property. The couple went on to have four more children, including one son who would unwittingly cause Lays enormous grief.

In the same year, Lays politely refused Napoleon's invitation to join him on his expedition to Egypt. Nevertheless, the pair remained on friendly terms and between 1801 and 1802, Lays – who had often performed in Josephine's salons – became chief singer of the Chapel Napoleon had established at the Tuileries under the directorship of Giovanni Paisiello. As such, three years later, on 2 December 1804, Lays was the lead soloist in the music accompanying Napoleon's coronation as emperor. The ensuing celebrations culminated at the Hôtel de Ville on 16 December with Lays and Chéron singing the cantata Trasibule, specially written for the occasion by Henri-Montan Berton. In 1810, when Napoleon divorced Josephine and entered into a second marriage with the Austrian Archduchess Marie Louise, Lays was the obvious choice to perform at the wedding ceremony. Meanwhile, his stage activity continued unabated, and in 1807 he was also appointed to serve on the Opéra jury in charge of evaluating new works to be staged. Other members of the jury came and went, but Lays remained in office continuously until 1815.

=== Final years ===
At the fall of Napoleon in 1814, Lays was one of the Emperor's most prominent favourites, so when the allied armies entered Paris under the leadership of Tsar Alexander I, he was understandably worried about his own future. On 2 April, Talleyrand ordered the Opéra to mount a performance in honour of the tsar. The opera chosen, Le triomphe de Trajan by Persuis and Lesueur, had originally been given in 1807 to celebrate Napoleon's return to the capital. Not wanting to hurt the French public's feelings, Alexander requested a staging of Spontini's La vestale instead, an opera in which Lays always assumed the role of Cinna. At the end of the performance, the angry audience forced Lays – still dressed in his Roman toga – to return to the stage and recite some popular verses thanking the tsar for restoring the Bourbons. According to the brothers Michaud, Alexander was moved to compassion by the sight of the terrified singer and sent one of his aides-de-camp on stage to reassure him.

The first Restoration was quite mild and the only significant penalty Lays suffered was his dismissal from the former Chapelle Impériale with a resulting loss of income. When Napoleon returned to power for the so-called Hundred Days, Lays was inevitably reinstated in his post and he enthusiastically participated in the Te Deum of thanks. The second Restoration of the Bourbons was more serious for Lays. At the express wish of Louis XVIII he was again expelled – this time for good – from the new Chapelle Royale, but in return, in 1816, he was named professor of declamatory singing at the École royale de Musique et de Déclamation, which had replaced the Conservatoire. The salary was indispensable to Lays because his gout meant he was no longer able to appear at the Opéra as regularly as he had done, leading to a drastic reduction in extra income.

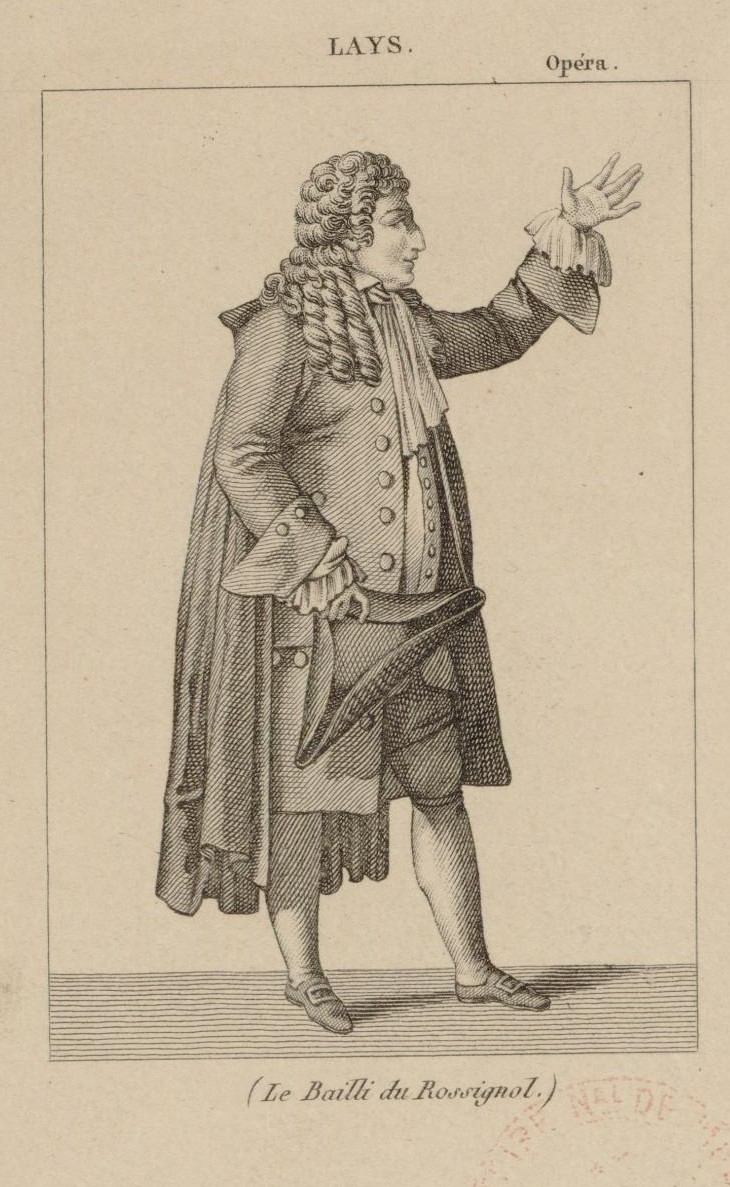
Lays in the role of the bailiff in Le rossignol by Louis-Sébastien Lebrun

In 1816, Lays had the satisfaction of enjoying one final triumph in the comic opera Le rossignol by Louis-Sébastien Lebrun (1764–1829), set in the foothills of his native Pyrenees. Lays took one of his favourite stock parts, "a bailiff in his fifties, a lover of good food and beautiful young women, naive and credulous, convinced of his own powers of seduction. The audience, at first amused and then enthralled, gave him a standing ovation which cheered his heart." However, things subsequently took a turn for the worse. In 1817, the restored Intendant of the Menus-Plaisirs du Roi, Papillon de la Ferté abolished all additional emoluments granted by Napoleon, leaving the singer to survive on his meagre salary from the school of music and the minimum pay from the Opéra, at the very time when his son, stricken with tuberculosis, required expensive medical treatment and his four daughters needed money for their dowries. Lays turned to Luigi Cherubini. Lays had repeatedly supported Cherubini when Napoleon had shown signs of dislike for the composer. Cherubini had now become one of the leading figures in the musical establishment under the Restoration. He immediately intervened on Lays's behalf, but all he could obtain from Ferté was the advice that the singer should go on a tour of the provinces as a way of supplementing his income. Having obtained leave of absence, Lays appeared in Nancy (where performances were interrupted by the death of the leading soprano) and Strasbourg, where Lays himself was obliged to interrupt them with disastrous effects on his finances: he had been unexpectedly summoned back to Paris on the pretext he was urgently needed for rehearsals of a new opera, Les jeux floraux; in reality, the rehearsals only took place two months later. Lays then applied to the royal administration, insisting he should be granted some of the potential economic benefits provided by law, but, after the new opera's premiere, his demands received a blanket rejection. According to Quéruel, when he protested stridently about this decision, he was forced into unpaid leave from his theatrical activities in late 1818. He subsequently spent about two years of hardship, during which his need to provide a dowry for his eldest daughter Marie-Cécile forced him further into debt.

Quéruel relates that Lays was finally reinstated only on 9 January 1821, but this assertion cannot be accurate because the singer's name often appeared on the theatre bills in the meantime, for example the whole period between July 1819 and June 1820. Whatever the case, in response to his renewed demands for economic support, the administration granted him further leave to perform privately outside Paris. Lays went on a tour of the Low Countries and also put on several performances of Anacréon chez Polycrate at the same Brussels Théâtre de la Monnaie to which he had tried to escape forty years earlier. The reviews from the local newspaper, the "Mercure belge", reported by Quéruel tell of a real triumph. On his return to Paris, however, he was greeted with disastrous news. It was now obvious that the singer had been targeted in high places: the Minister of the Maison du Roi, General Jacques Alexandre Law de Lauriston, who was ultimately in charge of the theatre, had discovered he had not previously authorised the leave of absence granted to Lays and, regarding it as null and void, intended to sue him for damages for missing performances at the Opéra. The confrontation lasted for more than a year until, in 1823, the moment came for Lays to leave the Opéra after almost 45 years of outstanding service. The benefit concert, to which artistes were entitled on their retirement, took place on 1 May. The performance ended with Le rossignol, during which almost all the stars who did not have roles in the opera paid homage to their respected and well-liked colleague by appearing on stage in the chorus. The first part of the concert saw the company of the Théâtre-Français transfer to the Opéra for a revival of Racine's tragedy Athalie, performed with incidental music and choruses by Gossec. The leading roles were taken by three star actors: Lays's old friend and political ally, Talma; the great Racine specialist Mademoiselle Duchesnois; and Pierre Lafon. The "premiers sujets" of the Opéra sang as simple "coryphées" in the chorus. The takings were considerable, amounting to the remarkable sum of 14,000 francs. According to Quéruel, however, shortly afterwards a peremptory letter from the administration dated 1 June 1823 informed Lays of its intention to use the takings from the performance to make good the debts it claimed Lays owed it. It is not entirely clear, from Quéruel's account, how the issue was finally resolved. Whatever the case, the financial position of the singer and his family remained extremely precarious. He still kept his teaching post at the École royale de musique et de déclamation, but the salary and pension were clearly not enough for him to cope with his debts and live a comfortable life, and thus, in spite of his ailing health and his now worn-out voice, he was forced to accept engagements, however humiliating, from provincial companies, just to make ends meet. According to Quéruel, posters of the time show he worked as an understudy in a company in Brest, a baritone in the choir of the Dunkirk Opera, a reserve baritone in Lille, a bass soloist in Valenciennes, and once more as a simple understudy at the Metz opera house.

In late 1825, however, Lays again took to the Opéra stage in a benefit concert for the great singer Giuditta Pasta. The show, held on 8 October, was a double bill: the final Paris performance of Meyerbeer's Il crociato in Egitto followed by another revival of Le rossignol. Meyerbeer's opera had previously been staged at the Théâtre italien and was performed by an almost entirely Italian company led by Pasta and Domenico Donzelli. In Le rossignol, Lays once more played his favourite character of the bailiff, while the principal female role of Philis was taken by Laure Cinti-Damoreau, a pupil of Rossini, soon to become the leading lady in the composer's French operas.

New political developments did not bode well for Lays. Charles X, who had come to the throne in 1824, named the ultra-royalist Sosthènes I de La Rochefoucauld as Director General of the Fine Arts. La Rochefoucauld had an aversion to Lays both as an inveterate supporter of the Revolution, and, in particular, for the ironic remarks the singer had made about his morality campaign, which included lengthening ballerinas' skirts and providing ancient statues with fig leaves. In 1826, La Rochefoucauld had the opportunity to demonstrate his dislike when Lays, realising that life in Paris was beyond his financial means, decided to leave his post as professor and retire to the provinces to be near his married eldest daughter. According to Quéruel. Lays, probably wanting to end his career of more than 40 years on a high note, sent the minister a petition signed by almost all the stars of the Opéra and backed by Cherubini, asking for another benefit concert, in addition to the one three years earlier, this time in aid of his son who was working as a saute-ruisseau' at a notary's and whose legal studies Lays could not afford to maintain. Inevitably the request fell on deaf ears. Lays also asked for his pension to be recalculated, bearing in mind his years teaching at the conservatory. But this led to disputes to which the correspondence between Cherubini and La Rochefoucauld bears explicit testimony. In October, the former wrote:

I have the honour to inform you that Monsieur Lays has retired and is asking for his pension. There is no doubt that he has a right to such recompense. There is no need to tell you of the talent of this famous artist, whose career has been long and fruitful. His reputation, which has endured for half a century, makes all such talk superfluous. In the interests of the professor, I must add that it is the meagreness of his fortune more than his age which has forced him to ask for his pension. No longer able to live in the capital in the manner to which he is accustomed, his intention is to retire to somewhere in the provinces where he and his family will be able to live more comfortably.

A week later, having received no reply, Cherubini tried again:

Permit me to bring to your attention the services he has rendered to musical and dramatic art, and the regrettable situation in which he finds himself after such long services as well as having to provide for a large family.

No response having come from the administration, Quéruel claims that Cherubini made the courageous decision to use his discretionary powers and take personal responsibility for authorising a special performance whose takings would be divided equally between the Académie and Lays. Even if it is unclear what right the director of the École royale de musique et de déclamation had to make such a decision, the performance did in fact take place at the Opéra on 20 November 1826. The programme consisted of Boieldieu's opéra comique Le calife de Bagdad; the second act of Anacréon chez Polycrate, in which Lays played his most famous role for the last time; and the four-act pantomime-ballet Mars et Vénus, ou Les filets de Vulcain with music by Jean Schneitzhöffer. However, the evening's takings of between 6,000 and 7,000 francs were markedly inferior to those Lays's presence on stage would once have guaranteed.

La Rochefoucauld's reply on the issue of the pension was delayed until January 1827, when he stated that Lays was not entitled to any pension increase with regard to his previous years of teaching, having already received the maximum provided for as a result of his theatrical activity, and having furthermore shared half the takings from an extra benefit performance. Meanwhile, Lays, his wife and unmarried daughters, had retired to Ingrandes in the Loire valley, where they joined his married daughter Marie-Cécile. Here he had already witnessed the death of his son Bertrand from consumption and was soon to see his wife stricken with paralysis. In his final years Lays spent his time singing hymns in local churches. He died aged 73 in 1831, leaving his wife and children the paltry sum of 1056 francs.

== Artistic characteristics ==
As mentioned above, Lays's voice was classified as basse-taille in the Opéra company, a voice type which was initially roughly equivalent to the modern bass-baritone, but by the latter half of the 18th century had come to designate all low male voices. According to the brothers Michaud, however, Lays "was not strictly a basse-taille, although he sometimes forced his voice downwards excessively to reach the lower notes, and he was listed among the company's leading basse-tailles", neither was he, contrary to some erroneous contemporary descriptions, a tenor: he was in fact "an admirable baritone or concordant, low, pure, sonorous and flexible, whose range and volume were amazing". Irish tenor Michael Kelly, who happened to hear him in the 1780s, wrote that "Monsieur Laisse" possessed "a fine baritone voice, with much taste and expression". The majority of modern authors share these opinions. According to Elizabeth Forbes, for instance, he possessed a "voice, baritonal in quality, but which extended into the tenor range". In fact, his roles were mostly notated in the bass clef, but there are also cases where the tenor clef was preferred, such as the title role of Anacréon (1803) by Cherubini, or the role of Cinna in La Vestale (1807) by Spontini.

While there seems to have been no doubt about the great beauty of Lays's voice, which he was able to preserve throughout his career, Fétis criticised his skill in managing it:

In spite of the long-lasting enthusiasm he aroused among the habitués of the Opéra, Lays was not a great singer: one might even say he knew nothing about the fundamentals of the art of singing. His vocalisation was clumsy; he had not learned how to equalise the registers of his voice, and when he changed from chest voice to mixed voice it was by a sudden leap from a mighty organ tone to a sort of flute-like voice, which had a ridiculous rather than pleasant effect. Nonetheless, he used to show off this effect, which would make the aficionados of the time swoon with pleasure. Most of his ornamentation was old-fashioned and tasteless; in spite of these faults, the beauty of his voice made almost everyone who heard him into an admirer, and it was scarcely possible for an opera to succeed unless Lays had a role in it.

— François-Joseph Fétis, Biographie universelle des musiciens et Bibliographie générale de la musique (second edition), Paris, Didot, 1867, V, p. 236

Spire Pitou draws readers' attention to this last point in his work on the Paris Opéra. Pitou was evidently unaware of Lays's attempted flight to Brussels in 1781 and the troubles of his final years, but his comments appear worthy of note nevertheless:

The most impressive aspect of Lays's professional life was not in the quality of his voice, but in the number of times that he used it. He created 68 new characters at the Opéra between 1780 and 1818. It would be interesting to determine how many records he broke in the course of performing this single feat alone. How many singers have had a longer tenure at the Opéra? Has any artist created more roles at the Opéra? What singers besides Lays have learned five new parts in a year? He performed before the days of planes and fast trains, of course, but even making allowances for this lack of temptation to interrupt his activities in Paris to visit foreign opera houses for large fees, modern critics must credit Lays with a singleness of purpose that merits recognition.

— Spire Pitou, The Paris Opéra. An Encyclopedia of Operas, Ballets, Composers, and Performers – Rococo and Romantic, 1715–1815, Westport/London, Greenwood Press, 1985, p. 329

The number of 68 characters listed by Pitou is incomplete. In fact, the roles Lays created amount to at least 74 (cf next section). Moreover, this obviously does not include the roles Lays did not create directly (including those already mentioned, such as Thésée in Sacchini's Œdipe à Colone, Oreste in Iphigénie en Tauride and Cynire in Echo et Narcisse, both by Gluck, as well as Patrocle in the same composer's Iphigénie en Aulide and Figaro in Le Mariage de Figaro by Mozart). Lays's contribution to the Opéra repertoire, which lasted over forty years, was astonishing, and the long duration of the singer's career and the good vocal form he maintained to the last suggest that Fétis's adverse judgement on his technical skills should be accepted only with caution.

== Roles created ==
The following table contains a list of the roles created by François Lays in the course of his long career. The information is mostly taken from Spire Pitou in his book on the Paris Opéra cited in the bibliography.

Character	Opera	Composer	Year
Lead roles
Pétrarque	Laure et Pétrarque	Pierre-Joseph Candeille	1780
Thésée	Ariane dans l'isle de Naxos	Jean-Frédéric Edelmann	1783
Panurge	Panurge dans l'île des lanternes	André Grétry	1785
Jason	La toison d'or	Johann Christoph Vogel	1786
Alcindor	Alcindor	Nicolas Dezède	1787
Pollux	Castor et Pollux	Pierre-Joseph Candeille	1791
Anacréon	Anacréon chez Polycrate	André Grétry	1797
Praxitèle	Praxitèle	Jeanne-Hippolyte Devismes	1800
Mars	Le casque et les colombes	André Gretry	1801
Delphis	Delphis et Mopsa	André Grétry	1803
Pluton	Proserpine	Giovanni Paisiello	1803
Anacréon	Anacréon	Luigi Cherubini	1803
Aristippe	Aristippe	Rodolphe Kreutzer	1808
Sophocle	Sophocle	Vincenzo Fiocchi	1811
Pélage	Pélage	Gaspare Spontini	1814
Roger	Roger de Sicile	Henri-Montan Berton	1817
Other roles
A follower of Morpheus	Atys	Niccolò Piccinni	1780
Proténor	Persée	François-André Danican Philidor	1780
Le Bailli	Le seigneur bienfaisant	Étienne-Joseph Floquet	1780
A Scythian	Iphigénie en Tauride	Niccolò Piccinni	1781
Florival	L'inconnue persécutée	Pasquale Anfossi e Jean-Baptiste Rochefort (1746–1819)	1781
Bastien/A gipsy	Colinette à la cour	André Grétry	1782
Égiste	Électre	Jean-Baptiste Lemoyne	1782
Myrtile	L'embarras des richesses	André Grétry	1782
Hidraot	Renaud	Antonio Sacchini	1783
Gandartès	Alexandre aux Indes	Nicolas-Jean Lefroid de Méreaux	1783
Husca	La caravane du Caire	André Grétry	1784
The king	Chimène	Antonio Sacchini	1784
Anténor	Dardanus	Antonio Sacchini	1784
Germond	Rosine	François-Joseph Gossec	1786
Young Horace	Les Horaces	Antonio Salieri	1786
Thaddée	Le Roi Théodore à Venise	Giovanni Paisiello	1787
Vellinus	Arvire et Évélina	Antonio Sacchini and Jean-Baptiste Rey	1788
Astor	Démophoon	Luigi Cherubini	1788
Aristophane	Aspasie	André Grétry	1789
Baron de la Dardinière	Les prétendus	Jean-Baptiste Lemoyne	1789
Narbal	Démophon	Johann Christoph Vogel	1789
Mathurin	Les pommiers et le moulin	Jean-Baptiste Lemoyne	1790
Mozès	Louis IX en Égypte	Jean-Baptiste Lemoyne	1790
Le Sauvage	Le portrait	Stanislas Champein	1790
Atabila	Cora	Étienne Nicolas Méhul	1791
Lourdis	Corisandre	Honoré Langlé	1791
Lafleur	L ' Heureux stratagème	Louis Emmanuel Jadin)	1791
Thomas	Le triomphe de la république	François-Joseph Gossec	1793
Démosthènes	Toute la Grèce, ou ce qui peut la liberté	Jean-Baptiste Lemoyne	1794
Valerius Publicola	Horatius Coclès	Étienne Nicolas Méhul	1794
A criminal	Toulon soumis	Jean-Baptiste Rochefort	1794
L'ordonnateur chantant	La réunion du 10 août	Bernardo Porta	1794
Le curé	La rosière républicaine	André Gretry	1794
Un commissaire de la majorité des sections	La journée du 10 août 1792	Rodolphe Kreutzer	1795
Flaminius	Adrien	Étienne Nicolas Méhul	1799
Young Horace	Les Horaces	Bernardo Porta	1800
Chariclès	Flaminius à Corinthe	Rodolphe Kreutzer and Nicolas Isouard	1801
Bochoris	Les mystères d'Isis	pastiche	1801
Moctar	Tamerlan	Peter von Winter	1802
David	Saül	pastiche	1803
Morat	Mahomet II	Louis Emmanuel Jadin	1803
Rustan	Le pavillon du calife	Nicolas Dalayrac	1804
Hidala	Ossian, ou Les bardes	Jean-François Lesueur	1804
Éliézar	Nephtali, ou les Ammonites	Felice Blangini	1806
Licinius	Le triomphe de Trajan	Louis-Luc Loiseau de Persuis and Jean-François Lesueur	1807
Cinna	La vestale	Gaspare Spontini	1807
Seth	La mort d'Adam	Jean-François Lesueur	1809
Telasco	Fernand Cortez	Gaspare Spontini	1809
Roger	Jérusalem délivrée	Louis-Luc Loiseau de Persuis	1812
Kan-si	Le laboureur chinois	pastiche	1813
Le chef des vieillards	L'Oriflamme	Étienne Nicolas Méhul, Ferdinando Paër, Henri-Montan Berton and Rodolphe Kreutzer	1814
Socrate	Alcibiade solitaire	Louis Alexandre Piccinni	1814
Le bailli	Le rossignol	Louis-Sébastien Lebrun	1816
Bacchus	Les dieux rivaux, ou Les fêtes de Cythère	Gaspare Spontini, Rodolphe Kreutzer, Louis-Luc Loiseau de Persuis and Henri-Montan Berton	1816
Voldik	Nathalie, ou La famille russe	Antonin Reicha	1816
Colibrados	Zéloïde	Louis-Sébastien Lebrun	1818
Béranger	Les jeux floraux	Pamphile Léopold François Aimon	1818
Le cadi	Aladin, ou la Lampe merveilleuse	Nicolas Isouard, Angelo Maria Benincori and François-Antoine Habeneck	1822

== Sources ==
- Aldino Aldini, Lays, "The Musical World", XXXVI, 33, 14 August 1858, pp. 518–519 (accessible online at Google Books)
- (in French) François-Joseph Fétis, Biographie universelle des musiciens et Bibliographie générale de la musique (Second edition), Paris, Didot, 1867, V, pp. 235–236 (accessible online at Google Books)
- Elizabeth Forbes, Lays [Lay, Lais], François, in Stanley Sadie (ed.), The New Grove Dictionary of Opera, Grove (Oxford University Press), New York, 1997, II, pp. 1112–1113. ISBN 978-0-19-522186-2
- (in French) Adolphe Jullien, 1770–1790. L'Opéra secret au XVIIIe siècle, Paris, Rouveyre, 1880 (accessible online at Internet Archive)
- (in French) Théodore Lajarte, Bibliothèque Musicale du Théatre de l'Opéra. Catalogue Historique, Chronologique, Anecdotique, Paris, Librairie des bibliophiles, 1878, Volume I (accessible online at Internet Archive)
- (in French) Joseph-François Michaud and Louis-Gabriel Michaud, Biographie universelle, ancienne et moderne. Supplément. Suite de l'histoire ..., Paris, Michaud, 1841, LXIX, pp. 486–488 (accessible online at Google Books)
- (in French) Anne Quéruel, François Lay, dit Laÿs: la vie tourmentée d'un Gascon à l'Opéra de Paris, Cahors, La Louve, 2010. ISBN 978-2-916488-37-0
- Spire Pitou, The Paris Opéra. An Encyclopedia of Operas, Ballets, Composers, and Performers – Rococo and Romantic, 1715–1815, Westport/London, Greenwood Press, 1985. ISBN 0-313-24394-8
- This article contains material translated from the equivalent article in the Italian Wikipedia.
