= Arvire et Évélina =

- Tragédie lyrique by Antonio Sacchini
- Antonio Sacchini, engraved portrait
- Librettist: Nicolas-François Guillard
- Language: French
- Based on: William Mason's Caractacus
- Premiere: 29 April 1788; Académie Royale de Musique, Paris

Arvire et Évélina is a French-language opera by Antonio Sacchini, premiered posthumously at the Académie Royale de Musique (the Paris Opéra) on 29 April 1788. It takes the form of a tragédie lyrique in three acts. The libretto, by Nicolas-François Guillard, is based on the dramatic poem Caractacus (1759) by William Mason. It was Sacchini's last opera and the score was left incomplete at the time of the composer's sudden death in October 1786. The missing music was written by Jean-Baptiste Rey.

== Background ==
=== The libretto ===
Arvire et Évélina was Sacchini's fifth French opera and his fourth collaboration with Guillard, his favourite French librettist. The opera is loosely based on an historical event: the resistance of the ancient British king Caractacus to the Roman invasion of Britain in the first century AD. Guillard adapted Arvire et Évélina from Caractacus, a dramatic poem by the English writer William Mason first published in 1759. Caractacus was a bestseller as it exploited the late 18th-century fashion for Celtic history and myth, especially such figures as the Druids. Mason took the name of his Chief Druid, Modred, from his friend Thomas Gray's famous poem The Bard. In 1776, Mason modified the work for a stage performance at the Royal Opera House with incidental music by Thomas Arne.

Guillard freely adapted Mason, changing the story line and many of the names. For example, he had the villain Vellinus repent because he thought French audiences needed a happy ending. He also felt that some of the names would sound harsh to French ears, arguing that the lack of historical accuracy this would entail would not matter so much as the characters were not part of French national history. Thus, Caractacus became "Arvire", Elidurus "Irvin" and Aulus Didius "Messala".

=== Sacchini's death and intrigue surrounding the unfinished score ===
Sacchini had completed some of the score of Arvire by 1786, when he played excerpts to his patron Marie Antoinette, Queen of France. He then became embroiled in intrigues surrounding his attempt to have his previous opera, Œdipe à Colone, restaged. Failure to guarantee future performances of Œdipe was partly blamed for the composer's early death on 7 October 1786 at the age of 56.

The circumstances surrounding Sacchini's death aroused public sympathy and ensured Œdipe was an enormous success when it was performed in Paris in January 1787. The management of the Académie Royale de Musique was equally interested in staging Arvire et Évélina. However, Sacchini had left the score incomplete; almost all the music to the third act was yet to be written. Marie Antoinette was eager to hear the opera and wanted Niccolò Piccinni, Sacchini's fellow Italian composer and former rival, to be given the task of finishing the music. However, the Opéra authorities headed by Antoine Dauvergne preferred the German composer Johann Christoph Vogel. In the event, neither Piccinni nor Vogel were chosen for the job; that honour went to Jean-Baptiste Rey, the batteur de mesure (conductor) of the Académie Royale. Rey's biggest advantage was that he already had the score in his possession. He had suborned Sacchini's lodger Soldato and his servant Lorenzo to obtain the manuscript from Sacchini's house before the police could seal it. He claimed that, on his deathbed, Sacchini had asked him to finish Arvire and produced a signed document as evidence. Although this document was not legally valid, Rey appealed to the Queen and to the xenophobia of some members of the Opéra management, who did not want the task to go to a foreign composer. As the writer on music Melchior Grimm noted ironically, some evidently felt "it was an insult to French musicians for an Italian to be given the responsibility of completing the work of an Italian composer."

== Performance history ==
Arvire et Évélina was first performed on Tuesday 29 April 1788, then not staged again until 2 January 1789. It appeared another 10 times that year and seven times in 1790. Between 1792 and 1799, there were a further 14 performances and another 34 between 1801 and 1809. In 1810, it appeared three more times before being reworked as a two-act piece to accompany other works in 1820 and 1821. It was heard in Paris for the last time in 1827 reaching a considerable total of 95 performances.

The opera was translated into blank verse by Lorenzo Da Ponte as Evelina, or the Triumph of the English (sic) over the Romans and staged at the King's Theatre, London on 10 January 1797. It was a success and ran for a total of 13 performances in 1797 and five in 1798. Da Ponte was praised for the unusual fidelity of his translation and also doubled his profits by publishing the translated libretto on his own printing press and selling copies to the theatre audience.

== Music ==
Rey completed the score by reusing extracts from Sacchini's previous operas. According to Spire Pitou, "three or four passages in Arvire et Évélina became quite popular with the public, for example, "Le voila, ce héro qui combattait pour nous," but it was the aria "O jour affreux" that moved spectators most deeply."

In Giorgio Pestelli's view, Sacchini's music did not attempt to match the early Romanticism of the libretto: "Guillard had very promptly presented Sacchini with a libretto full of early romantic sensibility, embracing the ideas of nature and night ('J'aime la sombre horreur de ce séjour sauvage', the barbarian Arvire sings), the attraction of terror, Ossian, and the Breton forests. But this romanticism did not affect the music, which remains oriented towards the heroic style, with four-square cadences and wide intervals. Only in the choruses of the bards are more interesting protractions noticeable, as in the 'Symphonie douce et majestueuse' in E flat major in Act II, which is tinged with the priestly and masonic solemnity that was to re-echo in Mozart's Die Zauberflőte two years later."

== Roles ==
| Role | Voice type | Premiere cast, 29 April 1788 |
|---|---|---|
| Arvire, King of the Silures | basse-taille (bass-baritone) | Auguste-Athanase (Augustin) Chéron |
| Évélina, Arvire's daughter | soprano | Anne Chéron (née Cameroy) |
| Irvin, a British prince, younger son of Élfrida, Queen of Lenox | tenor | Étienne Lainez |
| Vellinus, Irvin's brother, a British prince, elder son of Élfrida, Queen of Lenox | tenor/baritone | François Lays |
| Messala, a Roman general | basse-taille | Moreau |
| Modred, Chief Druid | baritone | Louis-Claude-Armand Chardin ("Chardiny") |
| A bard | tenor | Martin |
| A Roman | basse-taille | Châteaufort |
Chorus of Druids, Bards, Roman soldiers, British soldiers

== Synopsis ==
Scene: the opera is set on the isle of Mona (Anglesey).

=== Act 1 ===
Scene: moonlight, a grove of oak trees through which a troubled sea can be seen in the distance; rocks on either side

The Roman general Messala and his troops have come to track down the British king Arvire and bring him captive to the Emperor Claudius in Rome. Princes Irvin and Vellinus enter and tell the Romans their search is in vain: in his hiding place on Mona, Arvire can never be caught. Messala replies that Arvire might be taken by cunning and asks the princes to help him: their mother, Queen Élfrida, has already become an ally of Rome. Vellinus agrees to betray Arvire, although Irvin is outraged at his brother's behaviour. The brothers leave as the Druids arrive to perform their sacred ritual. Modred, the Chief Druid, says they must do all they can to protect Arvire from the Romans. Arvire enters, accompanied by his daughter Évélina. Arvire is in despair: after his defeat in battle, the Romans captured his wife. Some of the Druids bring in Irvin and Vellinus, whom they have found lurking nearby. Vellinus says they have come with news from their mother, the Queen of Lenox, who now wants to aid Arvire against the Romans. They must bring Arvire back with them to lead the army. Vellinus even claims that he himself has fought the Romans and freed Arvire's wife. Arvire is delighted and eagerly leaves with Vellinus.

=== Act 2 ===
Scene: A magic grotto intended for the Druids' sacred rites

Modred and the Druids perform a ritual which allows them to see into the future: the vision they have is evil. Évélina rushes in; she suspects that her father is in danger and she distrusts the two princes after she sees Irvin sighing frequently and looking troubled. Modred summons Arvire, Irvin and Vellinus. He tells the princes one of them must swear an oath testifying their good faith on the sacred altar, and he chooses Irvin. Irvin is overcome with doubts about his mother's scheme. He has also fallen in love with Évélina. However, he is reluctant to betray his brother. The ceremony goes ahead, but Évélina interrupts it before Irvin can swear the oath. Modred suspects the truth and urges Irvin to confess everything to Évélina. Irvin and Évélina are left alone and Évélina gradually persuades the prince to admit the plot. Arvire enters with the news that Vellinus has fled to the Romans. A bard announces that the Roman army is invading Mona. At Évélina's prompting, Irvin offers to lead the British defence so Arvire can stay hidden. Arvire and Modred accept and Modred hands Irvin a sword and helmet. The British army marches off.

=== Act 3 ===
Scene: another site, high rocks in the background, a grove with an altar to the left, an underground chamber to the right

Arvire is eager to fight in person, but the Druids dissuade him and hide him in an underground chamber instead. The Roman army, led by Messala and Vellinus, arrives in search of Arvire. Vellinus is worried about his brother; Irvin may have betrayed their plot. Roman soldiers bring news that they are being overwhelmed by a British counterattack led by Irvin. Messala rushes off to lead the defence, leaving Vellinus to search for Arvire. Vellinus is now beginning to regret his part in the plot. He hears noises from underground and tells the Roman soldiers to be ready with an ambush. Évélina enters with the bards and prays at the altar for her father's safety. Suddenly, Vellinus and the Roman soldiers emerge from the trees and capture them. Messala tells Vellinus to keep close guard on Évélina and take her away from Mona. There is a fierce battle between Messala's Romans and Irvin's Britons. Modred announces British victory to Arvire and Irvin enters with Messala in chains. When Messala tells them Évélina has been taken captive, Arvire and Irvin are plunged into despair, but Vellinus arrives with his soldiers; he has had a change of heart and releases Évélina. Arvire magnanimously decides to free the Romans and Messala responds by promising to free Arvire's wife and make an alliance between Rome and Arvire. The opera ends with Arvire promising Évélina's hand in marriage to Irvin.

== Sources ==
- (in French) Original edition of the libretto, available free online at BNF Gallica (on Books Google is also accessible the digitization of a coeval edition of the libretto released in Geneva "Chez Bertrand")
- Benoît Dratwicki, "Sacchini and the Sacchinists at the Heart of the Quarrels", in Antonio Sacchini, Renaud, Madrid, Ediciones Singulares, 2013 (book accompanying the complete recording of Renaud conducted by Christophe Rousset). ISBN 978-84-939-6865-6
- Theodore Fenner, Opera in London: Views of the Press, 1785–1830, Southern Illinois University Press, 1994, ISBN 978-0-8093-1912-1
- Sheila Hodges, Lorenzo Da Ponte: The Life and Times of Mozart's Librettist, University of Wisconsin Press, 2002.
- Giorgio Pestelli The Age of Mozart and Beethoven, Cambridge University Press, 1984. ISBN 0521284791
- Spire Pitou, The Paris Opéra. An Encyclopedia of Operas, Ballets, Composers, and Performers – Rococo and Romantic, 1715–1815, Westport/London, Greenwood Press, 1985. ISBN 0-313-24394-8
- Julian Rushton, "Musicking Caractacus", in Bennett Zon (ed.) Music and Performance Culture in Nineteenth Century Britain: Essays in Honour of Nicholas Temperley, Ashgate Publishing, 2012. ISBN 1409439798
- (in French) Georges Sauvé, Antonio Sacchini 1730–1786 – Un musicien de Marie-Antoinette – Bréviaire biographique, Paris, L'Harmattan, 2006. ISBN 2-296-01994-3
