= La caravane du Caire =

1783 opera or opéra-ballet in three acts by André Grétry

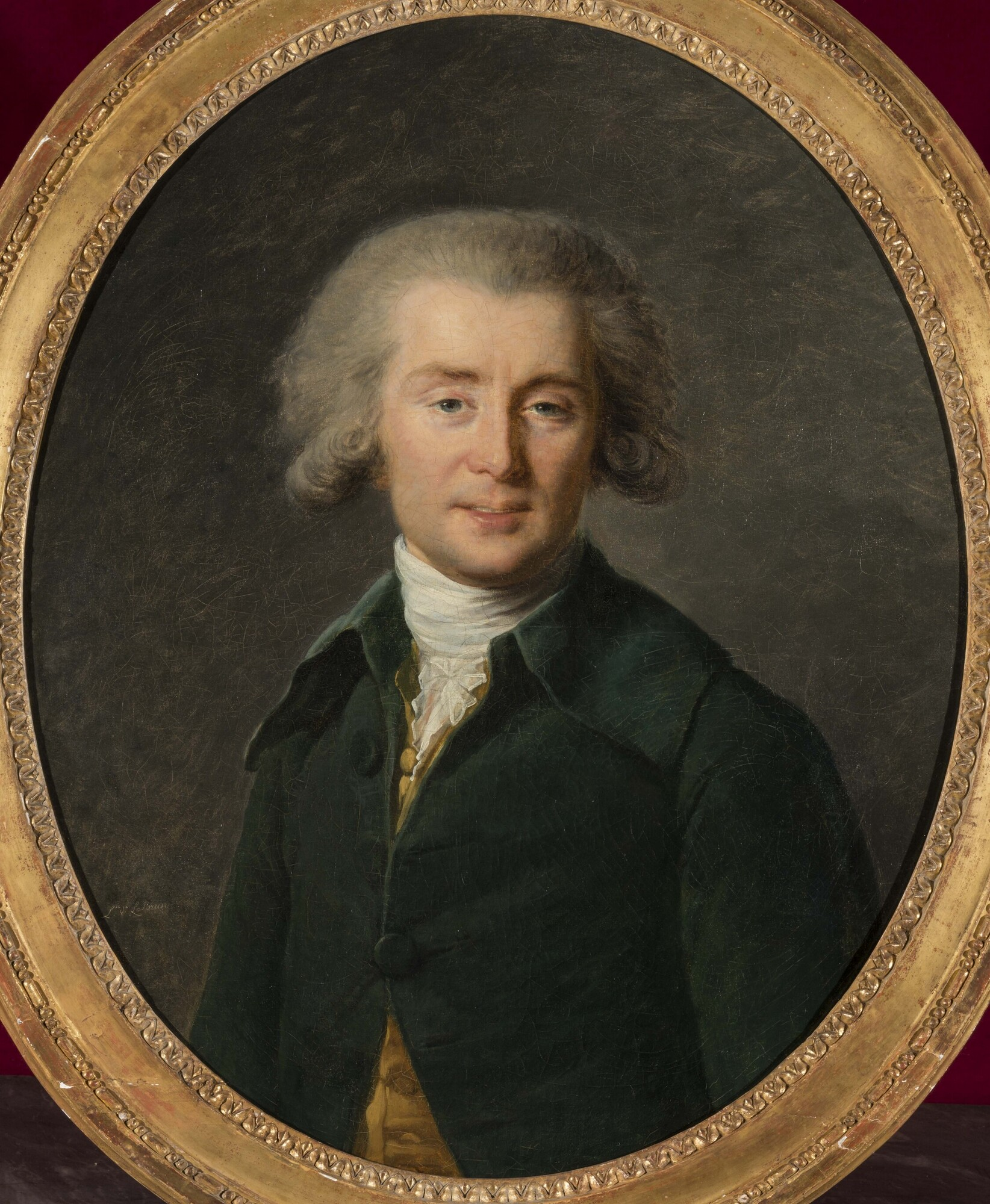
Composer André Grétry

La Caravane du Caire is an opera or opéra-ballet in three acts by André Grétry, set to a libretto by Étienne Morel de Chédeville. Tradition has it that either the libretto was partially written or the idea of it was allegedly suggested by the Count of Provence, who would go down in history as Louis XVIII.

The opera was first performed at the Palace of Fontainebleau on 30 October 1783 and had its public premiere at the Théâtre de la Porte Saint-Martin, the period venue of the Paris Opera, on 15 January 1784. It was the most successful of Grétry's large-scale works that are lighter in tone: it received over 500 performances at the Paris Opera up to 1829, being billed every year between 1785 and 1791, and, except for 1818, between 1806 and 1828, besides enjoying further irregular stagings during the Revolutionary period.

== Roles ==
Role	Voice type	Premiere Cast, 30 October 1783 (Conductor: – )
Osman, the Pasha of Egypt	basse-taille (bass-baritone)	Auguste-Athanase (Augustin) Chéron
Almaïde, the favourite of the Pasha	soprano	Suzanne Joinville
Tamorin, the chief eunuch of the Seraglio	haute-contre	Jean-Joseph Rousseau
Husca, the chief of the caravan and a slave trader	baritone	François Lays
Saint-Phar, a French slave	haute-contre	Étienne Lainez
Zélime, a slave woman	soprano	Marie-Thérèse Maillard
A French slave woman	soprano	Josèphe-Eulalie Audinot
An Italian slave woman	soprano	Mlle Buret
Two Hungarian women	sopranos	Anne-Marie-Jeanne Gavaudan, l'ainée (the elder); Adélaïde Gavaudan, cadette (the younger)
Florestan, a ship's captain	basse-taille (bass-baritone)	Henri Larrivée
Furville, a French officer	baritone	Louis-Claude-Armand Chardin, called "Chardiny"
Osmin, a Seraglio guard	basse-taille (bass-baritone)	M Moreau
Seraglio sultanas	sopranos	Gertrude Girardin, Marie-Anne Thaunat, Mlles Josephine, Rosalie
Chorus: People of different nations, i. e. free voyagers, slaves and Arabs (act I), women and retinue of the Seraglio (acts II–III)

== Synopsis ==
=== Act 1 ===
A caravan is heading to Cairo. Among the travellers are the slave dealer Husca and his slaves Zélime and her husband Saint-Phar. Husca hopes that the beautiful Zélime will fetch a good price on the market. When a band of Arabs attacks the caravan, Saint-Phar offers to help Husca fight them off in return for his freedom. They drive off the Arabs and Husca releases Saint-Phar from slavery but refuses to do the same for Zélime.

=== Act 2 ===
In his palace in Cairo the Pasha is sunk in gloom. Nevertheless, he is keen to celebrate the heroism of Florestan, a Frenchman who saved his treasure ship during a storm. The Pasha's wife Almaïde tries to cheer up her husband with a dance by the women of the harem. Husca and the chief eunuch Tamorin have another idea for improving the Pasha's mood: he should buy himself a new European slave girl or two. They go to the bazaar where they watch a Frenchwoman playing the harp, an Italian singing a virtuoso aria, a German performing a folk song, and dances from Georgians and Indians. But the Pasha is smitten at the sight of Zélime and buys her for his harem. Saint-Phar vows to rescue her.

=== Act 3 ===
While waiting for the celebrations, Florestan laments the loss of his son at sea. Osmin tells Almaïde of a plot by a Frenchman to free Zélime from the harem. Eager to get rid of her new rival, she urges Osmin to give him every help necessary. Florestan thanks the Pasha for his hospitable treatment and prepares to depart. When news comes of the attempted abduction of Zélime, Florestan is outraged to hear that the culprit is a Frenchman. However, it turns out that Saint-Phar is Florestan's lost son. The Pasha relents and frees Saint-Phar and Zélime, allowing the family to be reunited.

== Recordings ==
- La caravane du Caire, Ricercar Academy, Chœur de Chambre de Namur, conducted by Marc Minkowski (2 CDS, Ricercar, 1992; re-released July 2008 together with extracts from Le jugement de Midas conducted by Gustav Leonhardt).
- La caravane du Caire, Chœur de Chambre de Namur, Les Agrémens, conducted by Guy Van Waas (2 CDs, Ricercar, 2014).
- La caravane du Caire, Le Concert Spirituel directed by Hervé Niquet, Ballet de l'Opéra royal, stage director Marshall Pynkoski; cast includes Hélène Guilmette, Jean-Gabriel Saint-Martin, Marie Perbost, Pierre Derhet, Robert Gleadow (CVS Bluray/DVD, 2025)

== Sources ==
=== Period sources ===
- Original libretto: La Caravane du Caire, opéra en trois actes, representé à Fontainebleau devant Leurs Majestés, le 30 Octobre 1783, et pour la premiere fois, sur le Théâtre de l'Academie-Royale de Musique, le Mardi 13 Janvier 1784. De Lormel, Paris 1784 (accessible online at Google Books).
- Period printed score: La Caravane du Caire, opéra ballet en trois actes. Représenté à Fontainebleau devant leurs Majestés le 30 Octobre 1783. Et pour la premiere fois sur le Théâtre de l'Académie Royale de Musique le Lundi 12 Janvier 1784. Huguet, Paris 1784 (accessible online at Gallica).
- La caravane du Caire, opéra ballet, 3 actes, by Andre Ernest Modeste Gretry, French, digitized by BYU on archive.org

=== Modern sources ===
- David Charlton. "La caravane du Caire", in Macy, Laura, ed., Grove Music Online (Retrieved 10 May 2007; grovemusic.com, subscription access).
- Spire Pitou (1985). The Paris Opera: An Encyclopedia of Operas, Ballets, Composers, and Performers. Rococo and Romantic, 1715-1815. Westport, Connecticut: Greenwood Press. ISBN 9780313243943.
