= Tarare (opera) =

Opera by Antonio Salieri

- Tragédie lyrique by Antonio Salieri
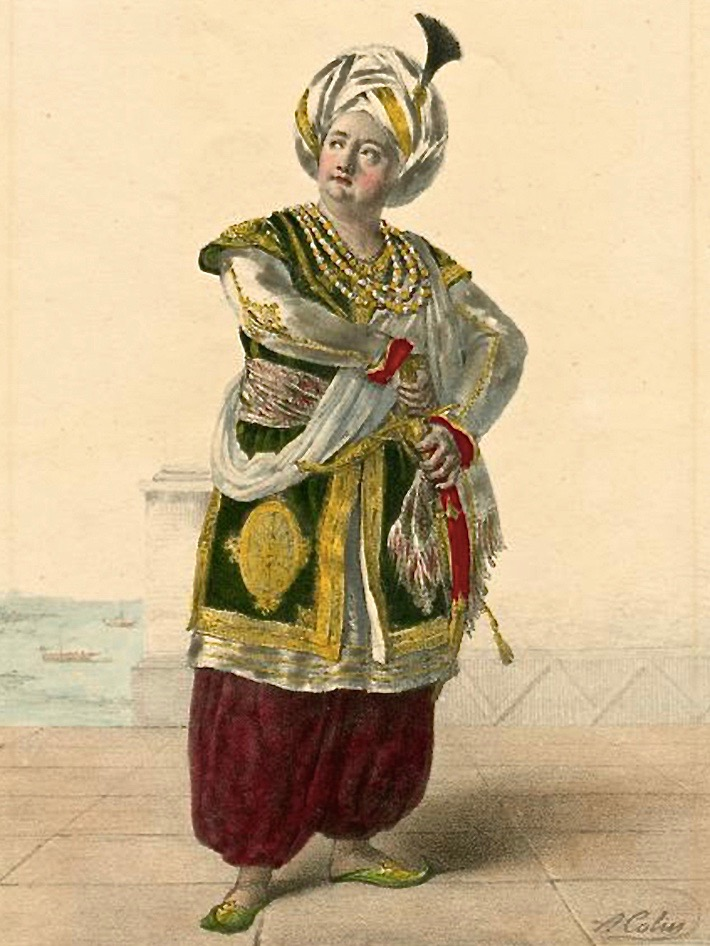
- Adolphe Nourrit in the title role, in Paris 1823
- Librettist: Pierre Beaumarchais
- Language: French
- Premiere: 8 June 1787; Théâtre de la Porte Saint-Martin, Paris

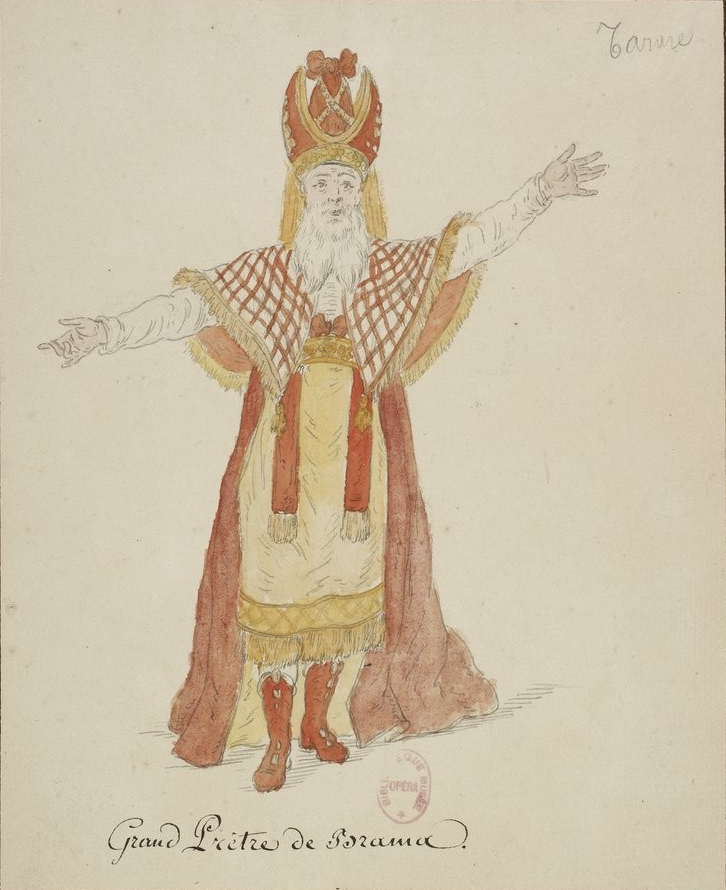
Costume for Arthénée, High Priest of Brahma (1787)

Tarare is an opéra (tragédie lyrique) composed by Antonio Salieri to a French libretto by Pierre Beaumarchais. It was first performed by the Paris Opera at the Théâtre de la Porte Saint-Martin on 8 June 1787. Salieri also reworked the material into an Italian version retitled Axur, re d'Ormus with libretto by Lorenzo Da Ponte, which opened in Vienna in January 1788.

== Roles ==
Roles, voice types, premiere cast
Roles	Voice type	Premiere, 8 June 1787 Conductor: Jean-Baptiste Rey
The genius that presides over the reproduction of creatures, or Nature	soprano	Suzanne Joinville
The genius of fire, which presides over Sun, in love with Nature	basse-taille (bass-baritone)	Louis-Claude-Armand Chardin (stage name, "Chardini")
Atar, King of Ormus, a wild and unrestrained man	basse-taille (bass-baritone)	Auguste-Athanase (Augustin) Chéron
Tarare, a soldier in his service, honoured for his great virtues	taille (baritenor)	Étienne Lainez
Astasie, Tarare's wife, both tender and pious	soprano	Marie Thérèse Davoux (stage name Mademoiselle Maillard)
Arthénée, High Priest of Brahma, a misbeliever devoured by pride and ambition	basse-taille (bass-baritone)	Martin-Joseph Adrien
Altamort, an army general, son of the High Priest, a reckless and fiery youth	basse-taille (bass-baritone)	M Châteaufort
Urson, captain of Atar's guard, a valiant man of great honor	basse-taille (bass-baritone)	M Moreau
Calpigi, chief of the Eunuchs, a European slave and a former singer emerged from the Chapels of Italy, being sensitive and gay	haute-contre	Jean-Joseph Rousseau
Spinette, a European slave woman, Calpigi's wife and a former Neapolitan cantatrice, being meddlesome and coquettish	soprano	Adélaïde Gavaudan, "cadette"
Elamir, a boy of the Augurs, being naive and very devout	boy soprano	Joseph-François-Narcisse Carbonel
A priest of Brahma	basse-taille (bass-baritone)	Pierre-Charles Le Roux "cadet" (the younger)
A slave	basse-taille (bass-baritone)	Pierre-Charles Le Roux "cadet" (the younger)
A eunuch	basse-taille (bass-baritone)	Pierre-Charles Le Roux "cadet" (the younger)
A shepherdess/A shadow (prologue)	soprano	Anne-Marie-Jeanne Gavaudan "l'aînée"
A peasant	basse-taille (bass-baritone)	M Dessaules

== Discography ==
Cyrile Dubois, Tarare and ombre de Tarare, Karine Deshayes, Astasie and ombre de Astasie, Jean-Sébastien Bou, Atar and ombre d'Atar, Judith van Wanroij, La Nature and Spinette, Les Chantres du Centre de Musique Baroque de Versailles, Les Talens Lyriques, conducted by Christophe Rousset. Aparté 2019.
