= Ossian, ou Les bardes =

Opera by Jean-François Le Sueur

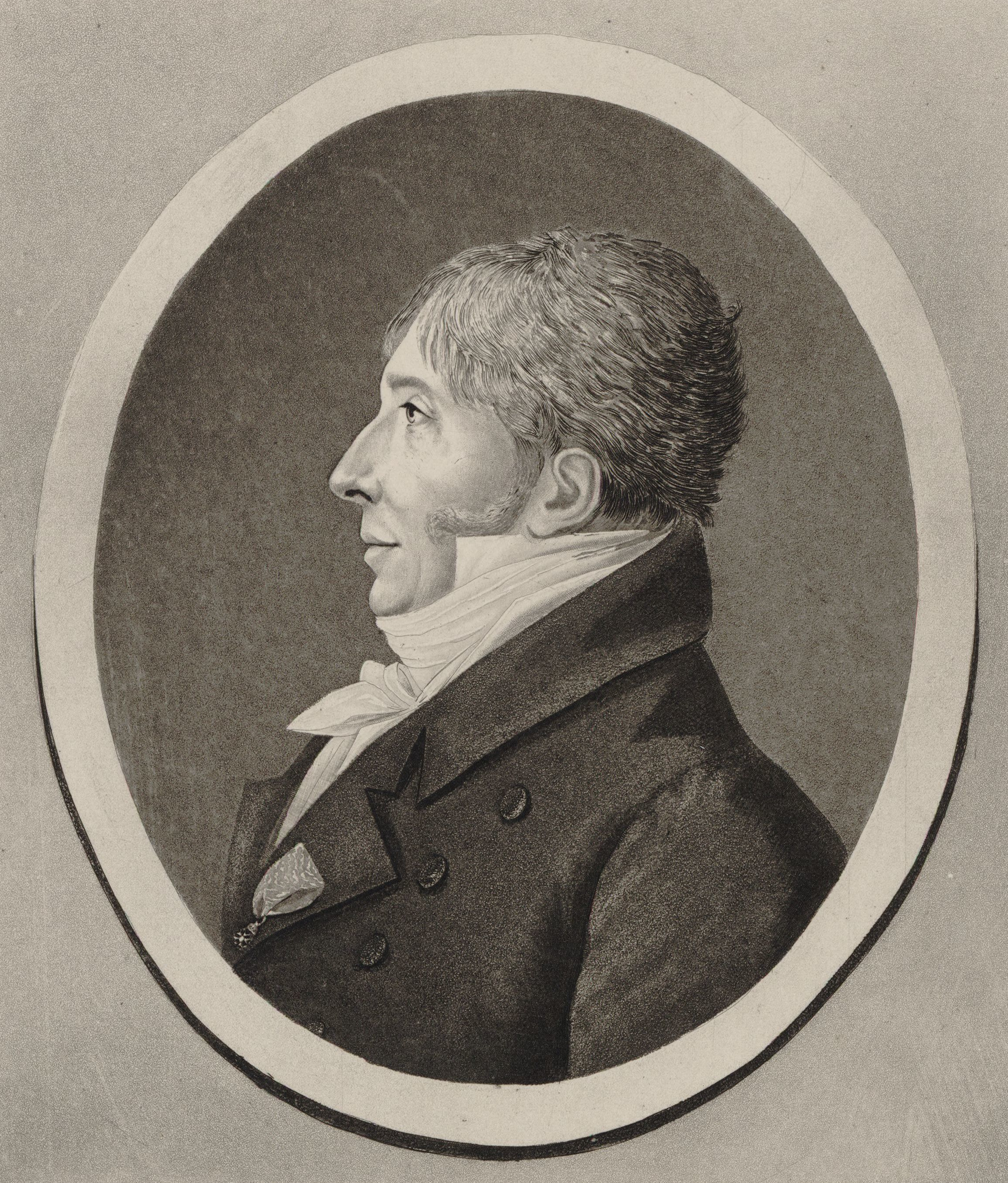
Jean-François Le Sueur

Ossian, ou Les bardes (English: Ossian, or The Bards) is an opera in five acts by the French composer Jean-François Le Sueur. The libretto, by Alphonse François "Paul" Palat-Dercy and Jacques-Marie Deschamps, is based on the Ossian poems of James Macpherson (specifically the poem "Calthon and Colmal"), which had been translated into French by Pierre-Prime-Félicien Le Tourneur.

== Performance history ==
Le Sueur probably began work on the opera as early as 1795. It was first performed at the Paris Opera on 10 July 1804. The premiere was a huge success, especially with Emperor Napoleon, who was a great admirer of the Ossian poems. Napoleon was so enthusiastic, he invited the composer to join him in the imperial box at the third act and the next day he sent Le Sueur a gold casket engraved "The Emperor Napoleon to the author of Les bardes", containing the cross of the Légion d'honneur. The opera received almost 70 performances over the next 12 years.

== Roles ==
Roles, voice types, premiere cast
Role	Voice type	Premiere cast, 10 July 1804 Conductor: Jean-Baptiste Rey
Ossian	tenor	Étienne Lainez
Duntalmo	bass	Auguste-Athanase (Augustin) Chéron
Rosmala	soprano	Marie-Aimable Armand
Mornal	tenor	Nicolas Roland
Rozmar	bass	Martin-Joseph Adrien
Hydala	baritone	François Lays
Salgar	bass	Jean-Honoré Bertin
A bard	bass	Jean-Blaise Martin
A Caledonian woman	soprano	Jannard
A soldier	tenor	Casimir Eloy

== Synopsis ==
The opera is set in an imaginary Scotland in the third century AD. Caledonia has been invaded by the Scandinavians under their leader Duntalmo. He oppresses the Caledonians and imposes the worship of Odin on them. He also plans to marry his son Mornal to Rosmala, daughter of the bard Rozmor, who is already betrothed to the bard and warrior Ossian. Finally, a group of Caledonians defeat the Scandinavians and Ossian is able to marry Rosmala.

== The work ==
The opera is on an epic scale and contains many experimental elements. For instance, act 4 has visions of heroes and bards in a cave behind a backlit curtain of gauze. The score also calls for 12 harps as the bards hymn the rising sun. According to the musicologist David Charlton, Les bardes turns away from the classical aesthetic of Gluck (the dominant operatic influence of the time in France) and prefigures grand opera. The work had an influence on Le Sueur's most famous pupil, Hector Berlioz.
