= Dufresny =

Dufresny is a surname. Notable people with the surname include:

- Charles Rivière Dufresny (1648–1724), a French dramatist

== See also ==
- Dufrenoy
