= Horace (play) =

Horace is a play by the French dramatist Pierre Corneille, drawing on Livy's account of the battle between the Horatii and the Curiatii. Written in reply to critics of his Le Cid, it was dedicated to cardinal Richelieu and proved the author's second major success on its premiere in March 1640. Its protagonist Horatius is more daring than Rodrigue in Le Cid, in that he sacrifices his best friend and kills his sister Camilla. It was the basis for the libretti for the operas Les Horaces and Gli Orazi e i Curiazi. It is considered one of Corneille's great tragedies.

== Plot summary ==
The play, which begins in Rome, starts out in an atmosphere of peace and happiness. The Roman Horatii family is united to the Alban Curatii family. The young Horace is married to Sabine, a young Alban woman whose brother, Curiace, is engaged to Camille, the sister of Horace.

But the fratricidal war which breaks out between the two cities destroys this harmony. To finish it, each city designates three champions to fight in single combat to determine who will win. Contrary to expectations, fate chooses the three Horatii brothers for Rome and the three Curiatii brothers for Alba Longa. Horace, astonished, did not expect such a great honor. The friends once again find themselves face to face, with their consciences resolved for different reasons. While Horace is motivated by his patriotic duty, Curiace laments his cruel fate.

The people are likewise moved to see these six young men, nevertheless closely knit, fighting for the good of their country. However, their fate has been decided. During combat, two Horatii are quickly killed, and the last, the hero of the play, must then confront the three injured Curiatii alone. Filled with cunning and bravery, he first pretends to flee to avoid facing them all together. Then, when he attacks, he kills them one by one and thus achieves victory.

After having received the congratulations of all of Rome, Horace kills his sister, who blames him for the murder of her beloved. The trial which follows includes a scene of a rousing plea from the father Horatius, who defends honor (a value very dear to Corneille), and thus Horace, against the romanticism represented by Camille. Horace is acquitted despite the indictment of Valère, a Roman gentleman who was also in love with Camille, much like Curiace.

== Reception ==
This play was criticized at the time of its creation for its failure to conform to notions of a tragic hero: by killing Camille, Horace had lost the necessary innocence. Corneille rejected the notion of changing the death to conform to the academy's doctrine, and so helped prevent neo-Classicism from stifling theater.

This play was a source of inspiration for composers such as Bernardo Porta (1767-1829), Antonio Salieri (1750-1825) and Domenico Cimarosa (1749-1801).
