= Horatius Coclès =

- Opéra comique by Étienne Méhul
- Title page of the libretto, Paris 1794
- Librettist: Antoine-Vincent Arnault
- Language: French
- Premiere: 18 February 1794; Paris Opéra

Horatius Coclès is an opera in one act and nine scenes (styled an acte lyrique) by the French composer Étienne Nicolas Méhul with a libretto by Antoine-Vincent Arnault. It was first performed at the Paris Opéra on 18 February 1794. It is based on the Roman legend of Horatius Cocles.

== Background and performance history ==
Horatius Coclès was created during the Reign of Terror, at the height of the French Revolution, when all works of art were strongly encouraged to have a political purpose. According to Arnault in his memoirs, the piece was intended to curry favour with the revolutionary authorities and thus improve the chances with the censor of a far more important opera Méhul and Arnault were then working on, Mélidore et Phrosine. The revolutionaries viewed the early Roman Republic as one of the models for their new state. Arnault saw parallels between the Rome of Horatius, which had just expelled its kings, and Revolutionary France, fighting against the crowned heads of Europe. Arnault claimed that he and Méhul finished the opera in 17 days.

The opera initially had 18 performances in 1794, featuring sumptuous scenery. Arnault wrote that the authorities deemed it sufficiently patriotic to ease the path of Mélidore et Phrosine to the stage. It was revived for a further 9 performances between November 1797 and January 1798. During one night in the second run, one of the chorus fell off the "Pons Sublicius", taking 50 other performers with him, resulting in multiple injuries to the singer playing the lead. When the work reappeared on 30 December, Napoleon was among the audience.

== Roles ==
Role	Voice type	Premiere Cast, 1794
Valerius Publicola, a consul	baritone	François Lays
Horace Coclès (Horatius Cocles)	bass-baritone	Augustin Chéron
Mutius Scévola (Mucius Scaevola)	tenor	Étienne Lainez (or Lainé)
Le jeune Horace (Young Horatius)	haute-contre	Jean-Joseph Rousseau
Un ambassadeur de Porsenna (An ambassador from Porsenna)	bass-baritone	Dufresne
Chorus of senators, Romans, soldiers, captives

== Synopsis ==
Méhul in 1799; portrait by Antoine Gros

Scene: a view of Rome, including the Pons Sublicius and the camp of Lars Porsenna

A chorus of Romans mourns the death of Lucius Junius Brutus, who had led them to expel King Tarquin and found the republic. The city is now besieged by the Etruscan king Lars Porsenna, who wants to reinstall the Roman royal family, and the people are starving. Horatius takes a dagger and swears on the tomb to pursue the ruin of the kings and maintain the liberty of Rome. Mucius Scaevola enters dressed as an Etruscan and declares his intention to infiltrate the enemy camp and assassinate Porsenna, even at the cost of his own life. Horatius begs to be allowed to undertake the mission instead, since he is old, but Publicola tells him he is too famous for the disguise to work. Mucius sets off.

Publicola rewards Horatius' loyalty by entrusting him with the defence of the Pons Sublicius, the bridge across the River Tiber, while Publicola leads the main Roman army against the enemy. An envoy arrives from Porsenna, accompanied by Roman captives, including Horatius' son, young Horatius, whom he had believed dead. The envoy offers to hand over the captives if the Romans will accept their kings back. Horatius, his son and the assembled Romans flatly refuse this offer. The Etruscans attack and Horatius defends the bridge single-handedly while the Romans chop through it behind him. The bridge collapses and Horatius and the Etruscans plunge into the Tiber, but Horatius survives. Mucius Scaevola returns and tells how he had managed to gain access to Porsenna's camp, but instead of killing Porsenna he had struck down a courtier who had insulted Rome. He told Porsenna that he was one of 300 Romans who had vowed to kill him. Mucius had thrust his hand into the fire to punish it for the failure of his mission. Porsenna had been so impressed by this action that he had abandoned his attempt to conquer Rome. The opera ends with the return of the victorious Publicola, bringing back Horatius' son among the other freed captives.

== Music ==
According to Arnault, Méhul described the austere style of Horatius Coclès as "iron music." The work has no roles for female soloists, a feature which is relatively rare in the history of opera but not so unusual among propaganda works of the French Revolutionary era. Elizabeth Bartlet comments that Méhul "did not hesitate to find a musical equivalent for 'fraternité' [i.e. fraternity, one of the chief French Revolutionary virtues]. In Horatius Coclès the little music for soloists, apart from recitative to advance the plot, is for the most part in the form of duos and trios, not solos." The D major overture, which has been described as Beethovian, was a favourite of Thomas Beecham and praised by Castil-Blaze as one of Méhul's best.

== Recording ==
Overture only: Méhul Overtures, the Orchestre de Bretagne, conducted by Stefan Sanderling, ASV CD DCA 1140 (2002).

== Sources ==
- Adélaïde de Place Étienne Nicolas Méhul (Bleu Nuit Éditeur, 2005)
- Elizabeth Bartlet, entry on Méhul in the New Grove Dictionary of Music and Musicians
- Malcolm Boyd (ed.) Music and the French Revolution (Cambridge University Press, 2008), includes the chapter "The new repertoire at the Opéra during the Reign of Terror: Revolutionary rhetoric and operatic consequences" by Elizabeth Bartlet
