= Colinette à la cour =

1782 comic opera by André Grétry

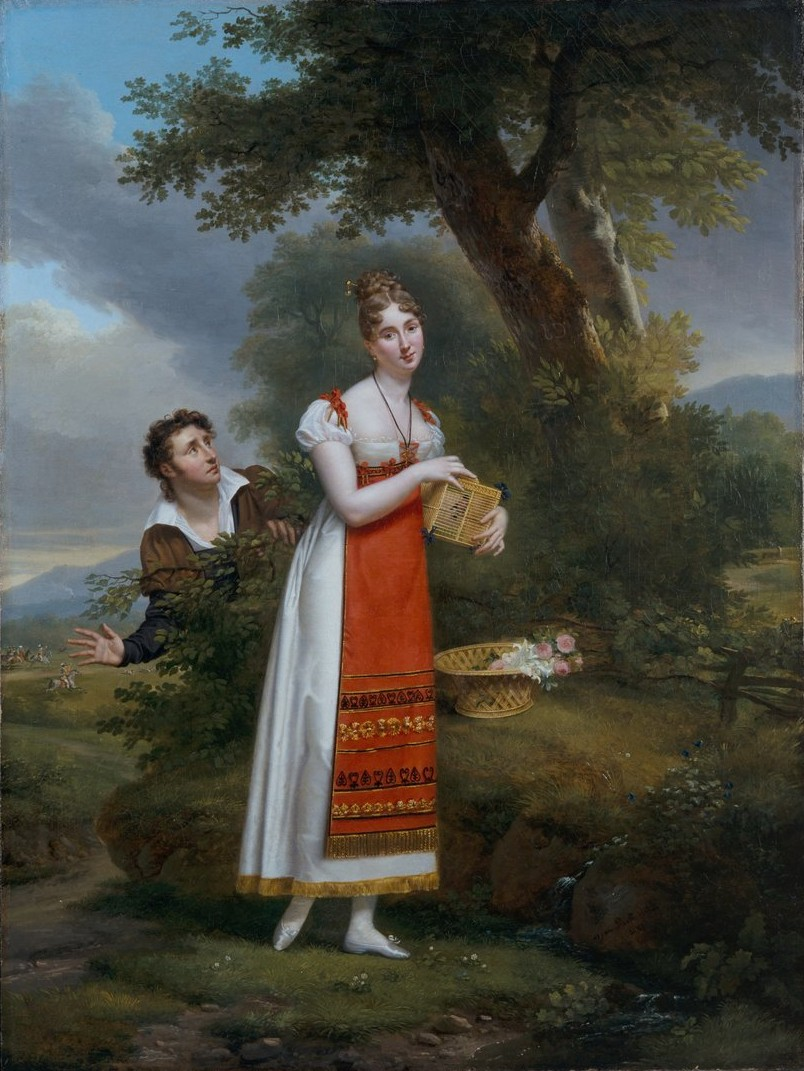
Portrait of Mme Granier in the role of Colinette à la cour (Act I, Scene VII), painting by Adèle Romany, 1814

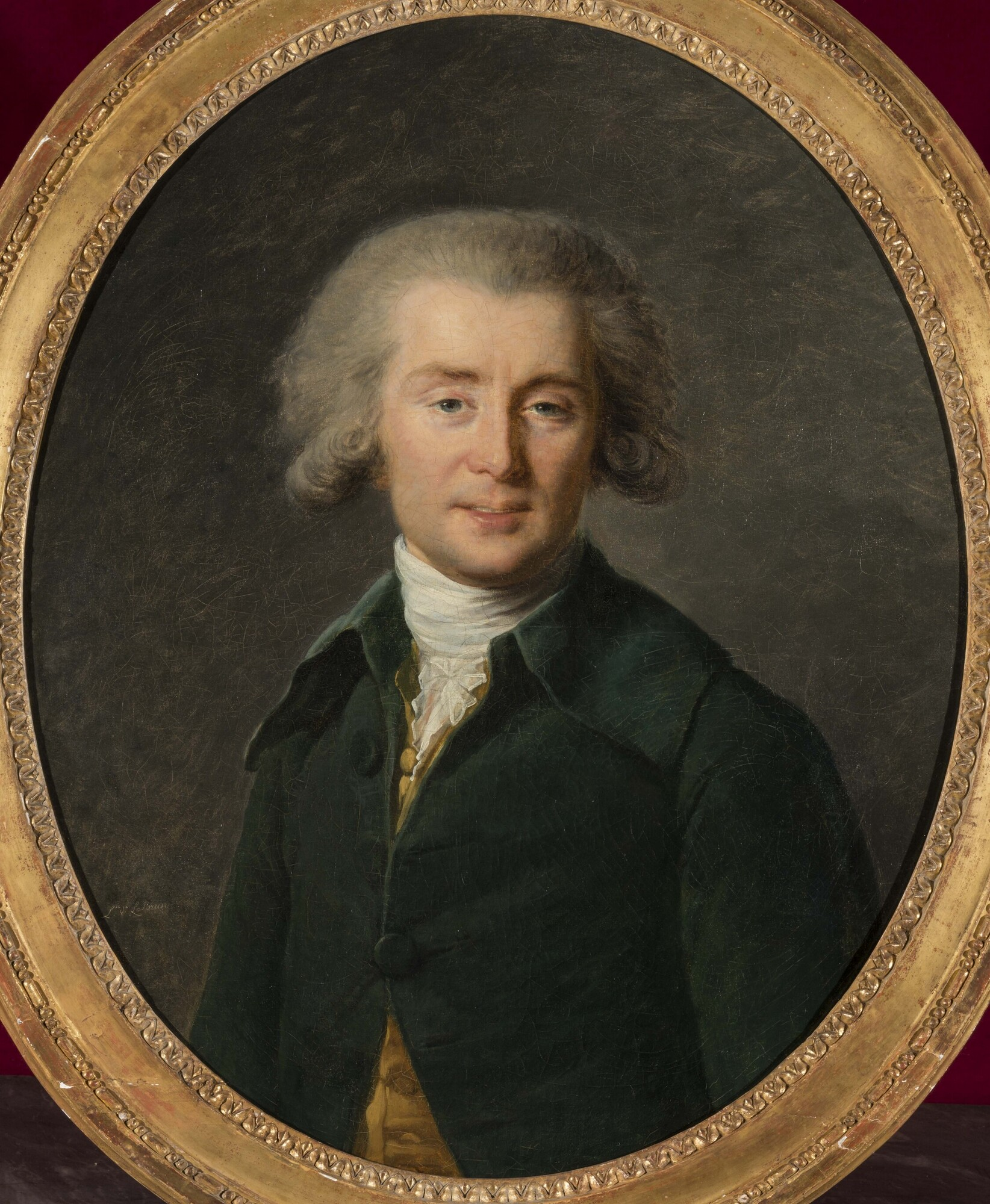
The composer André Grétry

La double épreuve, ou Colinette à la cour, is a comédie lyrique (comic opera) in three acts written by André Grétry in 1782 to a French libretto by Jean-Baptiste Lourdet de Santerre, based on Charles Simon Favart's Ninette à la cour.

== Performance history ==
It was first performed on 1 January 1782 by the Académie Royale de Musique (Paris Opera) at the Théâtre de la Porte-Saint-Martin, and included choreography by Maximilien Gardel.

== Roles ==
Role	Voice type	Premiere Cast, 1 January 1782 (Conductor: - )
Prince Alphonse, Duke of Milan	tenor	Étienne Lainez
Countess Amelie	soprano	Marie-Josephine Laguerre
Julien, in love with Colinette	basse-taille (bass-baritone)	Auguste-Athanase (Augustin) Chéron
Colinette	soprano	Josèphe-Eulalie Audinot
Bastien, in love with Justine	baritone	François Lays (also spelled Lay or Laïs)
Justine	soprano	Anne-Marie-Jeanne Gavaudan "l'aînée"
Mathurine, Justine's mother	soprano	Suzanne Joinville
The bailiff	haute-contre	M Tirot (also spelled Thirot)
A shepherd	?	?
A shepherdess	soprano	Mlle Rosalie
A gipsy	baritone	François Lays
A gipsy woman	soprano	Anne-Marie Jeanne Gavaudan "aînée"
A child, representing Cupid	soprano	Mlle Nanine
A boy of the village	?	M Touvois
Fabrice, a confidant of the Prince	basse-taille (bass-baritone)	M. Moreau
A lady-in-waiting	soprano	Gertrude Girardin
An old man	haute-contre	M Jalaguier
