= La mort d'Adam =

1809 opera by Jean-François Le Sueur

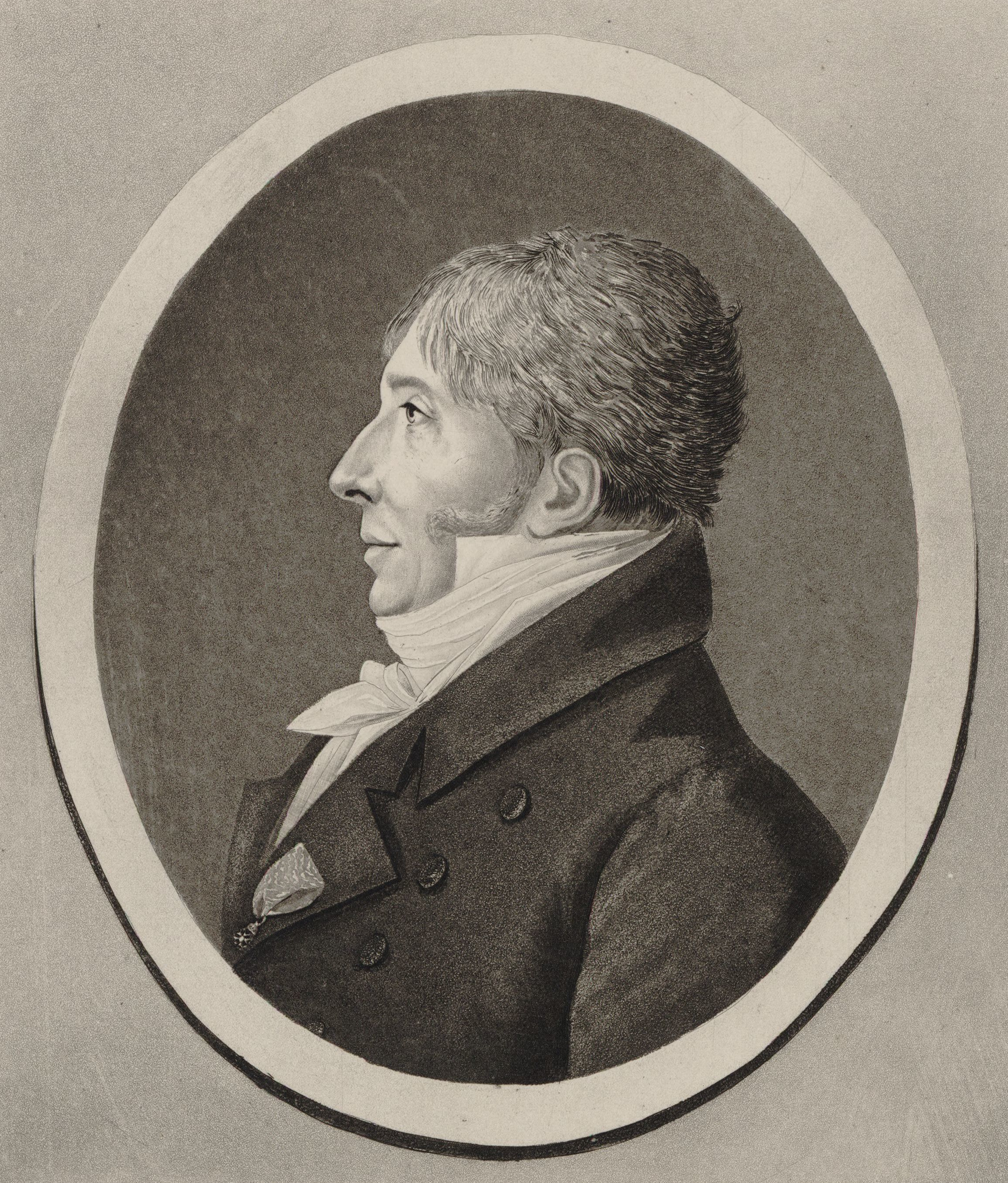
Jean-François Le Sueur, the opera's composer

La mort d'Adam (French pronunciation: [la mɔʁ dadɑ̃], lit. 'The Death of Adam') is a tragédie lyrique on a biblical theme in 3 acts by Jean-François Le Sueur with a French libretto by Nicolas-François Guillard after Klopstock, first performed in 1809, though written a few years earlier. Musicologist Winton Dean described the work as "the most comprehensive and spectacular opera ever conceived", noting that it "combines a Klopstock play with substantial portions of the Book of Genesis and Paradise Lost" and a cast which extends from "the entire human race... the total population of heaven and hell", and with a "Leitmotiv system" of twelve themes, some recalled in combination.

== Composition and performance history ==
Le Sueur wrote the opera while working as an instructor at the Conservatoire de Musique in Paris. The opera was initially scheduled to be performed at the Conservatoire but was dropped in favor of Charles-Simon Catel's Sémiramis. Upset over this decision, Le Sueur published anonymously a pamphlet entitled Projet d'un plan général de l'instruction musicale en France, in which he harshly criticized the methods of instruction followed at the Conservatoire, his rival Catel, and Catel's patron, the director of the Conservatoire. Le Sueur was subsequently fired from the Conservatoire on 23 September 1802, and the composer lived in a state of poverty for about a year before he became maître de chapelle to the First Consul in Paris in early 1804.

Eventually, Le Sueur was able to mount a production of La mort d'Adam. The opera was first performed at the Académie impériale in Paris on 21 March 1809, with a choreography by Louis-Jacques Milon (act 1) and Pierre-Gabriel Gardel (acts 2, 3), "but it failed to arouse much enthusiasm and had to be dropped from the repertory permanently on 4 February 1810 after 16 performances".

Winton Dean argues that the opera had a great influence on Berlioz, Le Sueur's pupil shortly after the full score was published, and that "certain elements in Berlioz's style can be explained only by reference to Le Sueur". He points to the distinction between a grand overall design and a restrained, classical means of musical utterance, and to the sequence of separate tableaux of dramatic power with connecting narratives omitted or just implicit; in addition, there are symphonies fantastiques and a symphonie funèbre in La mort d'Adam. Le Sueur annotated his score, in French and Italian, with explanations about the musical language in antiquity which he had incorporated into his work, and some of these devices are found in later works by Berlioz, such as Les Troyens and L'enfance du Christ.

== Roles ==
Roles, voice types, premiere cast
Role	Voice type	Premiere cast, 21 March 1809
Adam	bass	Henri-Étienne Dérivis
Seth	baritone	François Lays or Lay
Caïn	tenor	Étienne Lainez
L'ombre d'Abel, the shade of Abel	tenor	Louis Nourrit
L'ange de la mort, the angel of Death	bass	Mr Bonel
Satan	bass	Jean-Honoré Bertin
Éve	soprano	Marie-Thérèse Davoux, called Mlle Maillard
Sélime	soprano	Mme Granier
Sunim	?	?
Coryphée, coryphaeus	bass	Mr Martin
Coryphée, coryphaea	soprano	Mlle Pauline
