= Œdipe à Colone =

Opera by Antonio Sacchini

- Tragédie lyrique by Antonio Sacchini
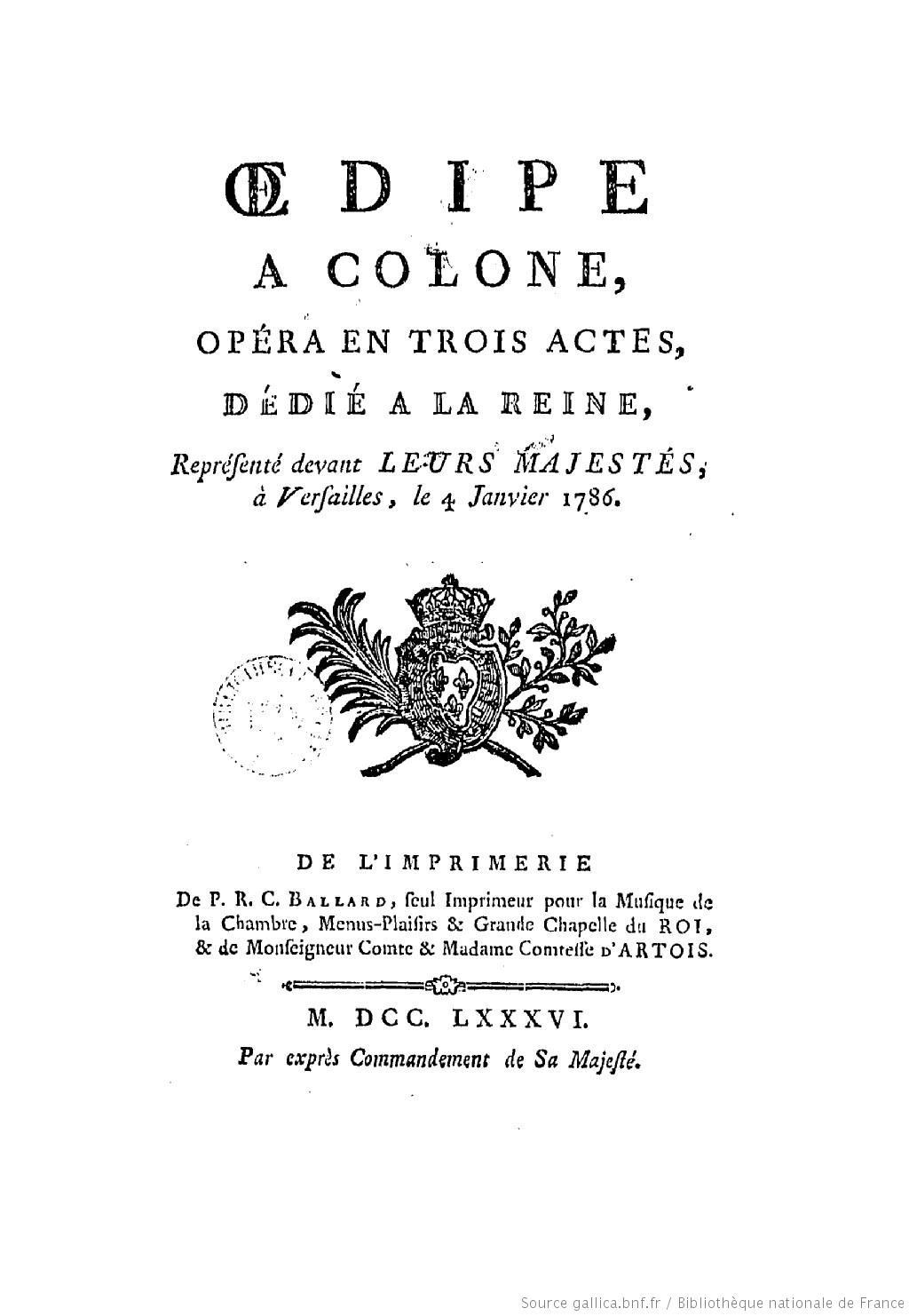
- Title page of the first print
- Librettist: Nicolas-François Guillard
- Language: French
- Based on: Oedipus at Colonus by Sophocles
- Premiere: 4 January 1786; Palace of Versailles

Œdipe à Colone (French pronunciation: [edip a kɔlɔn]) is an operatic tragédie lyrique by Antonio Sacchini first performed at Versailles on 4 January 1786 in the presence of King Louis XVI and Marie Antoinette. The libretto, by Nicolas-François Guillard, is based on the play Oedipus at Colonus by Sophocles. The premiere, intended to inaugurate the new theatre at Versailles, was not a success, possibly due to the quality of the performances, the staging, or the acoustics. Marie Antoinette promised Sacchini a better production at Fontainebleau in the autumn, but the Affair of the Diamond Necklace meant she was unable to fulfil her wish. The news that the production was cancelled is said to have hastened the death of the already seriously ill composer on October 9, 1786. Œdipe was given a posthumous performance by the Paris Opera at the Théâtre de la Porte Saint-Martin on February 1, 1787. This time the audience was warmly appreciative and the opera became one of the most popular pieces in the repertoire for several decades, reaching a total of almost 600 performances by 1844.

== Roles ==
Roles, voice types, premiere cast
| Role | Voice type | Premiere, 4 January 1786 (Conductor: Jean-Baptiste Rey) |
|---|---|---|
| Antigone | soprano | Anne Chéron (née Cameroy, called "M.lle Dozon") |
| Polynice | tenor | Étienne Lainez |
| Thésée | baritenor | Louis-Claude-Armand Chardin ("Chardini") |
| Œdipe | basse-taille (bass-baritone) | Auguste-Athanase (Augustin) Chéron |
| Eriphile | soprano | Adelaïde Gavaudan, cadette |
| Le grand prêtre, the High Priest | basse-taille (bass-baritone) | M Moreau |
| Un coryphée, a coryphaeus | baritenor | Martin |
| Une athénienne, an Athenian woman | soprano | Anne-Marie Jeanne Gavaudan, l'aînée |
| Une voix, a voice | haute-contre | |
| Un Herault, a herald | basse-taille (bass-baritone) | Châteaufort |

== Synopsis ==
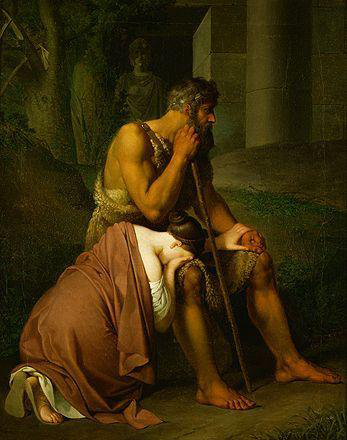
Oedipe et Antigone (1809) by Johann Peter Krafft

=== Background ===
The plot is based on the myth of Oedipus, King of Thebes. Oedipus has been expelled from the city after it was revealed he had killed his father and married his mother. Now blind and aged he wanders through Greece accompanied only by his daughter Antigone. Meanwhile, the throne of Thebes has been divided between Oedipus' two sons, Eteocles and Polynices. But the two have quarrelled and Eteocles has driven out Polynices, who seeks refuge with Theseus, King of Athens.

=== Act 1 ===
The opera begins with Polynices and Theseus striking a pact: Polynices will marry Theseus' daughter, Eriphyle, and Theseus will help him retake the throne of Thebes, thus forging an alliance between that city and Athens. The Athenians celebrate and Theseus and Polynices go to the temple to offer a sacrifice. Polynices feels guilty he banished his father Oedipus from Thebes. As he sacrifices, the temple fire goes out, a symbol of the anger of the Furies.

=== Act 2 ===
Polynices wanders outside the temple where he sees an old man being led by a girl. It is Oedipus and Antigone. Oedipus senses the presence of the Furies and is sent temporarily insane. Antigone pleads with the gods to have mercy on her father. A crowd appears and when they learn the identity of Oedipus they want to drive him away, but Theseus stops them and offers the old man his hospitality.

=== Act 3 ===
Polynices tells Antigone he is so remorseful he would give up everything, including Eriphyle, to be forgiven by his father. Antigone tries to reconcile Oedipus and his son, but Oedipus reacts by accusing her of disloyalty and cursing both Polynices and Eteocles. Only when Polynices begs his father to kill him with his own hands does Oedipus take pity on his son. This act of forgiveness earns the mercy of the gods. The wrath of the Furies is appeased.

== Instrumentation ==
Œdipe à Colone is scored for 2 flutes, 2 oboes, 2 horns, timpani, and strings. Like most classical period works, the presence of continuo instruments like bassoons and harpsichord is assumed as well. Some modern performances have used a thunder sheet to represent the stormy anger of the gods portrayed at the end of Act I.

== Recordings ==
Order of characters: Œdipe, Antigone, Polynice, Thésée, Eriphile, the High Priest, an Athenian woman, a coryphaeus, a herald

- MRF (Morgan Recording Federation) 153 (1977) – Renato Bruson, Radmila Bakočević, Herbert Handt, Juan Oncina, Maria Candida, Robert Amis El-Age, Nicoletta Panni, Walter Brighi (tenore), Giuseppe Scaleo – Coro e Orchestra da camera "Alessandro Scarlatti" Napoli Radiotelevisione italiana, conducted by Franco Caracciolo (radio live recording 1971, sung in Italian)
- Dynamic 494/1-2 CD – Sviatoslav Smirnov (baritone), Manon Feubel (soprano), Fabrice Mantegna (tenor), Daniel Galvez-Vallejo (tenor), Raphaëlle Farman (soprano), Jacques Gay (bass-baritone), Géraldine Casey (soprano), not indicated, Chœur de Chambre et Orchestre de la Camerata de Bourgogne, conducted by Jean-Paul Penin (first world recording June 2004, published 2005)
- Naxos, 2006 CD – François Loup (bass-baritone), Nathalie Paulin (soprano), Robert Getchell (tenor), Tony Boutté (tenor), Kirsten Blaise (soprano), Jonathan Kimple (bass-baritone), Kara Morgan, Philip Cave (tenor), Jason Kaminski (baritone), Opera Lafayette Orchestra and Chorus, conducted by Ryan Brown

== Sources ==
- Œdipe à Colone, Opéra en trois Actes, Dédié a la Reine, Représenté devant leurs Majestés à Versailles, le 4 Janvier 1786 (in French). Paris: Ballard. 1786 – via Gallica.
- Œdipe à Colone. Opéra en trois Actes, Représenté, pour la première fois, devant leurs Majestés à Versailles le 4 Janvier 1786, et par l'Académie Royale de Musique le 1er Fevrier 1787 (in French). Paris: Magnian. n.d. – via Gallica.
- Casaglia, Gherardo (2005). "Œdipe à Colone, 4 January 1786". L'Almanacco di Gherardo Casaglia (in Italian).
