= Bernardo Porta =

Italian composer (1758–1829)

Bernardo Porta (1758 in Rome – 11 June 1829 in Paris) was an Italian composer who was active in France.

== Biography ==
After composition lessons with Magrini, Bernardo Porta became maestro di cappella and director of the orchestra at Tivoli. After returning to Rome, he went into service at the court of Constantin Alexandre, prince of Salm-Salm. During this period of Porta's life, he wrote his first opera La Principessa d'Amalfi (1780) for the Teatro Argentina, but it had little success.

In 1788 Porta moved to France, where he composed Le diable à quatre ou La double métamorphose (1790) on a libretto by Michel-Jean Sedaine for the Théâtre Italien. During the French Revolution, he wrote Agricol Viala, ou Le héros de treize ans (1794), a one-act opéra comique, which glorified a martyr of the revolution, Joseph Agricol Viala.

Porta's 3-act opera Les Horaces with a libretto by Nicolas-François Guillard (based on a play by Corneille) was premiered by the Paris Opéra at the Théâtre de la République et des Arts on 18 October 1800. Guillard's libretto had already been set by Antonio Salieri as Les Horaces (premiered by the Opéra in 1786), but this work had been a failure and was dropped after three performances. However, Porta's opera did not do much better and was presented on only nine occasions. Porta's was the third work with this name to be performed at the Opéra. The first was a 5-act ballet, premiered in 1777 with music by Josef Starzer and choreography by Jean-Georges Noverre. Porta's opera would be totally forgotten today, except for an attempted assassination of Napoleon, which occurred at the theatre during one of its performances. His opera paid homage to the painting Oath of the Horatii by his friend Jacques Louis David.

His last opera to be performed was Le connétable de Clisson, which premiered at the Opéra on 9 or 10 February 1804. Critics described it as mediocre. It received eighteen performances over two years.

Porta also composed masses, motets, oratorios and some instrumental music: 6 duo's for two cello's, 2 trio's, 3 quartets for flute, violin, alto and bass, and quintets. Most of this instrumental music was intended for beginners.

He died on 11 June 1829 due to cholera.

== Operas ==
- 1780 : La Princesse d'Amalfi
- 1788 : Le Diable à quatre ou la Double Métamorphose
- 1791 : Pagamin
- 1793 : La Blanche Haquenée
- 1793 : Alexis et Rosette, ou les Houlans
- 1794 : La Réunion du 10 août, ou l'Inauguration de la République
- 1794 : Agricol Viala, ou le Héros de 13 ans
- 1797 : Le Pauvre Aveugle, ou la Chanson savoyarde
- 1797 : L'Oracle
- 1798 : Le Prisonnier français, ou le Bienfait récompensé
- 1800 : Deux morts qui se voient
- 1800 : Les Deux Statues
- 1800 : Les Horaces
- 1802 : Le Vieux de la montagne
- 1804 : Le Connétable de Clisson

== Other works ==
=== Vocal works ===
- 1788 : Cantate à Mr le Baron de Bagge ... pour le jour de sa fête (Moline)
- masses
- motets
- 2 oratorios

=== Instrumental Music ===
- 6 duo's for two cello's
- 2 trio's
- 3 quartets for flute, violin, alto and bass
- 3 duos pour commençants for two flutes
- quintets

== Bibliography ==
- Letailleur, Paulette, revised by David Charlton (2001). "Porta, Bernardo" in The New Grove Dictionary of Music and Musicians, 2nd edition, edited by Stanley Sadie. London: Macmillan. ISBN 9781561592395 (hardcover). OCLC 419285866 (eBook).
- Lajarte, Théodore de (1878). Bibliothèque musicale du Théâtre de l'Opéra, volume 2 [1793–1876]. Paris: Librairie des Bibliophiles. View at Google Books.
- Pitou, Spire (1985). The Paris Opera: An Encyclopedia of Operas, Ballets, Composers, and Performers. Rococo and Romantic, 1715–1815. Westport, Connecticut: Greenwood Press. ISBN 9780313243943.
- Van Boer, Bertil (2012). Historical Dictionary of Music of the Classical Period. Lanham/Toronto/Plymouth, UK: The Scarecrow Press. ISBN 9780810871830.
- Wild, Nicole; Charlton, David (2005). Théâtre de l'Opéra-Comique Paris: répertoire 1762-1972. Sprimont, Belgium: Editions Mardaga. ISBN 9782870098981.
