= Proserpine (Paisiello) =

French-language opera

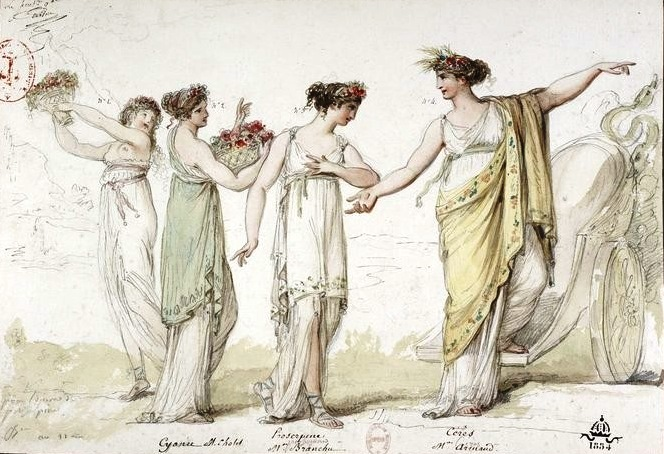
Berthélemy's costumes for the 1803 premiere depicting (left to right) a nymph, Cyané, Proserpine, and Cérès

Proserpine is a French-language opera by the Italian composer Giovanni Paisiello. It takes the form of a tragédie lyrique in three acts. The libretto, by Nicolas-François Guillard, is a reworking of Philippe Quinault's Proserpine. Paisiello's opera was first performed on 28 March 1803 at the Paris Opéra.

== Background ==
Paisiello was the favourite composer of Napoleon Bonaparte. When Napoleon became First Consul of France in 1801, he invited Paisiello to Paris to become his private maître de chapelle. The seventy-one-year-old musician was reluctant to leave Naples but King Ferdinand IV pressured him to agree in order to help Franco-Neapolitan diplomatic relations.

Paisiello arrived in Paris in 1802. Here the Opéra proposed he should write a setting of Guillard's reworking of Proserpine, a libretto by Philippe Quinault originally set by Jean-Baptiste Lully and premiered in 1680. The fashion for such reworkings had emerged in the late 18th century. Examples include Gluck's Armide (1777) and J.C. Bach's Amadis de Gaule (1779). Lully and Quinault were considered the founders of the tragédie lyrique, the genre which was the heart of serious French opera, but by the Classical period Lully's music seemed dated. Reusing Quinault's libretti was a way of asserting the continuity of the national musical tradition and ensuring foreign composers, such as Gluck and Paisiello, were tied into it. Guillard, following the fashionable model of Metastasian drama, reduced Quinault's libretto from five to three acts, concentrating the action on the main plot, the god Pluto's abduction of Proserpina.

== Performance history ==
Napoleon and the Opéra management admired Paisiello's score but it was not a success with the Parisian public. In writing the opera, Paisiello was hampered by his unfamiliarity with the French language and he found it hard to adapt his own style to the conventions of the tragédie lyrique. Proserpine was withdrawn from the Opéra stage after its 13th performance (on 6 December 1803) and was never revived there. Paisiello never wrote another French-language opera and in 1804 he returned to Italy.

Some time between 1806 and 1808, Paisiello asked Giuseppe Sanseverino to translate the libretto into Italian, but this version remained unperformed until 1988 when it was staged at Bagni di Lucca as part of the Marlia International Festival. The original French version was revived at the Festival della Valle d'Itria in Martina Franca in 2003. A live recording was issued the following year.

== Roles ==
Role	Voice type	Premiere cast, 28 March 1803
Pluton (Pluto)	baritone	François Lays
Ascalaphe (Ascalaphus)	tenor	M Laforêt
Proserpine	soprano	Alexandrine-Caroline Branchu
Cérès (Ceres)	soprano	Anne-Aimée Armand
Jupiter	basse-taille (bass-baritone)	Jean-Honoré Bertin
Cyané	soprano	Mlle Chollet
Furies	2 tenors and a basse-taille	MM. Lefebvre, Martin and Picard
Judges of the Underworld	2 tenors and a basse-taille	M Bonnet, Casimir Éloy and Nicolas Roland
A blessed spirit	soprano	
A nymph	soprano	

== Recording ==
- Proserpine Sara Allegretta (Proserpine), Piero Guarnera (Pluton), Maria Laura Martorana (Cérès), Bratislava Chamber Choir, Orchestra Internazionale d'Italia, conducted by Giuliano Carella (Dynamic, 2004)

== Sources ==
- (in Italian) Francesco Blanchetti, Proserpine, in Piero Gelli and Filippo Poletti (editors), Dizionario dell'Opera 2008 (new edition), Milan, Baldini Castoldi Dalai, 2007, pp. 1055-1056, ISBN 978-88-6073-184-5 (Available online at Opera Manager)
- Spire Pitou, The Paris Opéra. An Encyclopedia of Operas, Ballets, Composers, and Performers – Rococo and Romantic, 1715-1815, Westport/London, Greenwood Press, 1985. ISBN 0-313-24394-8
- Essay by Pierre Serié in the book accompanying Didier Talpain's recording of J.C. Bach's Amadis de Gaule (Ediciones Singulares, 2012). ISBN 978-84-939-6860-1
