= Jacques-Marie Deschamps =

French playwright and writer (1750–1826)

Jacques-Marie Deschamps (French pronunciation: [ʒak maʁi deʃɑ̃]; 1750, Paris – 1826) was an 18th–19th-century French playwright, librettist and writer.

During the French First Empire, Deschamps was Joséphine de Beauharnais's "secrétaire des commandements" and remained at her service after the divorce from Napoléon.

Deschamps presented la Revanche forcée (1792), Piron chez ses amis (1792), Poinsinet ou que les gens d’esprit sont bêtes (1793), Dufresny ou le Mariage impromptu (1796) at Théâtre du Vaudeville as well as some other plays in collaboration with Barré, Radet, Desfontaines, Desprez, the opéra comique Claudine (1794), oratorios, etc.

He authored the lyrics of a Hymne à l'Étre Suprême sung by children 20 prairial an II.

Deschamps gave the Théâtre des Arts Le Pavillon du Calife, ou Almanzor et Zobéïde, opera in two acts and in free verse, in collaboration with Jean-Baptiste-Denis Despré and Étienne Morel de Chédeville, music by Nicolas Dalayrac, 12 April 1804 (22 germinal an XII ). This opera wasn't performed after the third presentation.

He also translated some novels from English such as A Simple Story by Elizabeth Inchbald (1796, 2 vol. in-8°) among others, and gave a French version in verse of Il bardo della Selva Nera by Vincenzo Monti, (1807, in-8°).

Deschamps wrote the libretto for Ossian, ou Les bardes, opera by Jean-François Le Sueur (1804).

He collaborated with the Journal littéraire of Clément de Dijon.

== Sources ==
- Charles Dezobry, Théodore Bachelet and a Société of writers, professors and scholars, Dictionnaire général de biographie et d'histoire de mythologie, de géographie ancienne et moderne comparée, des antiquités et des institutions grecques, romaines, françaises et étrangères, vol. 1, Paris, Charles Delagrave et Cie, 1866, 4th ed. (1st ed. 1857), VII-993 p., 2 vol. and supplement, (p. 780).
- Gustave Vapereau, Dictionnaire universel des littératures, vol. 1, Paris, Hachette, 1876, XVI-2096 p., 3 vol.; 25 cm, (p. 613) col. 1 et 2.
