= Les Horaces =

Opera by Antonio Salieri

- Tragédie lyrique by Antonio Salieri
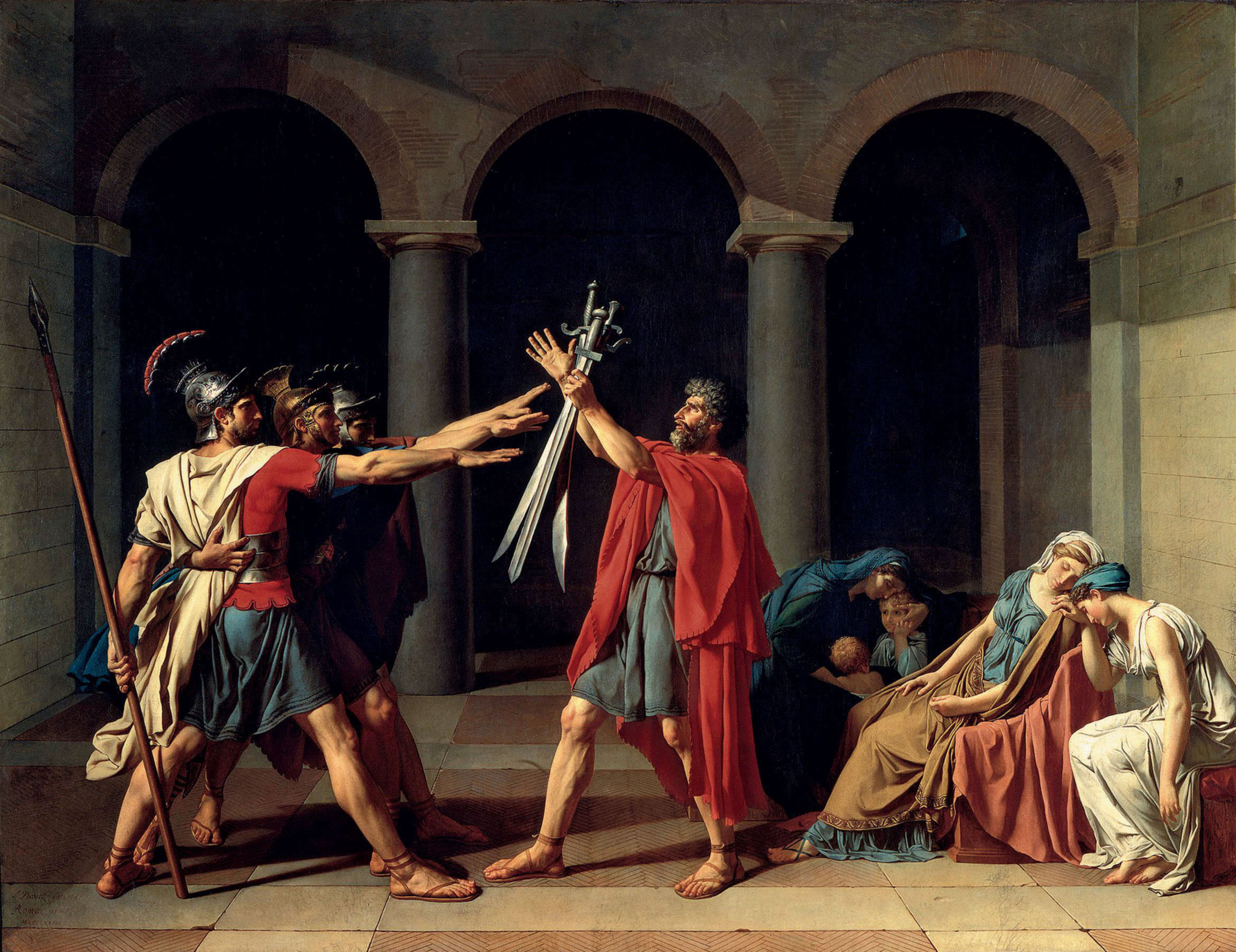
- Oath of the Horatii by Jacques-Louis David, exhibited at the Salon in Paris in 1785 (the year prior to the premiere of the opera in that city), depicts the titular Horatii.
- Librettist: Nicolas-François Guillard
- Language: French
- Based on: Corneille's Horace
- Premiere: 2 November 1786; Palace of Fontainebleau

Les Horaces (The Horatii) is an operatic tragédie lyrique by Antonio Salieri. The text was by Nicolas-François Guillard after Pierre Corneille's Horace.

The opera was commissioned by the Paris Opera after the success of Salieri's Les Danaïdes with the company.

== Performance history ==
According to different sources, Les Horaces was first performed either at Fontainebleau on 2 November 1786, or at Versailles on 2 December 1786. According to Spire Pitou, however, both dates seem to be errors and "the correct date of the world première of Salieri's Les Horaces is 7 December 1786 at the Royal Academy of Music ...". Whatever the case, it was not well received. The failure of the opera to some extent has been blamed on the lackluster performances of the original performers.

== Roles ==
Cast	Voice type	Premiere, 2 December 1786 (Conductor: - )
Old Horace	bass-baritone	Auguste-Athanase (Augustin) Chéron
Young Horace	tenor/baritone	François Lays
Curiace	tenor	Étienne Lainez
Camille	soprano	Antoinette Cécile de Saint-Huberty
A woman of Camille's retinue	soprano	Adélaïde Gavaudan "cadette"
The High Priest	bass-baritone	Martin-Joseph Adrien
Valère	baritone	Claude-Armand Chardin (stage name, "Chardini")
A Roman	bass-baritone	M. Moreau
An Alban	bass-baritone	M. Châteaufort
An oracle	bass-baritone	M. Moreau

== Sources ==
- Original libretto: Les Horaces, Tragédie-Lyrique, en trois actes, mêlée d'intermedes. Représentée devant Leurs Majestés à Fontainebleau, le 2 Novembre 1786, Paris, Ballard, 1786 (a copy online at Gallica - Bibliothèque Nationale de France)
- Pitou, Spire, The Paris Opéra. An Encyclopedia of Operas, Ballets, Composers, and Performers – Rococo and Romantic, 1715-1815, Greenwood Press, Westport/London, 1985 (ISBN 0-313-24394-8)
- Horaces, Les by John A Rice, in 'The New Grove Dictionary of Opera', ed. Stanley Sadie (London, 1992) ISBN 0-333-73432-7
