= Charles Rivière Dufresny =

French playwright

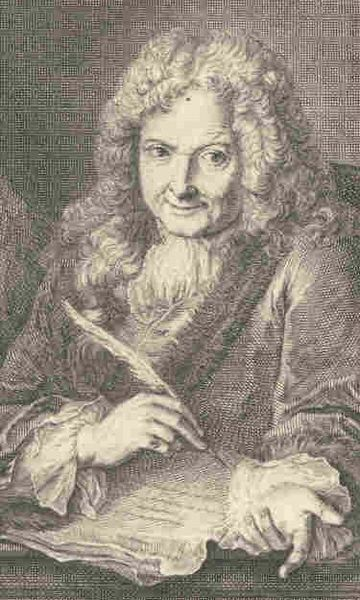
Charles Dufresny

Charles Dufresny, Sieur de la Rivière (1648 – 6 October 1724) was a French playwright.

== Biography ==
Dufresny was born in Paris. The allegation that his grandfather was an illegitimate son of Henry IV procured him the liberal patronage of Louis XIV, who gave him the post of valet de chambre, and affixed his name to many lucrative privileges. Dufresny's expensive habits neutralized all efforts to enrich him, and as if to furnish a piquant commentary on the proverb that poverty makes us acquainted with strange bedfellows, he married, as his second wife, a washerwoman, in discharge of her bill a whimsicality which supplied Alain-René Lesage with an episode in Le Diable boiteux (1707), and was made the subject of a comedy by J.-M. Deschamps (Charles Rivière Dufresny, ou le mariage impromptu). He died in Paris.

His plays, destitute for the most part of all higher qualities, abound in sprightly wit and pithy sayings. In the six volumes of his Théatre (Paris, 1731), some of the best are L'Esprit de contradiction (1700), Le Double Veuvage (1701), La Joueuse (1709), La Coquette de village (1715), La Réconciliation normande (1719) and Le Mariage fait et rompu (1721). A volume of Poésies diverses, two volumes of Nouvelles historiques (1692), and Les Amusements sérieux et comiques d'un Siamois (1705), a work to which Montesquieu was indebted for the idea of his Lettres persanes, complete the list of Dufresny's writings.

The best edition of his works is that of 1747 (4 vols.). His Théatre was edited (1882) by Georges d'Heylli.

His comedies include:

- 1692: L'Opéra de campagne
- 1692: Le Négligent
- 1697: Les fées, ou Contes de ma mère l'oye
- 1697: Le Chevalier joueur
- 1699: La Malade sans maladie
- 1699: La Noce interrompue
- 1700: L'Esprit de contradiction
- 1701: Le Double Veuvage
- 1703: Le Faux Honnête-Homme
- 1708: Le Jaloux honteux
- 1709: La Joueuse
- 1715: La Coquette de village, ou Le lot supposé
- 1719: Le Dédit
- 1719: La Réconciliation normande
- 1721: Le Mariage fait et rompu, ou l'hôtesse de Marseille
- 1731: Le Faux Sincère

He also wrote short stories: Histoire nouvelle et divertissante du Bonhomme Misère, Le Puits de la vérité, histoire gauloise (1698), Amusements sérieux et comiques (Paris, 1699, in-12, Second edition augmented, 1707)? A great part of his Œuvres was collected by d'Alençon, in six volumes in 12° (1731, in 4 volumes in-8° corrected 1747, 1779). Auger published his Œuvres choisies (1801, 2 vol. in-18) and the last edition of his Théâtre dates back to 1881.

== Studies ==
- Les Dominos, comédie inédite, en un acte, en vers libres publiée par Jean Vic. Paris, Hachette, 1917
- Amusements sérieux et comiques, Éd. Vic, Jean, Paris, Bossard, 1921, Édition originale (1699) Read online

== Bibliography ==
- Jean Vic, Les idées de Charles Rivière Dufresny, 2 volumes, Paris, Hachette, 1916-1917
- Georges Jamati, La Querelle du Joueur; Regnard et Dufresny, Paris, Messein, 1936
- François Moureau, Dufresny, auteur dramatique : 1657-1724, Paris Klincksieck, 1979
- François Moureau, Le Mercure galant de Dufresny (1710-1714), ou, Le journalisme à la mode, Oxford Voltaire Foundation at the Taylor Institution, 1982 (ISBN 0-7294-0284-3)
