= Dufrenoy =

Dufrénoy is a surname. Notable people with the surname include:

- Adélaïde Dufrénoy (1765–1825), French poet and painter from Brittany
- Georges Dufrénoy (1870–1943), French artist and post-Impressionism painter
- Ours-Pierre-Armand Petit-Dufrénoy (1792–1857), French geologist and mineralogist
