= Nicolas-François Guillard =

French writer (1752–1814)

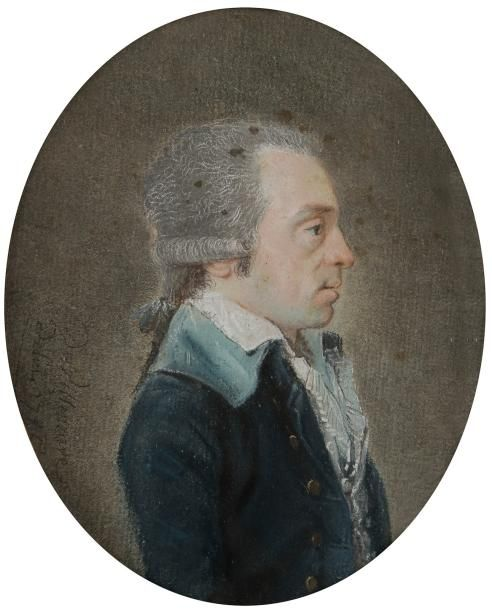
- Born: 16 January 1752; Chartres, France
- Died: 26 December 1814 (aged 62)
- Writing career
- Genre: libretti
- Notable work: Les Horaces; Œdipe à Colone; Iphigénie en Tauride

Nicolas-François Guillard (French pronunciation: [nikɔla fʁɑ̃swa ɡijaʁ]; 16 January 1752 – 26 December 1814) was a French librettist. He was born in Chartres and died in Paris, the recipient of a government pension in recognition of his work writing librettos. He was also on Comité de Lecture of the Paris Opéra. One of the foremost of the French librettist of his generation, he wrote libretti for many noted composers of the day, including Salieri (Les Horaces) and in particular Sacchini (Œdipe à Colone, amongst many others). His most famous work is Iphigénie en Tauride, his first libretto, set by Gluck after the composer had initially rejected it. Gluck collaborated with Guillard to heavily recast the libretto, not only to suit Gluck's artistic preferences, but also to accommodate pre-existing music that Gluck borrowed, both from himself and from other composers, when composing the opera.

Guillard's librettos were often adaptations of previously written works, rather than the products of original invention. He used a wide range of subjects as a starting point, basing his libretto for Sacchini's final opera, Arvire et Évélina, on an English dramatic poem and also using the works of Pierre Corneille on two occasions. In the 1790s he altered his style to fit the revolutionary atmosphere of the time, one of his last works being the epic La mort d'Adam, where he turned to biblical themes.

== Works ==
- 1779: Iphigénie en Tauride, opera in 4 acts, music by Christoph Willibald Gluck, premiered at the Académie royale de musique, 18 May.
- 1781: Émilie ou La Belle Esclave, comédie lyrique in 1 act, music by André Grétry, premiered at the Académie royale de musique, 22 February.
- 1782: Électre, opera in 3 acts, music by Jean-Baptiste Moyne, premiered at the Académie royale de musique, 2 July.
- 1783: Chimène ou le Cid, opera in 3 acts, music by Antonio Sacchini, premiered at Fontainebleau.
- 1784: Dardanus, three-act tragedy, after Charles-Antoine Leclerc de La Bruère, music by Antonio Sacchini, premiered at Trianon, Versailles, 18 September.
- 1786: Les Horaces, tragédie lyrique in 3 acts mingled with intermedes, music by Antonio Salieri, premiered at Fontainebleau, 2 November.
- 1786: Œdipe à Colone, opera in 3 acts, music by Antonio Sacchini, premiered at Versailles, 4 January
- 1788: Arvire et Evélina, tragédie lyrique in 3 acts, music by Antonio Sacchini, premiered at the Académie royale de musique, 29 April.
- 1790: Louis IX en Égypte, opera in 3 acts, with François Andrieux, music by Jean-Baptiste Moyne, premiered at the Académie royale de musique, 15 June;
- 1792: Elfride, heroic drama in 3 acts, music by Jean-Baptiste Moyne, premiered at the Opéra-Comique, 17 December.
- 1793: Miltiade à Marathon, opera in 2 acts, music by Jean-Baptiste Moyne, presented at the Opéra de Paris 15 brumaire an II (5 November)
- 1794: Proserpine, tragédie lyrique in 3 acts, after the libretto by Philippe Quinault, music by Giovanni Paisiello, presented at the Opéra de Paris, 8 germinal an II (28 March)
- 1798: Olimpie, tragédie lyrique in 3 acts, music by Christian Kalkbrenner, presented at the Théâtre de la République et des Arts à Paris, 18 frimaire an VII (8 December)
- 1801: Le Casque et les colombes, opéra-ballet in one act, music by André Grétry, premiered at the Opéra de Paris, 7 November.
- 1809: La Mort d'Adam, religious tragédie lyrique, music by Jean-François Lesueur.

== See also ==
- Category:Libretti by Nicolas-François Guillard
