= Léopold Aimon =

French musician

Pamphile Léopold François Aimon (4 October 1779 – 2 February 1866) was a French cellist and composer.

Aimon was born at L'Isle-sur-la-Sorgue, in the Provence region. He conducted the orchestra of the theatre in Marseille when only seventeen. Aimon moved to Paris in 1817, where he conducted the orchestra of the théâtre du Gymnase in Paris in 1821, and of the Théâtre Français, on the retirement of Antoine-Laurent Baudron, 1822.

His compositional output includes ten operas, some symphonies (only one of which survives), two bassoon concertos, a cello concerto, two cantatas, several sacred vocal works, more than thirty string quartets, and other chamber music. Only two of his operas were performed, Jeux floraux (1818) and Michel et Christine (1821), the last with great success. He was also the author of Connaissances preliminaires de l'harmonie, and other treatises.

He died in Paris.
