= Jean-Marie-Bernard Clément =

French writer and translator (1742–1812)

Jean-Marie-Bernard Clément (25 December 1742 in Dijon – 3 February 1812 in Paris) was a French writer and translator.

== Career ==
He taught philosophy for some time at his home town's college, then he came to Paris where he was protected by Mably and Voltaire recommended him to La Harpe.

As early as in 1771, he gave a first example of the systematic criticisms that would become so typical of his production by being the only one of his contemporaries to disapprove of abbé Delille's translation of Les Géorgiques.

He wrote a tragedy in three acts, Médée (1779), but to no avail. As a collaborator to Le Journal de Monsieur, Le Journal Français and other periodical collections, he became a critic, systematically glorifying the Ancients and the XVII century's classics, and attacking more and more violently the living authors of that time.

Because he had criticized Saint-Lambert, the latter had a lettre de cachet be delivered against him and he was sent to For-l'Évêque for two days. When he was let out, he was even more excited than before, and had become a semi celebrity in the world of literature. He began to virulently attack Voltaire, starting a war that would last for 10 years. Voltaire gave him the nickname "l'inclément" (the inclement one) and mercilessly insulted him. After the French Revolution, he continued .

Besides his works as a critic, Clément wrote Les Satires, a translation of La Jérusalem délivrée (by Le Tasse) in verses, and toms V to VII of the translation of Cicero's work published by Pierre-Antoine Guéroult & Desmeuniers (1783-1789); he reviewed Antoine Galland's translation of the Arabic tales Les onze journées (1796), translated Les Amours de Leucippe et de Clitophon by Achille Tatius (1800) and he helped abbé de La Porte with his Anecdotes dramatiques.

From 1796 onwards, he wrote Le Journal littéraire and other periodical publications.

== Works ==
- 1771: Observations critiques sur la nouvelle traduction en vers françois des Géorgiques de Virgile, et sur les poèmes des Saisons, de la Déclamation et de la Peinture;
- 1772: Nouvelles observations critiques sur différents sujets de littérature;
- 1773–1776: Lettres à M. de Voltaire (9 letters overall);
- 1774: Les Francs-maçons, comedy;
- 1779: Médée, 3 acts tragedy;
- 1784: De la Tragédie, pour servir de suite aux lettres à Voltaire;
- 1785: Essais de critique sur la littérature ancienne et moderne;
- 1786: Satires;
- 1786: Projet de règlement sur la manière de tenir, à l’avenir, les soi-disant philosophes;
- 1788: Petit dictionnaire de la cour et de la ville;
- 1801: Tableau annuel de la littérature française, 5 parts.
