= Jean-François Le Sueur =

French composer (1760–1837)

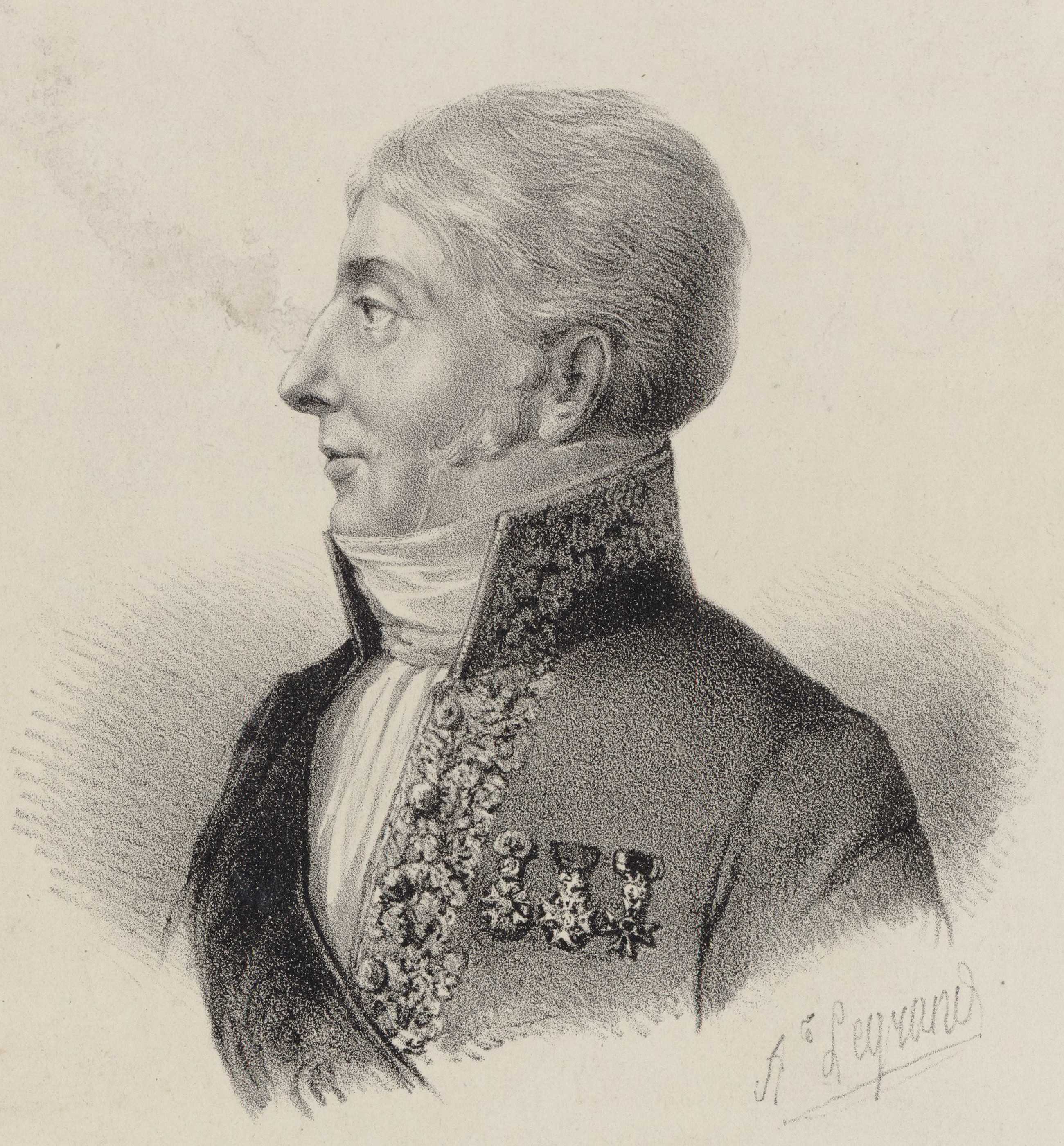
- Born: 15 February 1760; Drucat, France
- Died: 6 October 1837 (aged 77); Paris, France
- Occupation: composer
- Known for: Ossian ou Les bardes

Jean-François Le Sueur (more commonly Lesueur; French: [ʒɑ̃ fʁɑ̃swa lə sɥœʁ]; 15 February 1760 – 6 October 1837) was a French composer, best known for his oratorios and operas.

== Life ==
He was born at Plessiel, a hamlet of Drucat near Abbeville, to a long-established family of Picardy, the great-nephew of the painter Eustache Le Sueur. Beginning as a chorister at the collegial church of Abbeville, then at the cathedral of Amiens, where he pursued his music studies, Le Sueur was named chorus master at the cathedral of Sées. He went to Paris to study harmony with the Abbé Nicolas Roze, chorus master at the Saints-Innocents. Le Sueur was named to positions at Dijon (1779), Le Mans (1782), then at Tours (1783) before he succeeded Roze at the Saints-Innocents at Paris. Finally, in 1786, after a competition, he was made music director at Notre-Dame de Paris.

For the Feast of the Assumption, he innovated by introducing an orchestra, with great success, and his sacred concerts at the main feasts of the Church filled the cathedral to overflowing but incurred resistance in ecclesiastical circles. He replied by publishing a pamphlet Exposé d'une musique imitative et particulière à chaque solennité (1787). The cathedral chapter decided to reduce its musical budget in a time of financial crisis for France, which constrained Le Sueur to give up the important musical Masses that he specialised in, and to give up his position.

He spent some time in London, 1788–92, then returned to revolutionary Paris and gave three successful operas at the Théâtre Feydeau: La Caverne, ou le Repentir (1793), Paul et Virginie, ou le Triomphe de la vertu (1794), which was inspired by the hugely popular novel by Jacques-Henri Bernardin de Saint-Pierre, and the classical Télémaque dans l'île de Calypso, ou le Triomphe de la sagesse (1796).

He was named professor at the École de la Garde Nationale, 21 November 1793, then named Inspecteur at the newly founded Conservatoire. In the company of Étienne Nicolas Méhul, Honoré Langlé, François-Joseph Gossec and Charles Simon Catel, he was limited to teaching elementary principles and solfège. Unable to get his operas Ossian, ou Les bardes and La mort d'Adam mounted at the Paris Opéra, Le Sueur published a violent pamphlet, Projet d'un plan général de l'instruction musicale en France, attacking the Conservatoire, its methods and its director, and was discharged, 23 September 1802.

Without official appointments, Le Sueur was reduced to poverty when in 1804, Napoleon named him maître de la chapelle at the Tuileries, to replace Giovanni Paisiello. Now he was able to mount his most famous work, Ossian ou Les bardes, with great success at the Opéra and with the Emperor, who made the composer of his favorite opera a Chevalier de la Légion d'honneur. Le Sueur composed the Triumphal March for the coronation of Napoleon, directed a Mass by Paisiello and a Vivat by his former master abbé Roze. In 1813, he was named to the Académie des Beaux-Arts, replacing André Grétry.

At the Restoration, he was named composer of the royal chapel and conductor of the orchestra of the Opéra. From the beginning of 1818, he taught composition at the Conservatoire, where over the years he had for pupils Hector Berlioz, Ambroise Thomas, Charles Gounod, Louis Désiré Besozzi and Antoine François Marmontel.

He died on 6 October 1837 in Paris.

== Works ==
=== Oratorios ===
- Ruth et Noëmi (written by 1811)
- Ruth et Booz (written by 1811)
- Debbora
- Rachel
- Oratorio de Noël (Christmas Oratorio)
- Three Passion oratorios
- Coronation oratorios

=== Operas ===
Completion	Title	Length	Première	Libretto
1793	La caverne	3 acts	16 February 1793, Paris, Théâtre Feydeau	Paul Dercy, after Alain-René Lesage's Gil Blas
1794	Paul et Virginie ou Le Triomphe de la vertu	3 acts	13 January 1794, Paris, Théâtre Feydeau	Alphonse du Congé Dubreuil, after the novel by Jacques-Henri Bernardin de Saint-Pierre
1796	Télémaque dans l'île de Calypso ou Le triomphe de la sagesse	3 acts	11 May 1796, Paris, Théâtre Feydeau	Paul Dercy
1804	Ossian, ou Les bardes	5 acts	10 July 1804, Paris, Opéra	Paul Dercy and Jacques-Marie Deschamps
1807	L'inauguration du temple de la victoire	1 act	2 January 1807, Paris, Opéra	Pierre Baour-Lormian
1807	Le triomphe de Trajan [Mostly the work of Persuis]	3 acts	23 October 1807, Paris, Opéra	Joseph-Alphonse Esménard
1809	La mort d'Adam et son apothéose	3 acts	21 March 1809, Paris, Opéra	Nicolas-François Guillard after Friedrich Gottlieb Klopstock
composed 1814-1825	Alexandre à Babylone	3 acts	unperformed	Pierre Baour-Lormian

== Sources ==
- Howard E. Smither A History of the Oratorio, Volume 3: The Oratorio in the Classical Era (University of North Carolina Press, 1977)
- Raoul Rochette., Les Ouvrages de M. Lesueur (Paris. 1839).
