= Jean-Baptiste Rey =

French conductor and composer

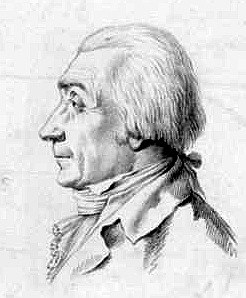
- Jean-Baptiste Rey after Pierre-Narcisse Guérin
- Born: 18 December 1734
- Died: 15 July 1810 (aged 75)

Jean-Baptiste Rey (18 December 1734 – 15 July 1810) was a French conductor and composer.

Rey was born at Lauzerte. He remains the longest-serving conductor of the Paris Opera; his tenure spans from the last years of the monarchy to Napoleon's Empire (1776–1810). As such, he conducted most performances of masterpieces by Gluck, Piccini, Sacchini, Salieri, Gretry, Méhul, Haydn, Mozart, Spontini, etc., many of whom he cooperated with closely. He was the author of an opera, Apollon et Coronis (1781) and several other pieces and arrangements. Rey also wrote the third act of Sacchini's Arvire et Évélina (1788).

Before his nomination at the Academie royale, Rey gained fame as a conductor in the theatres of Toulouse, Montpellier, Marseille, Bordeaux and Nantes. He was called to Paris in 1776 to assist the then first conductor, Louis-Joseph Francœur, whom he replaced in 1781. In 1779, he was named Maître de musique of Louis XVI's royal chamber. In 1781, Apollon et Coronis, the opera he composed with his brother, the cellist Louis-Charles-Joseph Rey, was performed. He kept his position at the Opera throughout the Revolution and participated in a number of revolutionary ceremonies. In 1799, he entered the recently established Conservatoire to teach harmony. He composed some of the Conservatoire's solfeges but was soon expelled along with the composer Jean-Francois Le Sueur, following internal dissensions. In 1803, both Le Sueur and Rey were called by Napoleon to join his chapel: Le Sueur replaced Paisiello as director, while Rey was named first conductor, with Persuis as his assistant. On 2 December 1804, Rey and Persuis conducted two giant orchestras in Notre-Dame for Napoleon's imperial coronation. He died in Paris.
