= Louis-Armand Chardin =

French opera singer

Louis-Armand Chardin, called Chardiny (1755 – 1 October 1793) was an 18th-century French composer.

== Biography ==
Born in Fécamp, Chardin made his debut at the Paris opera in 1780 as baritone and was finally received the following year. He stood out for the beauty of his voice and the purity of his singing. Nevertheless, he acted coldly and never knew how to enliven the stage. The role which made him most honoured was that of Theseus in Œdipe à Colone.

Chardin was a composer, and we know of him several small operas that he wrote for the Théâtre Beaujolais, such as: le Pouvoir de la nature, in one act, 1786; la Ruse d’amour, in one act, 1786; le Clavecin, 1787; Clitandre et Céphise, 1788. In 1787 he had l’Anneau perdu et retrouvé performed at the Comédie-Italienne. He is also known for the music of a melodrama entitled: Annette et Basile.

Chardin was one of the first to set music to Florian's romances Estelle and Galatée. His oratorio Retour de Tobie was given at the Concert spirituel the same year. Chardin wrote the recitatives of Paisiello's Le Roi Théodore à Venise, when this work, translated by Moline, was performed at the Opera on 11 September 1787.

It is also necessary to add to the list of his dramatic productions l'Amant sculpteur, opéra comique in one act which was performed at the Théâtre-comique et lyrique in 1790. When in 1792, Piis and Barré established the Théâtre du Vaudeville, they hired Chardin as a "teacher" of their young artists, and as a composer and arranger of the music for their plays.

Few people, wrote the editor of the Almanach des Spectacles, were in a better condition than this artist to work for this show: the vaudeville was his favorite genre, and he was made to enrich his theatre with a multitude of tunes, which the authors have put everywhere, and which are in everyone's mouth.

This job did not prevent Chardin from continuing to be part of the Opera staff, but it did give him the ability to place a relative, perhaps his brother, J. Chardin, in the orchestra of Vaudeville, where he played the cello parts.

Having warmly embraced the party of the Revolution, Chardin was captain of an armed company of the section de Marat when he died at age thirty-seven.

Five days after his death, the vaudevillist Piis sent these verses about Chardin to the Journal des Spectacles :

Opera loses a good artist,
Music, a good harmonist,
Vaudeville a good supporter,
The god Comus a good guest;
But what causes everyone a more severe pain,
The Republic, in him, loses a good citizen.

== Sources ==
- François-Joseph Fétis, Biographie universelle des musiciens, Paris, Firmin-Didot, 1881, (p. 170).
