= Étienne Lainez =

French operatic tenor

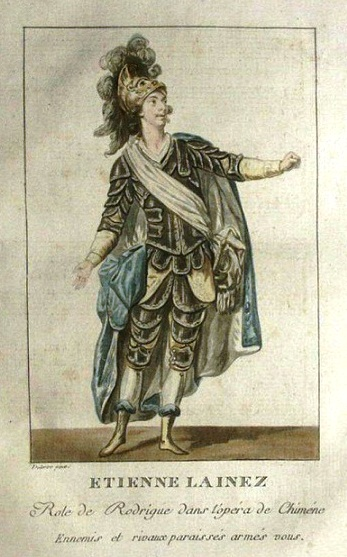
Lainez as Rodrigue in Sacchini's Chimène (1783)

Étienne Lainez (or Lainé, Laînez) (23 May 1753 – 15 September 1822) was a French operatic tenor, and leading figure at the Paris Opera for over thirty years. In the course of his career there he created many tenor roles including Rodrigue in Sacchini's Chimène, Énée in Piccinni's Didon, Narcisse in Gluck's Echo et Narcisse, and Licinius in Spontini's La vestale.

Lainez was born in Vaugirard in Paris, and died in Paris as well.

After his retirement from the stage, he taught lyric declamation at the Paris Conservatoire.
