= List of operas by François-Adrien Boieldieu =

This is a list of operas by François-Adrien Boieldieu (1775–1834). All premieres took place in Paris unless otherwise indicated.

== List ==
Title	Genre	Subdivisions	Libretto	Première date	Place, theatre
La fille coupable	opéra comique	2 acts	Jacques-François-Adrien Boieldieu (father)	2 November 1793	Rouen, Théâtre des Arts
Rosalie et Myrza	opéra comique	3 acts	Jacques-François-Adrien Boieldieu	28 October 1795	Rouen, Théâtre des Arts
La famille suisse	opéra comique	1 act	Claude Godard d'Aucort de Saint-Just	11 February 1797	Théâtre Feydeau
L'heureuse nouvelle	opéra comique	1 act	Claude Godard d'Aucort de Saint-Just and Charles de Longchamps	7 November 1797	Théâtre Feydeau
Le pari, ou Mombreuil et Merville	opéra comique	1 act	Charles de Longchamps	15 December 1797	Opéra-Comique, Salle Favart
Zoraïme et Zulnar	opéra comique	3 acts	Claude Godard d'Aucort de Saint Just	10 May 1798	Opéra-Comique, Salle Favart
La dot de Suzette	opéra comique	1 act	Dejaure (Jean-Élie Bédéno Dejaure)	5 September 1798	Opéra-Comique, Salle Favart
Les méprises espagnoles	opéra comique	1 act	Claude Godard d'Aucort de Saint-Just	18 April 1799	Théâtre Feydeau
Emma ou La prisonnière (together with Luigi Cherubini)	opéra comique	1 act	Victor-Joseph Étienne de Jouy, Claude Godard d'Aucort de Saint-Just and Charles de Longchamps	12 September 1799	Théâtre Montansier
Béniowski, ou Les exilés du Kamchattka	opéra comique	3 acts	Alexandre-Vincent Pineux Duval, after August von Kotzebue	8 June 1800, second version: 20 July 1824	Opéra-Comique, Salle Favart; second version: Opéra-Comique, Salle Feydeau
Le calife de Bagdad	opéra comique	1 act	Claude Godard d'Aucort de Saint-Just, after One Thousand and One Nights	16 September 1800	Opéra-Comique, Salle Favart
Ma tante Aurore, ou Le roman impromptu	opéra comique	3 acts	Charles de Longchamps	13 January 1803	Opéra-Comique, Salle Feydeau
Le baiser et la quittance, ou Une aventure de garnison (together with Nicolas Isouard, Louis-Benoît Picard, Joseph-Marie-Armand-Michel Dieulafoy and Étienne Nicolas Méhul)	opéra comique	3 acts	Charles de Longchamps	18 June 1803	Opéra-Comique, Salle Feydeau
Aline, reine de Golconde	opéra comique	3 acts	Jean-Baptiste-Charles Vial and Edmond-Guillaume-François de Favières, after Michel-Jean Sedaine	17 March 1804	Saint Petersburg, Hermitage Theater
La jeune femme colère	opéra comique	1 act	Michel Marie Claparède, after Charles-Guillaume Étienne	30 April 1805	Saint Petersburg,
Abderkan	opéra comique	1 act	Dégligny	26 July (7 August) 1805	Saint Petersburg, Peterhof Palace
Un tour de soubrette	opéra comique	1 act	Nicolas Gersin	28 April 1806	Saint Petersburg
Télémaque	opéra comique	3 acts	Alphonse François "Paul" Palat-Dercy	28 December 1806	Saint Petersburg
Amour et mystère, ou Lequel est mon cousin?	opéra comique	1 act	Joseph Pain	1807	Saint Petersburg
Les voitures versées	opéra comique	2 acts	Emanuel Mercier-Dupaty	18 April 1808, second version: 29 April 1820	Saint Petersburg, Hermitage Theater; second version: Opéra-Comique, Salle Feydeau
Rien de trop, ou Les deux paravents	opéra comique	1 act	Joseph Pain	25 December 1810 / 6 January 1811	Saint Petersburg, Hermitage Theater
Jean de Paris	opéra comique	2 acts	Claude Godard d'Aucort de Saint-Just	4 April 1812	Opéra-Comique, Salle Feydeau
Le nouveau seigneur de village	opéra comique	1 act	Auguste-François Creuzé de Lesser and Edmond-Guillaume-François de Favières	29 June 1813	Opéra-Comique, Salle Feydeau
Bayard à Mézières, ou Le siège de Mézières (together with Charles Simon Catel, Luigi Cherubini and Nicolas Isouard)	opéra comique	1 act	René Allisan de Chazet and Emanuel Mercier-Dupaty	12 February 1814	Opéra-Comique, Salle Feydeau
Le Béarnais, ou Henri IV en voyage	opéra comique	1 act	Charles-Augustin Sewrin	21 May 1814	Opéra-Comique, Salle Feydeau
Angéla, ou L'atelier de Jean Cousin (together with Sophie Gail)	opéra comique	1 act	Georges de Montcloux d'Épinay	13 June 1814	Opéra-Comique, Salle Feydeau
La fête du village voisin	opéra comique	3 acts	Charles-Augustin Sewrin	5 March 1816	Opéra-Comique, Salle Feydeau
Charles de France, ou Amour et gloire (together with Ferdinand Hérold)	opéra comique	2 acts	Emmanuel Théaulon, Armand Dartois and Armand Jean Le Bouthillier de Rancé	18 June 1816	Opéra-Comique, Salle Feydeau
Le petit chaperon de rouge	opéra comique	3 acts	Emmanuel Théaulon	30 June 1818	Opéra-Comique, Salle Feydeau
Blanche de Provence, ou La cour des fées (together with Henri Montan Berton and Rodolphe Kreutzer)	opéra	3 acts	Emmanuel Théaulon after Armand Jean Le Bouthillier de Rancé	1 May 1821	Tuiléries
Les arts rivaux	scène lyrique	1 act	René Allisan de Chazet	2 May 1821	Hôtel de Ville
La France et l'Espagne	scène lyrique	1 act	René Allisan de Chazet	15 December 1823	Hôtel de Ville
Les trois genres (together with Daniel Auber)	scène lyrique	1 act	Eugène Scribe, Emanuel Mercier-Dupaty and Michel Pichat	27 April 1824	Théâtre de l'Odéon
Pharamond	opéra	3 acts	Jacques-François Ancelot, Alexandre Guiraud and Alexandre Soumet	10 June 1825	Opéra, Salle Le Peletier
La dame blanche	opéra comique	3 acts	Eugène Scribe, after Guy Mannering, The Monastery, etc. by Sir Walter Scott	10 December 1825	Opéra-Comique, Salle Feydeau
Les deux nuits	opéra comique	3 acts	Jean-Nicolas Bouilly and Eugène Scribe	20 May 1829	Opéra-Comique, Salle Ventadour
Marguerite (completed by Adrien-Louis-Victor Boieldieu)	opéra comique	3 acts	Eugène Scribe	18 June 1838	Opéra-Comique, Salle Ventadour
La marquise de Brinvilliers (together with Daniel Auber, Désiré-Alexandre Batton, Henri Montan Berton, Felice Blangini, Michele Carafa, Luigi Cherubini, Ferdinand Hérold and Ferdinando Paer)	drame lyrique	3 acts	Castil-Blaze and Eugène Scribe	31 October 1831	Opéra-Comique, Salle Ventadour

== See also ==
- List of compositions by François-Adrien Boieldieu
