= Antoinette Lemonnier =

French operatic soprano (1787–1866)

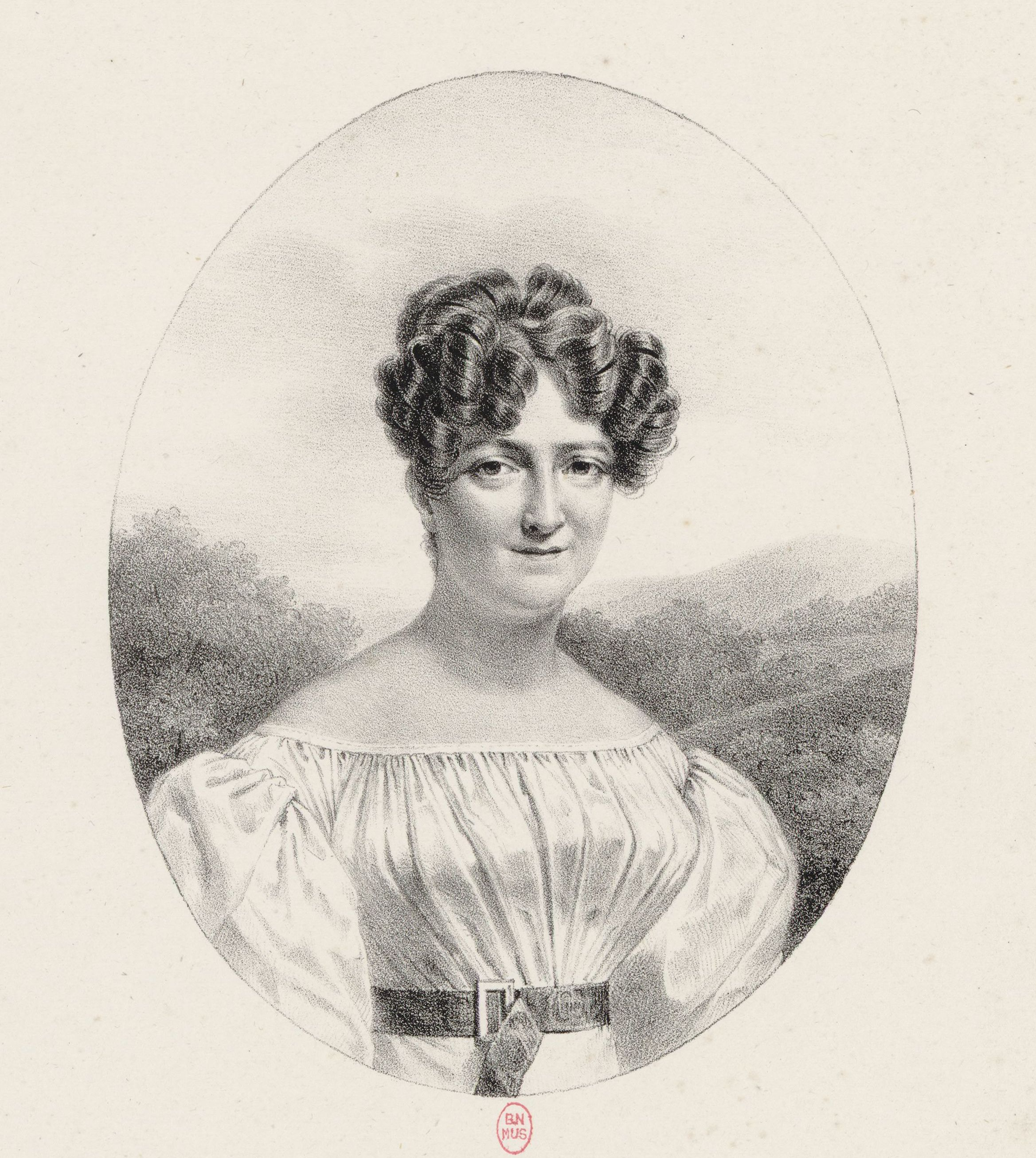
Madame Lemonnier, 1820

Thérèse Louise Antoinette Regnault, known under the name Antoinette Lemonnier, (23 August 1787 – 4 April 1866) was a French opera singer, member of the Opéra-Comique.

== Life ==
Born in Brest, Regnault is the daughter of Jacques Louis Regnault, actor, master writer, and Geneviève Elisabeth Marchand.

Her singing teacher was Roland, baryton-martin of the Théâtre des Arts de Rouen. She made her debut, at the age of sixteen, at the first theatre of Rouen, in le Prisonnier and Maison à vendre, and stayed four years in that city. An order from the superintendent of the theatres made her come to Paris to debut at the Opéra-Comique. She made her debut on 16 December 1808, in Le jugement de Midas and Isabelle et Gertrude. Elle continue dans La Belle Arsène, La Colonie, Le Diable à Quatre, Sylvain, Une folie, La Fausse Magie, Montano et Stéphanie, Les Maris Garçons, Maison à vendre, L'Amour filiale, Les Visitandines, Le Calife de Bagdad and Euphrosine et Coradin.

Her rivalry with Cécile Duret-Saint-Aubin is due to the fact that Boieldieu wrote mostly for her and Nicolas Isouard mostly for Mme Duret.

She had a son with Boieldieu, Adrien Louis Victor Boïeldieu (1815–1883), a composer.

In 1817, she married Augustin Lemonnier, a tenor at the Opéra-Comique.

In 1823, she performed at La Monnaie.

She wants to leave th Opéra-Comique, broke up for the first time in 1829 and retired in 1831. Her benefit performance took place in 1832, salle Ventadour.

Lemonnier died in Saint-Sever-Calvados aged 78.

== Creations ==
At the Opéra-Comique

- 1810 : Cendrillon, Opéra féerie in 3 acts by Nicolas Isouard, libretto by Charles-Guillaume Étienne, 22 February, as Tisbé.
- 1811: Le Charme de la voix, 24 January, as Lisette.
- 1811: L'enfant prodigue by Pierre Gaveaux; 23 November, as Jephtèle.
- 1811: La jeune femme en colère by Boieldieu, as Rose de Vomar.
- 1812: Jean de Paris (Boieldieu), two acts opéra comique by Boieldieu after a libretto by Claude Godard d'Aucourt de Saint-Just, 4 April, as the Princess of Navarre.
- 1813: Le Nouveau Seigneur de village, 29 June, as Babet.
- 1813: Valentin ou le Paysan romanesque by Henri-Montan Berton; 3 September, as Marie.
- 1814: Les Héritiers Michau by Nicolas-Charles Bochsa; 30 April, as Suzette.
- 1815: Les Noces de Gamache, opéra comique de Bochsa, as Quitterie, 16 September.
- 1815: La Sourde-muette by Blangini, 26 July.
- 1816: La Fête du village voisin by Boieldieu, opéra comique in three acts, libretto by Sewrin, as Madame de Ligneul.
- 1816: Charles de France ou Amour et gloire, opéra-comique by Boieldieu and Hérold, part of Marguerite de Sicile.
- 1817: La clochette ou le diable page by Ferdinand Hérold, part of Palmire.
- 1818: La Fenêtre secrète by Désiré-Alexandre Batton, 17 November, as Mme de Florville
- 1819: Les Rivaux de village ou La Cruche cassée, 24 December, as Rose.
- 1820: Les voitures versées by Boieldieu, 29 April, as Madame Melval.
- 1821: Jeanne d’Arc ou la Délivrance d’Orléans by Michele Enrico Carafa, 10 March
- 1823: Leicester ou le Château de Kenilworth, part of Elisabeth, 25 January.
- 1826: Le timide ou Le Nouveau Séducteur, by Esprit Auber, 30 May, part of travestite Valmont.
- 1827: Les Petits appartements by Henri-Montan Berton; 9 July, as La Baronne.
- 1829: La Fiancée by Esprit Auber, 10 January, as Mrs Charlotte
- 1830: Danilowa, 23 April. as Sélomir.
- 1830: Joséphine ou le Retour de Wagram by Adolphe Adam, 2 December, as Joséphine.

== Related article ==
François-Adrien Boieldieu
