= Alexandrine Saint-Aubin =

French operatic soprano (1793–1867)

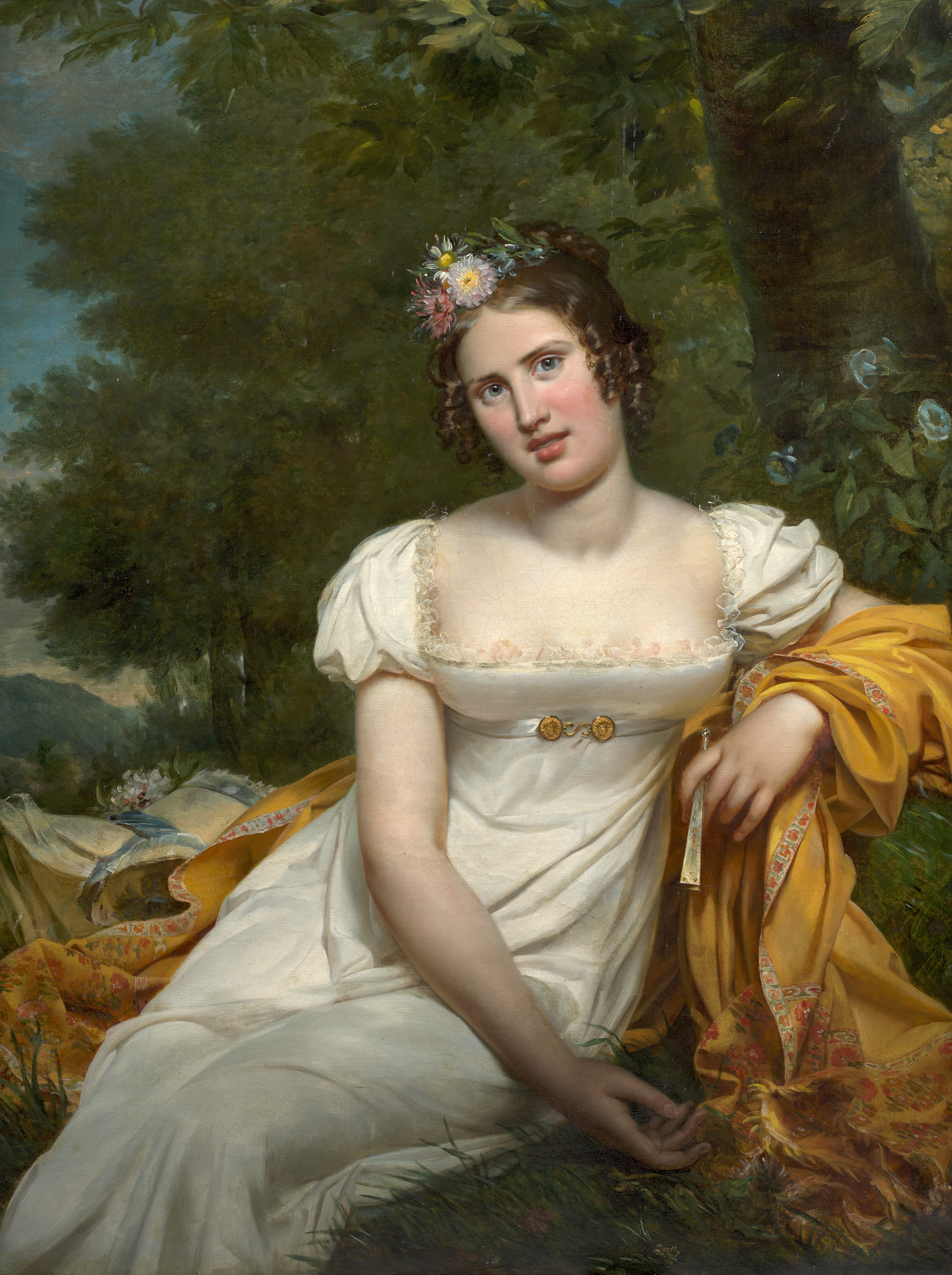
Portrait of Alexandrine Saint-Aubin, by Jean-Baptiste Paulin Guérin, circa 1819

Anne-Alexandrine d'Herbez, known under the name Alexandrine Saint-Aubin, (9 April 1793 - 30 March 1867), was a French operatic soprano.

== Life ==
Born in Paris, Saint-Aubin was the daughter of Augustin-Alexandre d'Herbez, known as "Saint-Aubin", tenor of the Opéra de Paris and Jeanne-Charlotte Schroeder, Madame Saint-Aubin, soprano at the Comédie-Italienne and at the Opéra-Comique. She is the younger sister of Cécile Duret-Saint-Aubin.

She made a fleeting appearance at her mother's side in Le Prisonnier by Della-Maria. She made her real debut on November 3, 1809, at the Theatre Favard, in two of the roles that had earned her mother the most brilliant success, the ingenue of l'Opéra-Comique and the soubrette by Ambroise ou Voilà ma journée. In 1810, she plays the title role in Cendrillon by Nicolas Isouard, seventy-eight performances in less than a year, one hundred in total, which is rare at the Opéra-Comique, at the time.

In 1812, she married Joly, the singer of vaudevilles. She left the stage prematurely in 1817.

Widowed in 1839, she remarried in 1840 to Alexandre Houdaille, wood merchant in Nevers.

Saint-Aubin died in Saint-Saulge at the age of 73.

== Premieres ==
- 1810 : Cendrillon, 3 acts Opéra-féerie by Nicolas Isouard, libretto by Charles-Guillaume Étienne, 22 February, in the title role.
- 1811 : La Victime des arts, 27 February
- 1812 : Jean de Paris, opera comique in 2 acts, music by François-Adrien Boieldieu after a libretto by Claude Godard d'Aucourt de Saint-Just, premiered at the Opéra-Comique (Théâtre Feydeau) 4 April, part of Lorezza.
- 1812 : Les Rivaux d'un moment,.
- 1812 : Lulli et Quinault, ou le Déjeuner impossible, 27 February, part of Laurette.
- 1814 : Les Béarnais, ou Henri IV en voyage, 21 May
- 1817 : Les Rosières, rôle de Cateau.

=== Further reading ===
- A series of articles by Arthur Pougin published in Le Ménestrel.
  - "Une famille d'artistes, les Saint-Aubin (V) suite », in Le Ménestrel »". Gallica (in French). 1891-02-22..
  - "Une famille d'artistes, les Saint-Aubin (V) suite », in Le Ménestrel »". Gallica (in French). 1891-03-01..
  - "Une famille d'artistes, les Saint-Aubin (VII) », in Le Ménestrel »". Gallica (in French). 1891-03-08..
  - "Une famille d'artistes, les Saint-Aubin (VIII) », in Le Ménestrel »". Gallica (in French). 1891-03-15..
  - "Une famille d'artistes, les Saint-Aubin (VIII) suite et fin », in Le Ménestrel »". Gallica (in French). 1891-03-22..

=== Related article ===
- Jeanne-Charlotte Schroeder
- Cécile Duret-Saint-Aubin
