= Cécile Duret-Saint-Aubin =

French operatic soprano (1785–1862)

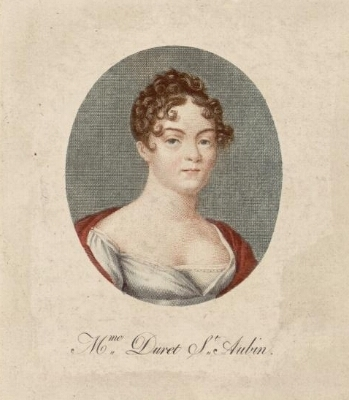
Madame Duret Saint-Aubin

Anne, Marie, Antoinette, Cécile d'Herbez, known under the name Cécile Saint-Aubin and also Cécile Duret-Saint-Aubin (French: [sesil dyʁɛ sɛ̃t obɛ̃]; 14 October 1785 – 30 November 1862), was a French operatic soprano.

== Life ==
Born in Paris, she was the daughter of Augustin-Alexandre d'Herbez, called Saint-Aubin, tenor de l'Opéra de Paris and Jeanne-Charlotte Schroeder, Madame Saint-Aubin, soprano at the Comédie-Italienne and the Opéra-Comique. She was the elder sister of Alexandrine Saint-Aubin (1793–1867).

She took lessons for three years from the composer Angelo Tarchi and enters the Conservatoire de Paris to perfect his skills in the class of Pierre-Jean Garat She left to debut at the Opéra Comique 24 May 1804 in Le Concert interrompu, by Berton, where she gets a success. She plays with her mother in Michel-Ange, by Nicolas Isouard, then shows herself in Montano et Stéphanie, by Berton. After four or five months of stay at the Opéra-Comique, she suddenly leaves this theater only to return after an absence of about four years. She returned to the Conservatoire. On 24 September 1804, she married the violinist Marcel Duret.

On 4 and 7 April 1808, she played Montano and Stéphanie, on 9 April Le Concert interrompu, and continued with a series of performances of these two works, after which she created the role of Florina in Nicolo's Cimarosa, then took on the role of Zémire in Zémire et Azor.

She was accepted as a member of the Society in 1811. Isouard wrote especially for her the leading roles in Lully et Quinault, Le Billet de loterie, Jeannot et Colin, and Le Magicien sans magie. She was the rival of Antoinette Lemonnier, due to the fact that Boieldieu wrote mainly for Madame Lemonnier, Isouard mainly for her.

For health reasons, she was forced to retire in 1820.

Duret-Saint-Aubin died in the 9th arrondissement of Paris aged 77, and was buried at the Père Lachaise Cemetery.

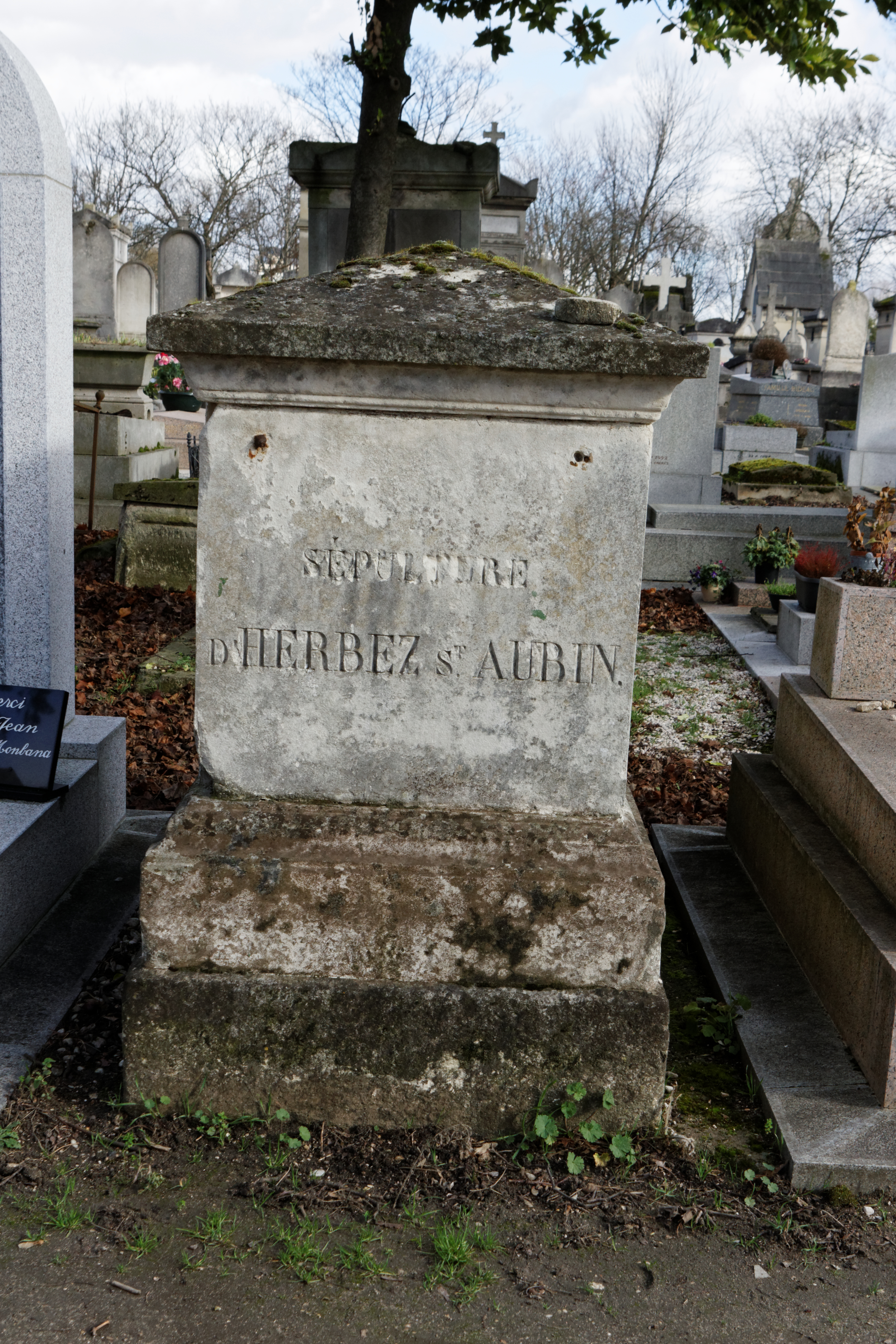
Grave of Herbez Saint-Aubin at Père Lachaise Cemetery

== Premieres ==
At the Opéra-Comique

- 1808: Cimarosa, opéra-comique by Nicolas Isouard, 28 June, part of Florina.
- 1809: La Dupe de son art
- 1809: Zélomir ou L'Intrigue au sérail, part of Zélime, 25 April.
- 1810: Cendrillon, 3 acts opéra-féerie by Nicolas Isouard, libretto by Charles-Guillaume Étienne, 22 February, part of Clorinde.
- 1811: Le Billet de Loterie, 14 September, part of Adèle.
- 1811: Le Magicien sans magie, part of Hortense.
- 1811: Rien de trop ou Les deux paravents, part of Evelina.
- 1811: Le Charme de la voix, by Charles Nanteuil, 24 January.
- 1811: La Victime des arts, 27 February
- 1812: L'Homme sans façon, ou les Contrariétés
- 1812: Lulli et Quinault, ou le Déjeuner impossible, 27 February.
- 1812: Les Aubergistes de qualité, part of Émilie.
- 1814: Jeannot et Colin, 17 October, part of Thérèse.
- 1816: Les Deux Maris, part of Clémence.

== Related article ==
- Jeanne-Charlotte Schroeder
