= List of compositions by François-Adrien Boieldieu =

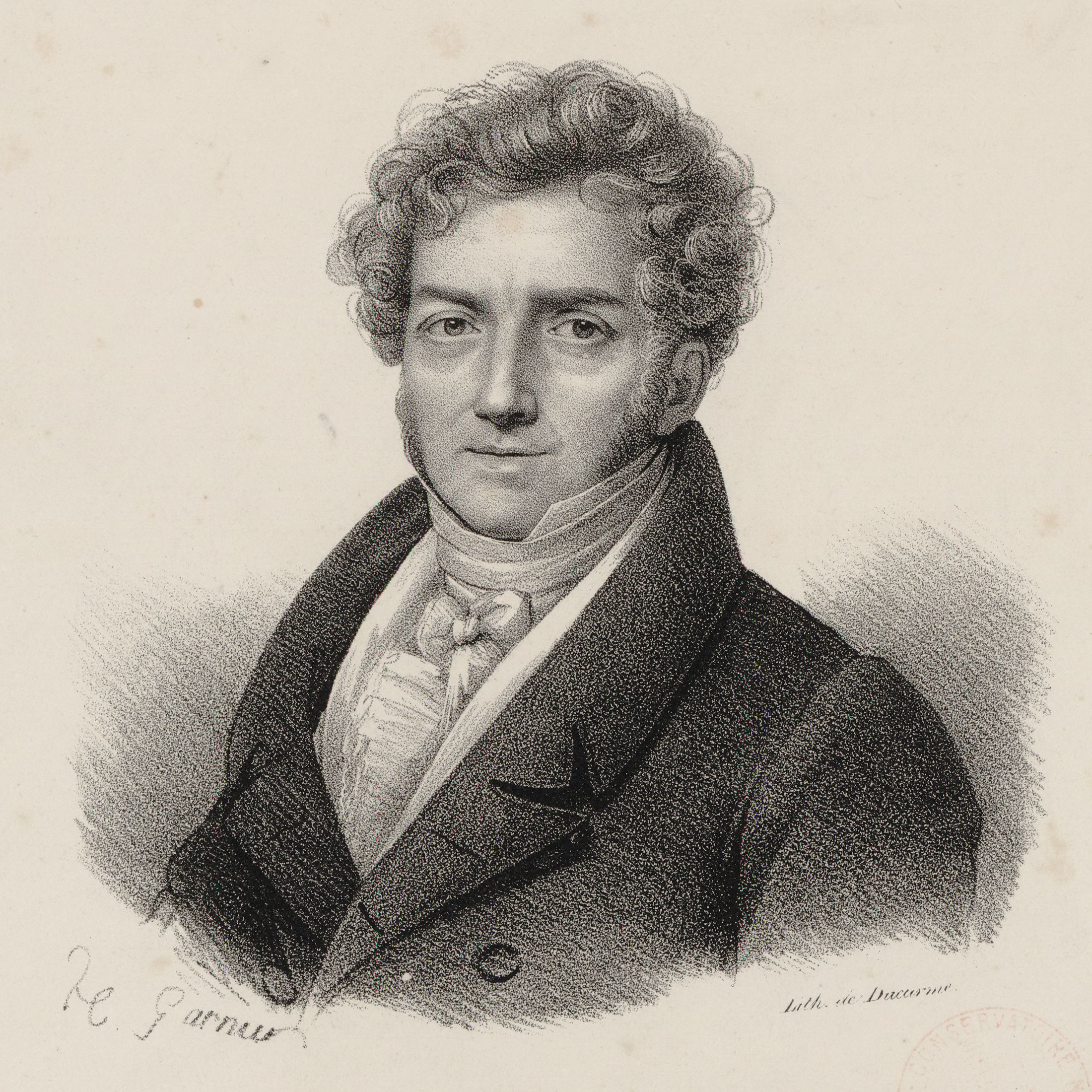
François-Adrien Boieldieu, etching after Henri-François Riesener, Bibliothèque nationale de France.

This is a list of compositions by François-Adrien Boieldieu.

== Operas ==
- La Fille coupable (1793)
- Rosalie et Myrza (1795)
- La Famille suisse (1797)
- L'Heureuse Nouvelle (1797)
- Le Pari, ou Mombreuil et Merville (1797)
- Zoraïme et Zulnar (1798)
- La Dot de Suzette (1798)
- Les Méprises espagnoles (1799)
- Emma ou la Prisonnière (1799) with Luigi Cherubini
- Béniovski ou les Exilés du Kamchattka (1800)
- Le Calife de Bagdad (1800)
- Ma tante Aurore ou le Roman impromptu (1803)
- Le Baiser et la Quittance ou Une aventure de garnison (1803)
- Aline, reine de Golconde (1804)
- La Jeune Femme colère (1805)
- Abderkan (1805)
- Un tour de soubrette (1806)
- Télémaque (1806)
- Amour et mystère ou Lequel est mon cousin ? (1807)
- La Dame invisible (1808)
- L'Athalie (1808)
- Les voitures versées ou le Séducteur en voyage (1808)
- Rien de trop ou les Deux Paravents (1811)
- Jean de Paris (1812)
- Le Nouveau Seigneur de village (1813)
- Le Béarnais ou Henri IV en voyage (1814)
- Angéla ou l'Atelier de Jean Cousin (1814)
- La Fête du village voisin (1816)
- Charles de France ou Amour et gloire (1816)
- Le Petit Chaperon rouge (1818)
- Les Arts rivaux (1821)
- Blanche de Provence ou la Cour des fées (1821)
- La France et l'Espagne (1823)
- Les Trois Genres (1824) (with Auber)
- Pharamond (1825)
- La dame blanche (1825)
- Les Deux Nuits (1829)
- La Marquise de Brinvilliers (1831), with Auber, Cherubini and others

== Concertos ==
- Concerto pour harpe en ut majeur (1800)
- Concerto for piano in F major (1792)
