= Henri Gui =

French opera singer

Henri Gui (born 1926) was a French baryton-martin singer, particularly associated with the role of Pelléas in the opera by Debussy, who also sang in operetta, mainly in France but elsewhere in Europe and the United States as well.

== Career ==
Gui sang Pelléas under Karajan, and in the same conductor's production, in Vienna in 1962, where one critic described him as “a near-perfect Pelléas - shy and withdrawn, tender in his love and moving in his suffering. He sang very well too.” In May 1962 Gui appeared in the role at Glyndebourne opposite Denise Duval and Michel Roux, with his namesake Vittorio Gui conducting. At the Paris Opéra-Comique Gui sang Marcel in la Bohème in 1962, and Pelléas in the Debussy centenary production of Pelléas et Mélisande in December 1962. He also sang the role at the Aix-en-Provence Festival in 1972. He made his United States debut in November 1969 at the San Francisco War Memorial Opera House again as Pelléas, and the same year he took part in a broadcast recording for Italian Radio in Rome opposite Gabriel Bacquier as Golaud, and with Lorin Maazel conducting his first Pelléas et Mélisande.

Although most noted for the role of Pelléas he sang other French opera and operetta, as well as Mozart: Monostatos at Aix-en-Provence in 1963 under John Pritchard, and Nardo in the French premiere of Mozart's La Finta Giardiniera, in Italian, in Strasbourg in March 1965, "the evening's best success going to Henri Gui, whose Nardo was an enchantment: he has the required light touch, and surely he is an artist for Glyndebourne in other parts than Pelléas". In 1964 he alternated Pelléas with performances of La Fille de Madame Angot in Colmar.

He sang the Secretary in the French premiere of Henze's Der junge Lord in a French translation, produced and designed by Jean-Pierre Ponnelle. He returned to Alsace the following season for Andrea Chenier (in French) singing Fléville and Roucher.

At the 1967 Wexford Festival in Ireland, Gui appeared as a "superbly convincing" Mercutio in Gounod's Roméo et Juliette, and in the following year the Duc de Rothsay in Bizet's La Jolie fille de Perth.

He sang Damien in the premiere of Daniel-Lesur's Andrea del Sarto in Marseille, with Gabriel Bacquier in the title role and Serge Baudo conducting, having taken part in The Mines of Sulphur in the same house the previous year. Back at the Opéra-Comique he sang Orphée in Milhaud's Les Malheurs d'Orphée, described as “a French baryton-martin par excellence”. The same year he was seen in Platée by Rameau at the Théâtre Romain de Fourvière as Cithéron with Michel Sénéchal in the title role.

Operetta performances in the 1970s included La Fille de Madame Angot and La Veuve joyeuse (the French version of The Merry Widow - as Danilo) at the Théâtre municipal de Grenoble in 1972, La Vie parisienne in Nantes in 1975, and La Chauve-souris (the French version of Die Fledermaus) at the Opéra-théâtre d'Avignon in 1977. He appeared as Duparquet in Ciboulette in Orléans-Angers, Théâtre Municipal, in October 1975, and Hérisson de Porc-Epic in Chabrier's L'Étoile in Metz in 1979.

As Henri de Valois with “warm and winning personality”, Gui took part in a complete BBC radio broadcast of Chabrier's Le Roi malgré lui recorded in Manchester in 1973, conducted by Manuel Rosenthal. In 1981 Radio France's <Saison Lyrique> included Sauguet's Le Plumet du colonel with Gui.

He also appeared in the television series Airs de France as Comte Tassilo in La Comtesse Maritza (1959).

== Discography ==
Gui took part in recordings of French language excerpts from Rêve de Valse by Oscar Straus in 1960, Le Pays du Sourire in 1960, and Paillasse (Silvio) conducted by Jésus Etcheverry on the Classiques Pour Tous label. As Figaro he participated in excerpts from the French version of Il barbiere di Siviglia (Le Barbier de Seville) on Polaris/Véga. He was the solo singer in Le Souper - opéra pour un personage by Marius Constant for Philips (Collection Trésors Classiques) with soloists of the ORTF chorus conducted by Marcel Couraud in 1969. Excerpts from Daniel-Lesur's Andrea del Sarto with French radio forces under Rosenthal were issued by Inédits ORTF/Barclay.

He sang Mercutio on the 1969 EMI recording of Roméo et Juliette with the Théâtre National de l'Opéra company conducted by Alain Lombard. There were two Offenbach roles; Landry in La Chanson de Fortunio conducted by Alain Pâris (Bourg BG 2007, 1973) and Bobinet in La Vie parisienne conducted by François Rauber (French Decca 117 011, 1974).

He sang the Grand Sénéchal in the opéra comique Jean de Paris by Boieldieu in 1966, published in 1991 by Gaieté lyrique : Musidisc, and appears on the album 'Les plus beaux chants sacrés' (1959) on the Orphée label.
