= Gabrielle d'Estrées (opera) =

Méhul in 1799 – portrait by Antoine Gros

Gabrielle d’Estrées, ou Les amours d'Henri IV de France (Gabrielle d’Estrées, or The Loves of Henri IV of France) is an opera in three acts by the French composer Étienne Méhul. It premiered at the Opéra-Comique, Paris on 25 June 1806. The libretto is by Claude Godard d'Aucourt de Saint-Just.

The plot concerns the love affair of King Henri IV with Gabrielle d'Estrées. The opera was removed from the repertoire after its sixth performance on 5 July. According to Arthur Pougin, this was due to the weakness of the work, especially its libretto. However, the musicologist Elizabeth Bartlet believes it was suspended for political reasons. In 1805, Napoleon – then ruler of France – had written to his chief of police Joseph Fouché that he did not want to see Henri IV on stage because the king was too close in time "not to arouse passions. The stage needs a little bit of antiquity and, without causing the theatre too much trouble, I think you ought to prevent this [i.e. showing Henri IV on stage], without appearing to intervene." Méhul's nephew Joseph Daussoigne-Méhul planned a revival in 1818 but it never took place.

== Roles ==
Roles, voice types, premiere cast
Role	Voice type	Premiere cast
Henri IV	tenor	Jean Elleviou
D'Estrées, Lord of Cœuvres	baritone	Jean-Pierre Solié
Gabrielle, his daughter	soprano	Jeanne-Charlotte Schroeder ("Madame Saint-Aubin")
Crillon	tenor	Pierre Gaveaux
Eloi, a soldier		Moreau
Estelle, a young girl attached to Gabrielle	soprano	Madame Gavaudan
Chorus: Noblemen and soldiers of Henri IV's army; Ligueurs (members of the Catholic League)

== Sources ==
- Bartlet, M. Elizabeth C. (1997). "General introduction to Méhul's operas". Stratonice. Pendragon Press. ISBN 978-0918728951.
- Place, Adélaïde de (2005). Étienne Nicolas Méhul (in French). Editions Bleu Nuit.
- Pougin, Arthur (1889). Méhul: sa vie, son génie, son caractère (in French). Fischbacher.
