= Cendrillon (Isouard) =

1810 opera by Nicolas Isouard

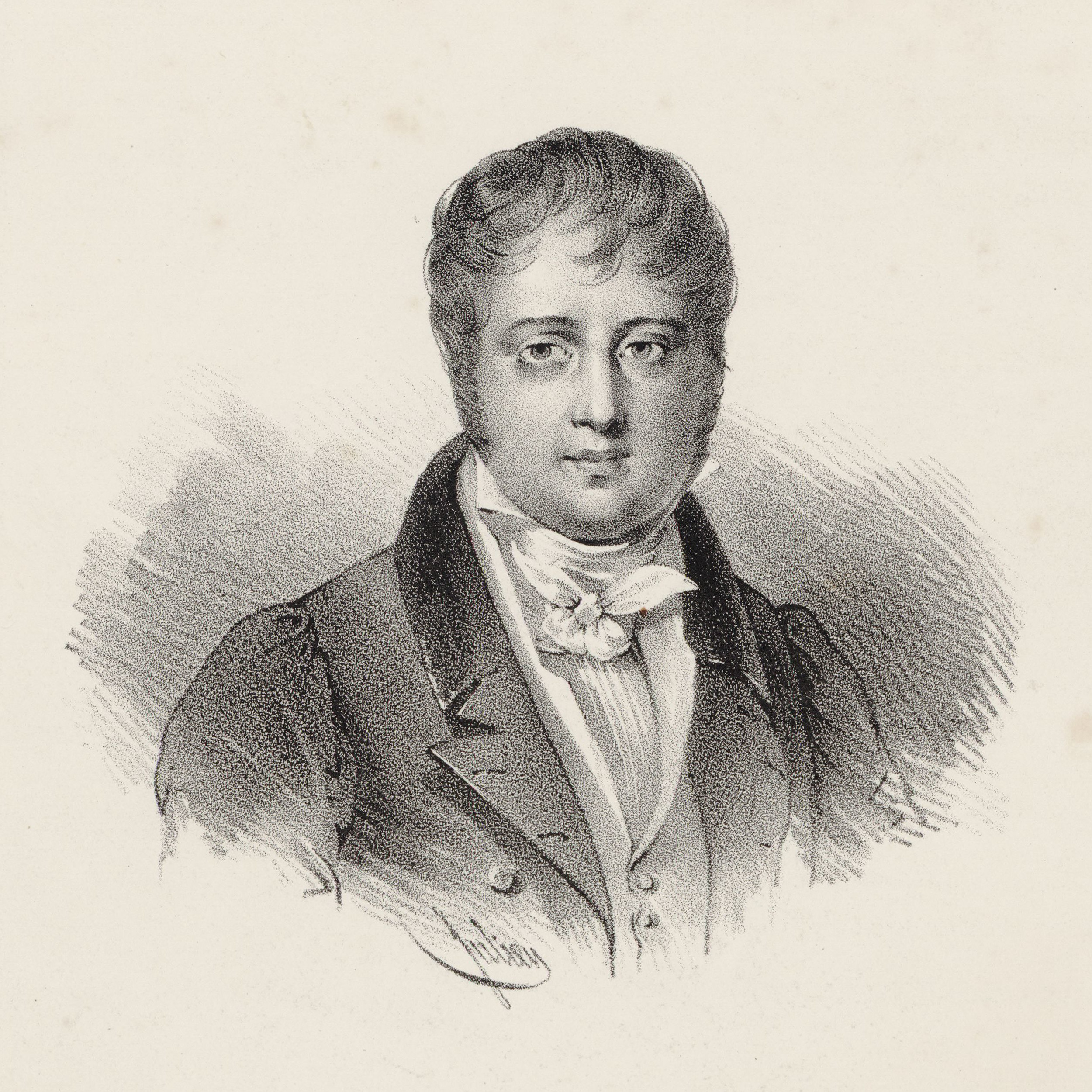
Nicolas Isouard

Cendrillon (French: [sɑ̃dʁijɔ̃]; English: Cinderella) is a French opera in three acts by the Maltese-born composer Nicolas Isouard. It takes the form of an opéra comique with spoken dialogue between the musical numbers, although its authors designated it an opéra féerie. The libretto, by Charles-Guillaume Étienne, is based on Charles Perrault's fairy tale Cinderella. The work was first performed by the Opéra-Comique at the Salle Feydeau in Paris on 22 February 1810. Cendrillon was a success throughout Europe until its popularity was eclipsed by that of Rossini's opera on the Cinderella theme, La Cenerentola (1817).

== Roles ==
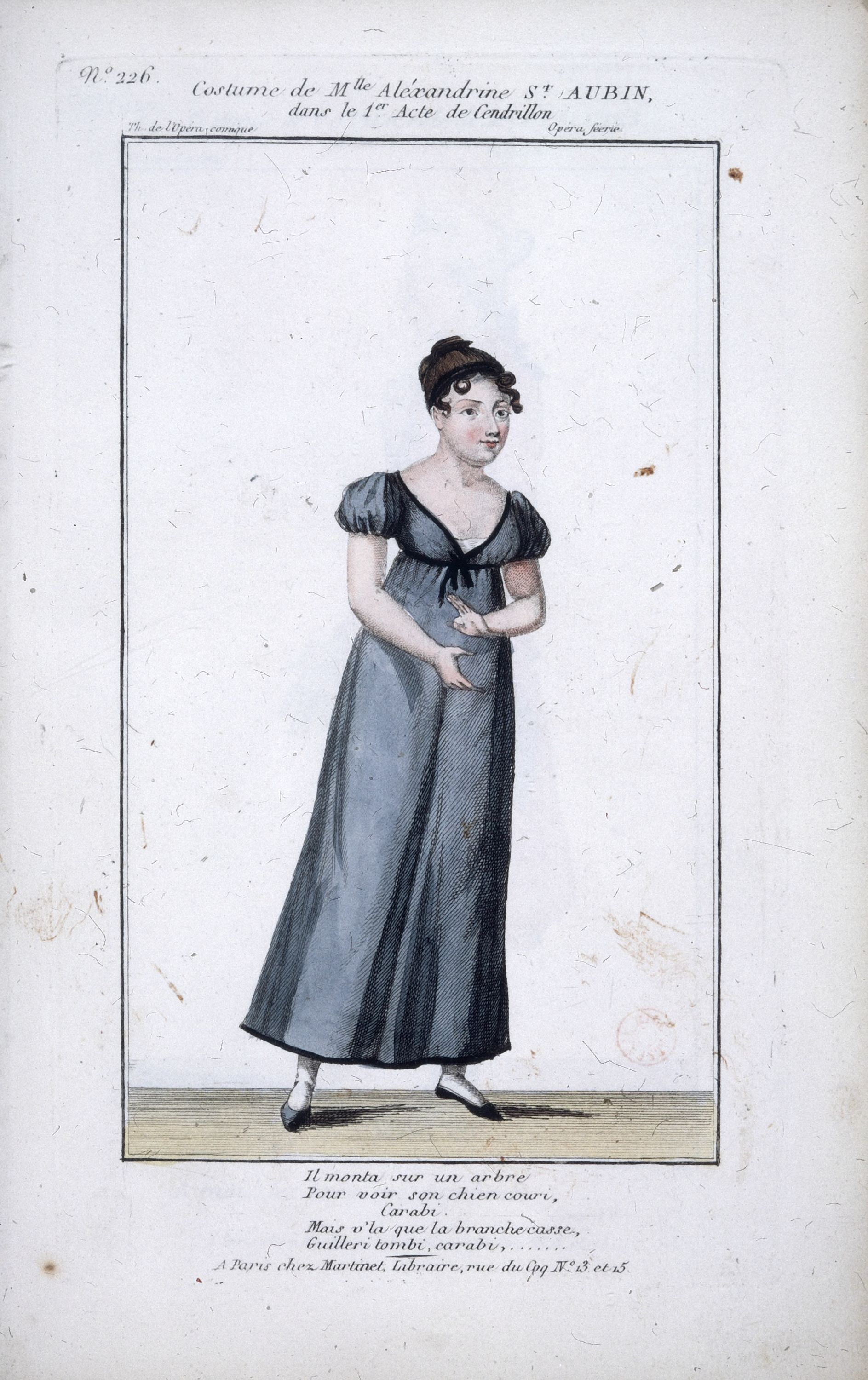
Alexandrine Saint-Aubin as Cendrillon

Roles, voice types, premiere cast
| Role | Voice type | Premiere cast, 22 February 1810 (Conductor: Frédéric Blasius) |
|---|---|---|
| Cendrillon | soprano | Anne-Alexandrine d'Herbez, called Alexandrine Saint-Aubin |
| Clorinde | soprano | Anne-Marie-Antoinette-Cécile d'Herbez, called Mme Duret |
| Tisbé | soprano | Antoinette Lemonnier, called Mme Regnault |
| Prince Ramir | tenor | Paul Dutreck, called M. Paul |
| Dandini | tenor | Paul Lesage |
| Alidor | bass | Jean-Pierre Solié |
| Baron de Montefiascone | bass | Antoine Juillet, called M. Juliet(te) |
Chorus: lords, pages, squires, and ladies of the court

== Synopsis ==
=== Act 1 ===
Cendrillon is the stepdaughter of Baron Montefiascone. She lives in his house with his daughters, Clorinde and Thisbé, where she is treated like a servant. The two sisters are preparing for the royal ball when a beggar arrives asking for hospitality. Cendrillon welcomes him but the sisters drive him away, not realising he is Alidor, the Prince's minister, in disguise. The beggar promises that Cendrillon will be rewarded for her kindness. The Prince has heard rumours of Cendrillon's goodness and he too comes to the house disguised as his valet, Dandini. He learns the true nature of the three stepsisters. Clorinde and Thisbé leave Cendrillon behind as they depart for the ball, but Alidor promises her she will go too.

=== Act 2 ===
Cendrillon wakes up at the Prince's palace to find herself wearing magnificent clothes. Alidor assures her no one will recognise her in this disguise as he gives her a rose. The Prince meets her, still disguised as Dandini. She allows him to be her "knight (chevalier)" in a mock tournament and he wins. When he asks her to be his wife she flees, leaving a slipper behind.

=== Act 3 ===
At the Baron's house, Clorinde and Thisbé discuss the news that the Prince has fallen in love with the beautiful stranger at the ball. The Prince tries to find the owner of the slipper and arrives at the Baron's house. It fits Cendrillon and the Prince offers her his hand in marriage. She gladly accepts.

== Recordings ==
- Cendrillon Ludmilla Shilova, Byung Soon Lee, Marian Sjölander, Nikolai Doroshkin, Hans Pieter Herman, Ensemble XXI Moscow, conducted by Richard Bonynge (Olympia, 1999)
