= L'heureux malgré lui =

Méhul in 1799 – portrait by Antoine Gros

L'heureux malgré lui (The Man Happy in Spite of Himself) is an opera by the French composer Étienne Méhul. It takes the form of an opéra bouffon in one act. It premiered at the Opéra-Comique, Paris on 29 December 1803. The libretto is by Claude Godard d'Aucourt de Saint-Just. It was a complete failure, only enjoying two performances.

== Sources ==
- Adélaïde de Place Étienne Nicolas Méhul (Bleu Nuit Éditeur, 2005)
- Arthur Pougin Méhul: sa vie, son génie, son caractère (Fischbacher, 1889)
- General introduction to Méhul's operas in the introduction to the edition of Stratonice by M. Elizabeth C. Bartlet (Pendragon Press, 1997)
