= Ange-Étienne-Xavier Poisson de La Chabeaussière =

French writer and playwright (1752–1820)

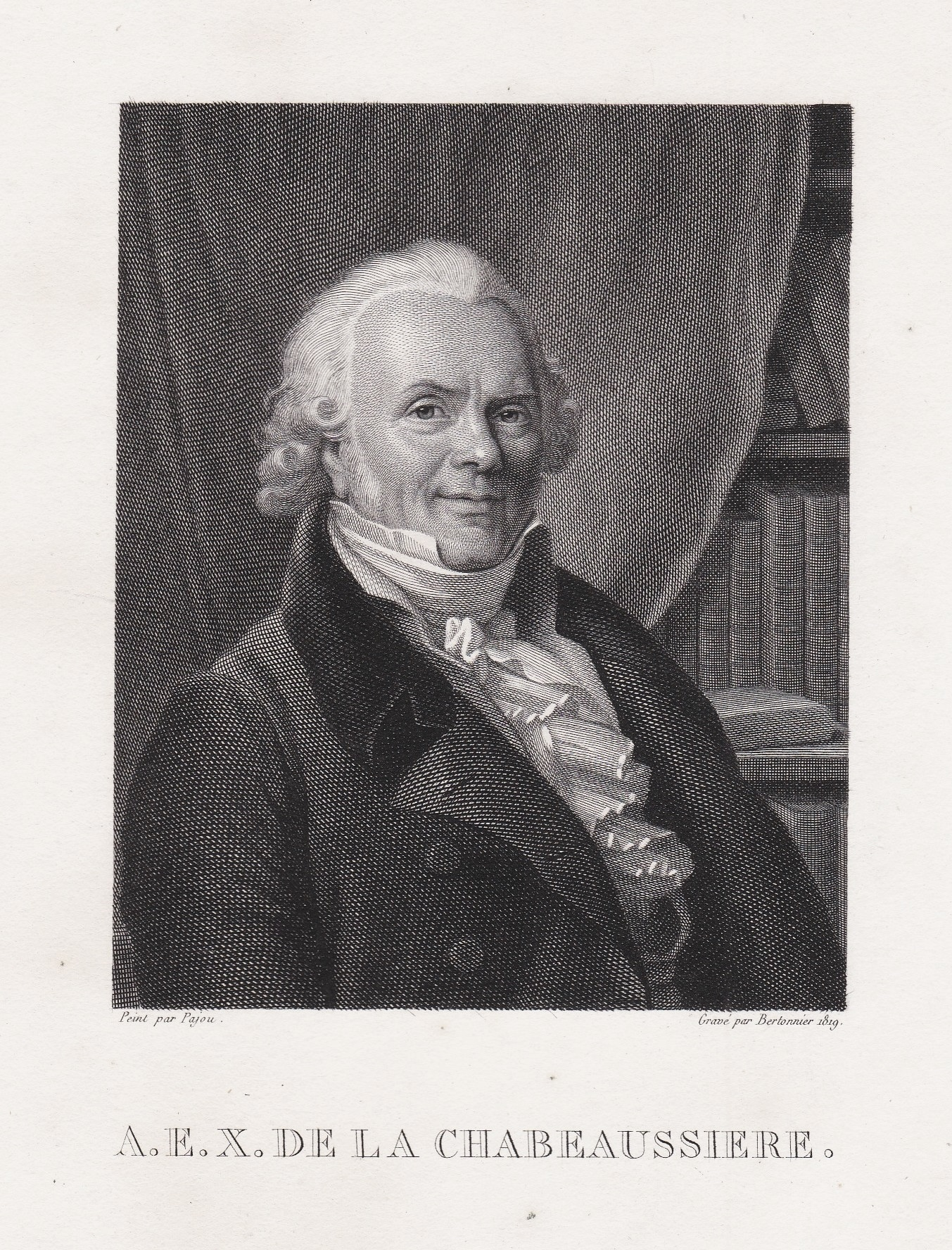
- Born: 4 December 1752; Paris, France
- Died: 10 September 1820 (aged 67); Paris, France
- Occupation: Playwright

Ange-Étienne-Xavier Poisson de La Chabeaussière (4 December 1752 – 10 September 1820) was a French writer and playwright.

== Biography ==
Like Nicolas Dalayrac, for some of whose works he wrote the libretto, La Chabeaussière served among the bodyguards of "Monsieur" (comte d'Artois). He wrote several plays.

The Catéchisme républicain philosophique et moral which he wrote, was chosen after a contest held on 9 pluviôse year II of the French Republican calendar (1793–1794), as legal official catechism for schools during the French Directory.

== Works ==
=== Book ===
- Catéchisme républicain, philosophique et moral, an II de la République.

=== Librettos ===
- L'Éclipse totale, opéra comique in one act and in verse, music by Nicolas Dalayrac, created 7 March 1782 by the troupe of Comédie-Italienne at Hôtel de Bourgogne, Paris.
- Le Corsaire, comedy in three acts and in verse, mingled with ariettes, music by Nicolas Dalayrac, created 7 March 1783, at the court of Versailles, then given 17 March 1783 at Hôtel de Bourgogne.
- Azémia ou le Nouveau Robinson , comedy in three acts and in verse mingled with ariettes, music by Micolas Dlayrac, created 17 October 1786 at court of Fontainebleau; became Azémia ou les Sauvages once set in prose, given 3 May 1787 at Opéra-Comique (salle Favart).
- Le Corsaire algérien ou le Combat naval, comedy in one act and in prose, music by Nicolas Dalayrac, created 13 messidor year I, at Opéra-Comique (salle Favart).
- Gulistan ou le Hulla de Samarcande, comedy in three acts and in prose mingled with ariettes, in collaboration with Charles-Guillaume Étienne, music by Nicolas Dalayrac, created 8 vendémiaire year XIV at Opéra-Comique (Théâtre Feydeau).

=== Theatre ===
- Lamentine ou les Tapouis, tragi-comic play in two acts and in verse, in collaboration with MM. Dalayrac, T. A. and M., created 12 August 1779 at Théâtre-Italien.
- Les Maris corrigés, comedy in three acts and in verse, created 7 August 1781 at Théâtre-Italien.

=== Songs ===
- Couplets pour la fête de Madame la Comtesse de M., chantés par Mademoiselle sa Fille, lyrics by M.de la Chabeaussière (écuyer), music by M. Dalayrac, 1784
- Chant martial for victory party, music by François-Joseph Gossec, premiered 20 prairial year IV (29 May 1796).

=== Musical accompagnements ===
- Romance du Chevrier (current "Plaisir d'amour"), lyrics from Célestine, short story by Jean-Pierre Claris de Florian, with a tune by Jean-Paul-Égide Martini, publishing of a guitar accompaniment in 1785. (Note: It has been suggested that Poisson de La Chabeaussière was a third forgotten cowriter. In a 1785 periodical, this song appeared under the title Romance nouvelle with no further appellation. It was stated: Accompagnement de guitare par M.de La Chabeaussière. In fact, the first version of this romance is kept at Bibliothèque nationale de France. BnF 42281735k. It is part of a collection including a comic opera and three romances, titled Première romance. Romance du Chevrier dans Célestine, nouvelle de M. le Ch^{r} de Florian. The editor says: "The author of the music of this work was forced to make himself harp or fortepiano accompaniments ... In addition to the harp or pianoforte accompaniments, there are parts of violins, viola and bass for three romances to be accompanied with the orchestra.")

== Iconography ==
De La Chabeaussière was portrayed by

- Joseph Ducreux, 1795 Salon, no. 234
- Robert Lefèvre, 1804 Salon, no. 391
- Jacques-Augustin-Catherine Pajou (Note: Like Pajou, Poisson de La Chabeaussière was a member of the Société Philotechnique.) Salon of 1819, no. 806. In 1943, it was acquired in a public sale by the National Museum of Versailles and Trianon.
- He also appeared on a print Une Soirée chez la princesse Constance de Salm among 38 other literary and artistic personalities of the salon of Constance de Salm.

== Notes and references ==
References
