= Charles Isabelle =

French architect

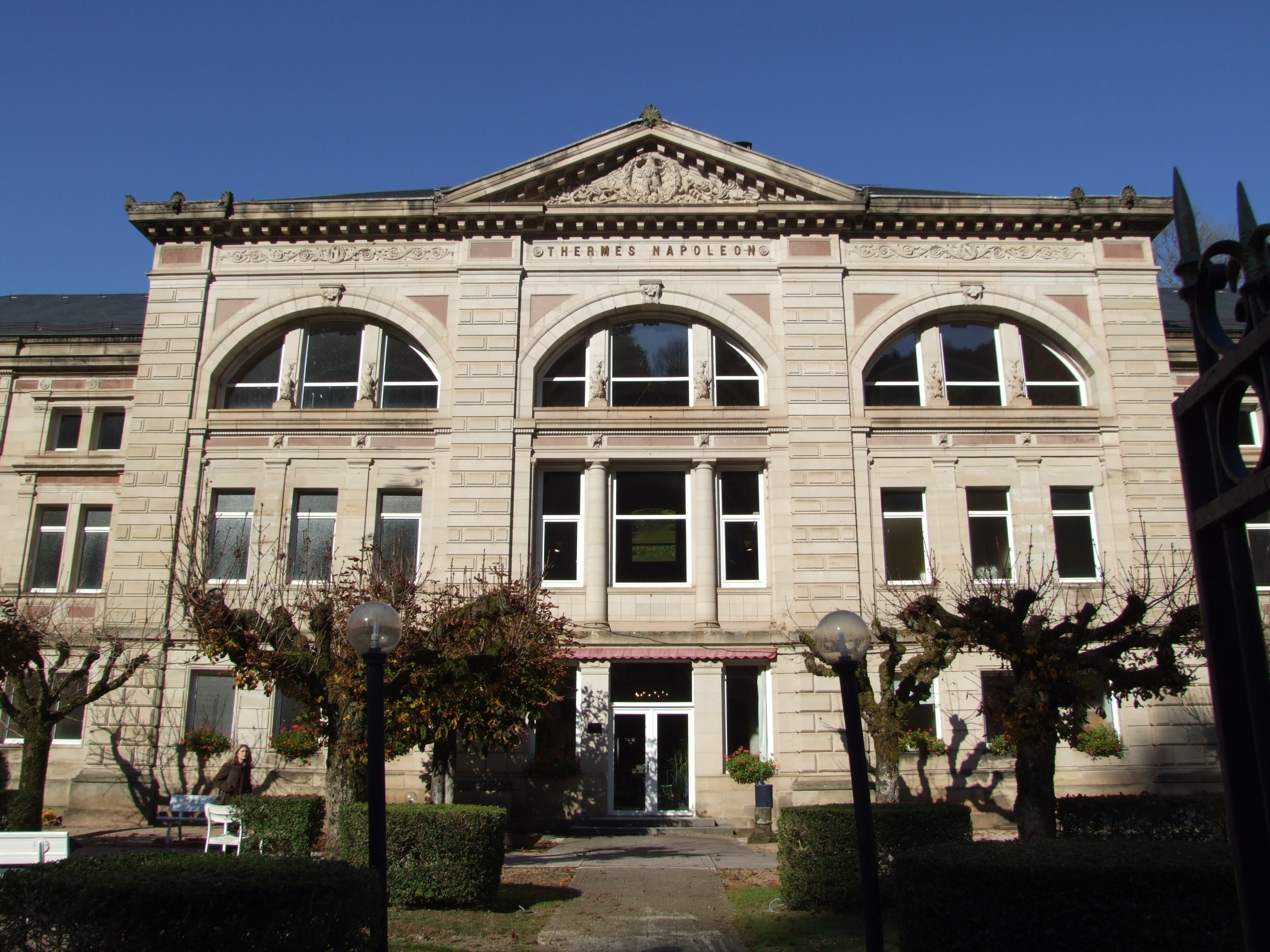
Plombières Baths

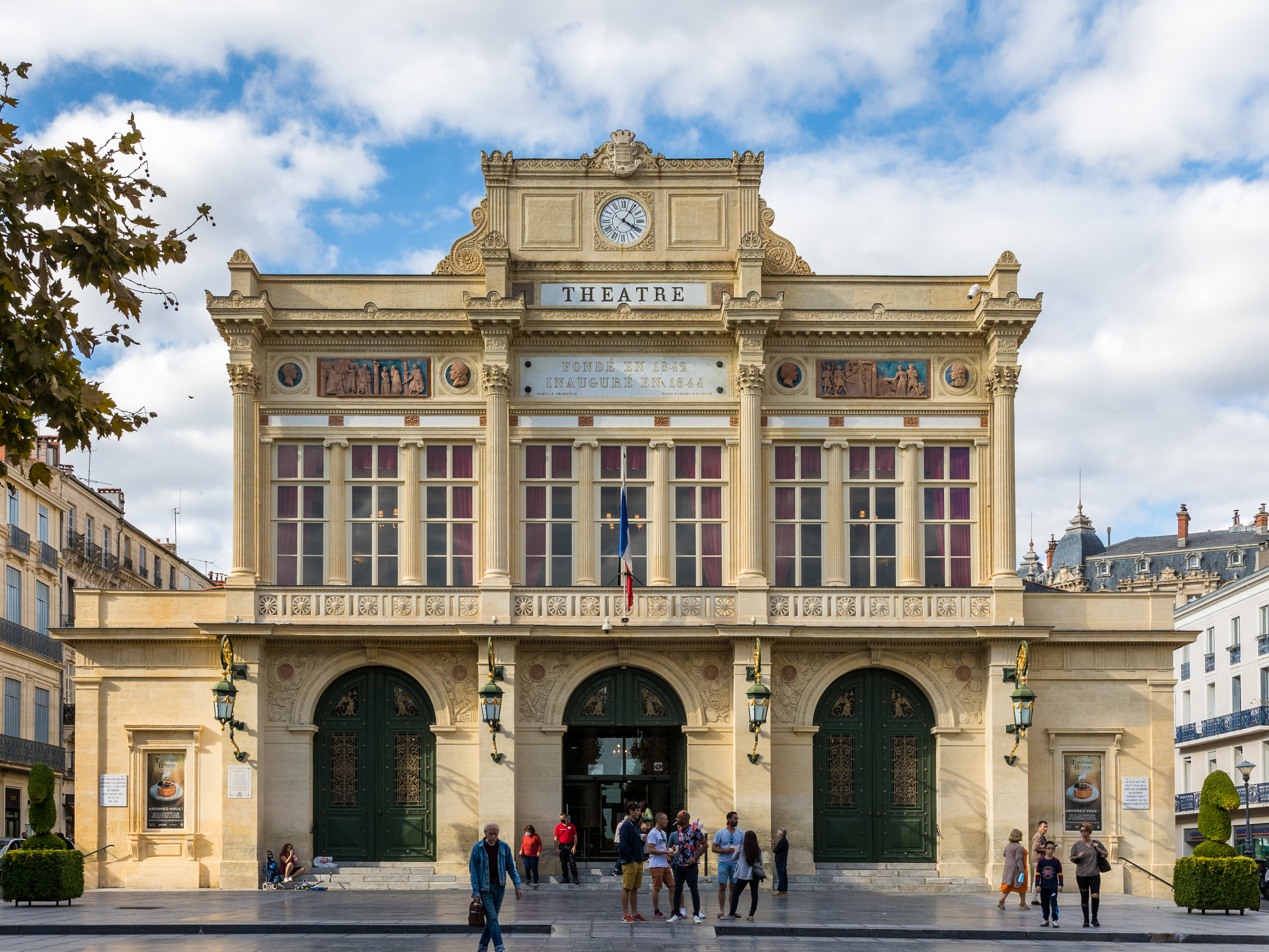
Béziers Theatre

Charles-Edouard Isabelle (24 February 1800– 1 May 1880) was a French architect.

== Life ==
Isabelle studied at the Beaux-Arts de Paris between 1818 and 1824 with Achille Leclère. In 1828 he was inspector of works at the Madeleine church in Paris. Isabelle taught architecture at the School of Arts and Crafts of Châlons-en-Champagne between 1845 and 1880. He was appointed Architect of thermal baths. He became an officer of the Legion of Honor (1862).

== Works ==
- Rouen Customs House (1835 – 1842) (destroyed in 1944)
- School of Arts and Crafts of Angers (enlargements) (1855–1877)
- Baths of Plombières (1869)
- Béziers Theater
- Tomb of David d'Angers in Paris
- Tomb of Geoffroy Saint-Hilaire in Paris
- Tomb of François Adrien Boieldieu in Rouen
