= Jean-Élie Bédéno Dejaure =

French playwright

Jean-Élie Bédéno Dejaure (1766, Paris – 5 October 1799) was an 18th-century French playwright. His son, Jean-Claude Bédéno Dejaure, called Dejaure fils was also a playwright.

== Life ==
When he presented his first plays to the Italian actors, for them to treat him with some respect, Dejaure had added the title "Baron" to his name, although he was the son of a merchant. But after his early success, he renounced this title, which he no longer needed. From 1789 to 1795, he gave the Comédie-Italienne as well as the Théâtre-Français, eighteen theatre plays, comedies, operas and opéras comiques (including several with Rodolphe Kreutzer), of little invention but interesting, with dramatic effects and morality, which have been successful for most of them.

== Main works ==
- 1789: Les Époux réunis, one-act comedy, in verse
- 1790: Ferdinand ou la Suite des Deux Pages, one-act opéra comique
- 1791: Lodoïska ou les Tartares, three-act opéra-comique, music by Rodolphe Kreutzer
- 1791: Louise de Valsan, three-act comedy
- 1791: L’Incertitude maternelle ou la Chose impossible, comedy in one act and in verse
- 1791: Le Franc-Breton ou le Négociant de Nantes, comedy in one act and in verse, later transformed into an opéra comique on a music by Kreutzer
- 1796: Imogène ou la Gageure indiscrète, opéra comique in three acts and in verse imitated from Cymbeline by Shakespeare
- 1798: La Dot de Suzette, one-act opéra comique mingled with ariettes, music by François-Adrien Boïeldieu
- 1798: Les Quiproquos espagnols, two-act opera with ariettes, music by Devienne
- 1799: Montano et Stéphanie, three-act opéra comique, music by Henri Montan Berton
- 1801: Astyanax, three-act opéra comique, music by Kreutzer.

== Sources ==
- Ferdinand Hoefer, Nouvelle Biographie générale, t.XIII, Paris, Firmin-Didot, 1866, (p. 375–6).
