= Achille Leclère =

French architect

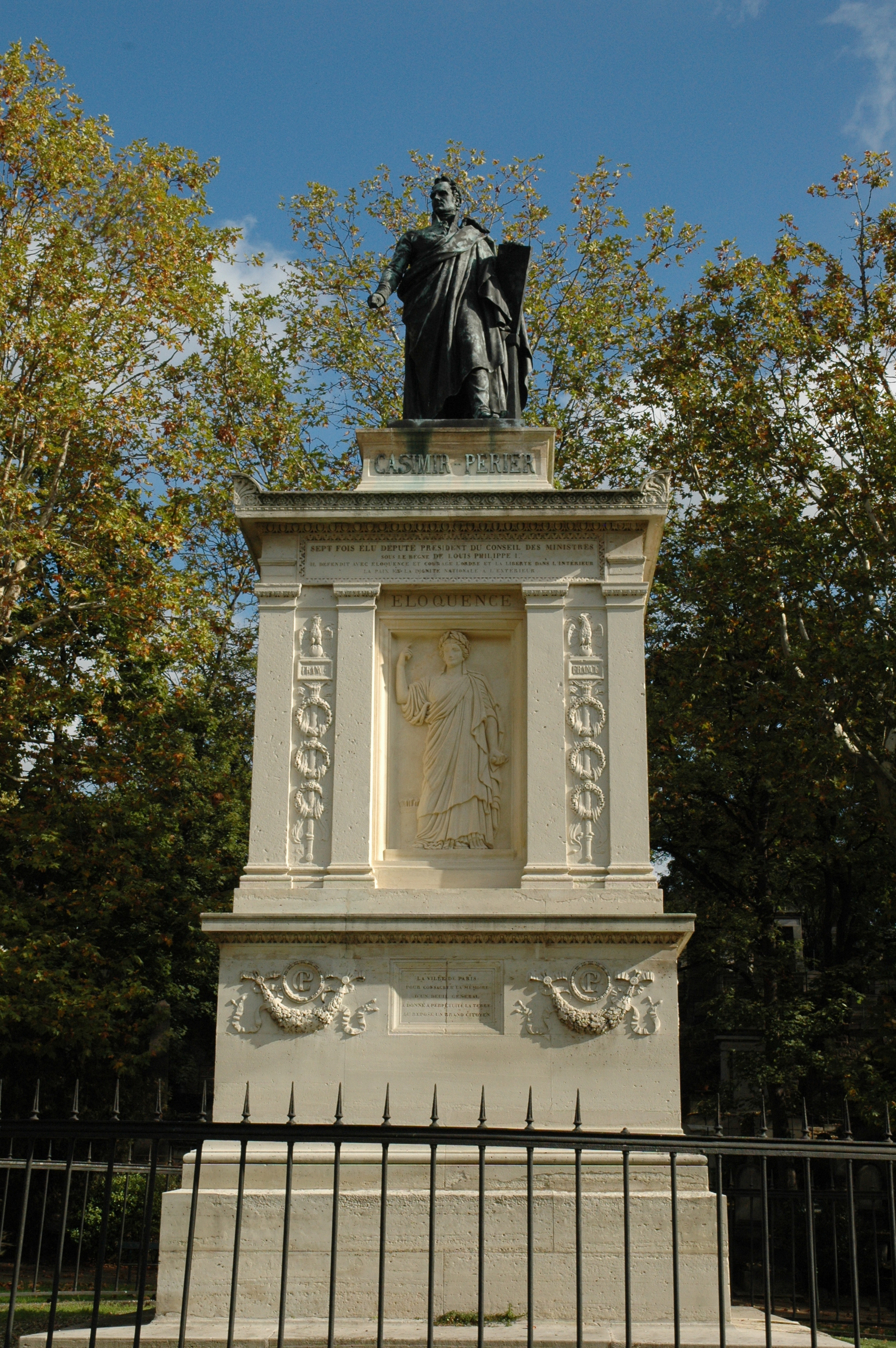
The tomb of Casimir Perier.

Achille-François-René Leclère (29 October 1785 – 23 December 1853) was a French architect and teacher of architecture.

Achille Leclère studied architecture under Charles Percier and Jean-Nicolas-Louis Durand. After finishing his studies, he won the 1808 Premier Grand Prix de Rome where the final round topic was, "Public baths in Paris".

In 1813, Leclère made a noted restoration of the Pantheon in Rome. Indeed, Achille Leclere's architectural drawings of the Pantheon are regarded by many as the best ever made.

In 1815, he opened a renowned architectural atelier from which many eminent architects graduated, including the French architects Eugène Viollet-le-Duc, Paul Abadie, Charles Isabelle and Alfred Armand and the English architect Richard Lane.

He was elected a member of the Académie des Beaux-Arts of the Institut de France in 1831.
