= Claude Godard d'Aucour =

French writer (1716–1795)

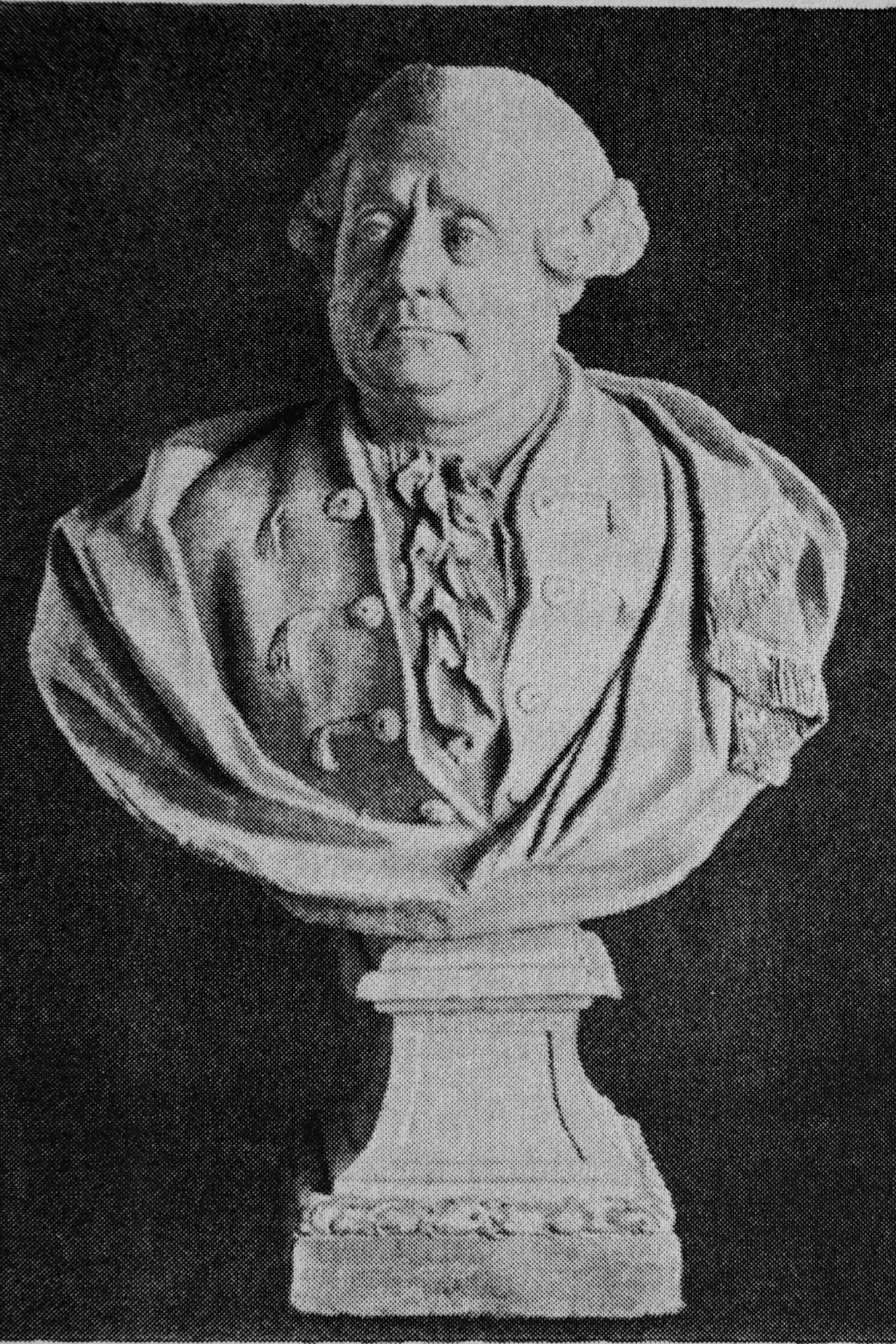
Bust of Claude Godart d'Aucourt by Gros

Claude Godard d'Aucourt (1716–1795) was an 18th-century French writer, marquis of Plancy.

He became a fermier général in 1754 and Receveur général des finances in Alençon in 1785. He did not migrate during the French Revolution and managed to retain a portion of his non manorial estate. The librettist Claude Godard d'Aucourt de Saint-Just was his son.

== Works ==
- 1745: Les Mémoires turcs, avec l'Histoire galante de deux jeunes Turcs durant leur séjour en France
- 1745: Thémidore ou Mon Histoire et celle de ma maîtresse

=== Librettos ===
- 1798: Zoraïme et Zulnar
