= Claude Godard d'Aucourt de Saint-Just =

French librettist

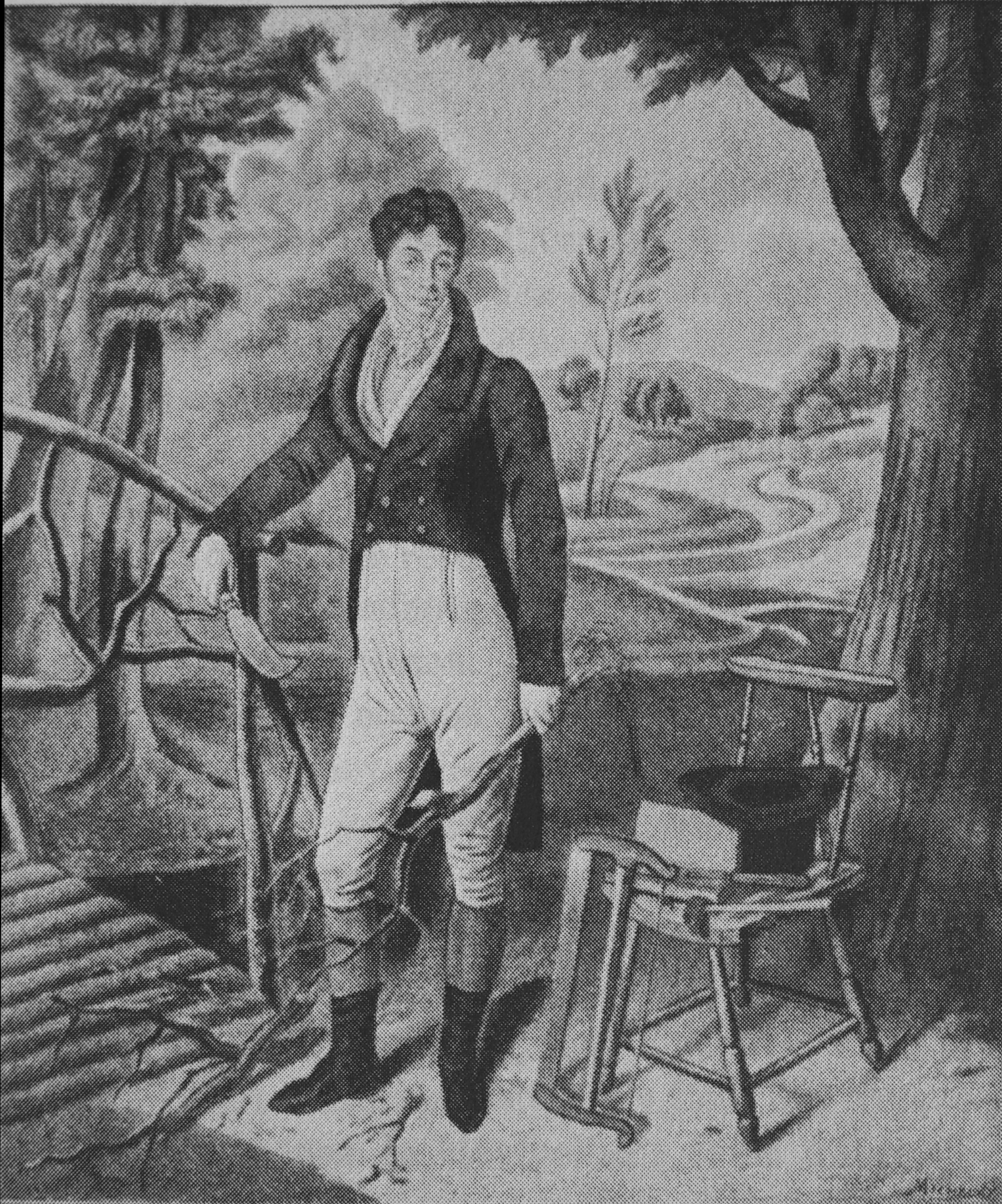
- Born: 14 July 1768; Paris, France
- Died: 17 March 1826 (aged 57); Paris, France
- Occupation: Librettist

Claude Godard d'Aucourt called de Saint-Just (14 July 1768 – 17 March 1826) was a French librettist.

Born in Paris, he was the son of Claude Godard d'Aucour, marquis of Plancy, a fermier général. Being a younger son, he bore the name st-Just which was a dependent lordship of Plancy. He wrote the librettos of several opéras comiques by François Adrien Boieldieu such as:

- 1797: L'Heureuse Nouvelle
- 1797: La Famille suisse
- 1798: Zoraïme et Zulnar
- 1799: Emma, ou la Prisonnière
- 1799: Les Méprises espagnoles
- 1800: Le calife de Bagdad
- 1803: L'heureux malgré lui by Étienne Méhul
- 1806: Gabrielle d'Estrées by E. Méhul
- 1812: Jean de Paris.

He gave himself the collection of his Œuvres (Paris, 1826, 2 volumes in-8°).

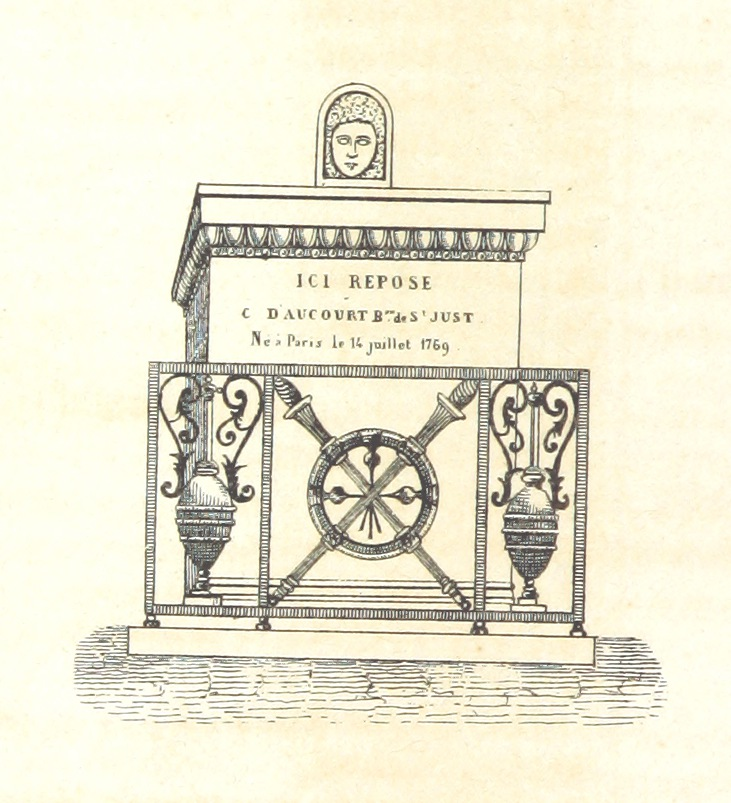
Godard d'Aucourt de Saint-Just's grave at Père Lachaise Cemetery.

His father had himself given some books of libertine inspiration, including Les Mémoires turcs, avec l'Histoire galante de deux jeunes Turcs durant leur séjour en France (1745), which were very successful, or Thémidore ou Mon histoire et celle de ma maîtresse (1745).

Claude Godard d'Aucourt died in Paris 17 March 1826 and is buried at cimetière du Père-Lachaise (19th division).
