= Opéra féerie =

Opera genre

Opéra féerie (French: [ɔ.pe.ʁa fe.ʁi]; plural: opéras féeries) is a French genre of opera or opéra-ballet where the plot is based on fairy tales, often with elements of magic in their stories. Popular in the 18th century, from the time of Jean-Philippe Rameau onwards, the form reached its culmination with works such as La Belle au bois dormant by Michele Carafa and Cendrillon by Nicolas Isouard at the beginning of the 19th century.

Examples of the genre include:

- Zémire et Azor (1771), music by André Grétry
- Cendrillon (1810) and Aladin ou la Lampe merveilleuse (1822), music by Nicolas Isouard, libretti by Charles-Guillaume Étienne
- Zirphile et fleur de myrte ou cent ans en un jour (1818), music by Charles-Simon Catel, libretto by Victor-Joseph Étienne de Jouy and Nicolas Lefebvre
- Le cheval de bronze (1835), music by Daniel Auber
- La fée aux roses (1849), libretto by Jules-Henri Vernoy de Saint-Georges and Eugène Scribe, music by Fromental Halévy, Paris, Théâtre de l'Opéra-Comique
- La chatte blanche (1852) by the Frères Cogniard
- Les amours du diable (1853), by Jules-Henri Vernoy de Saint-Georges, music by Albert Grisar, Paris, Théâtre Lyrique
- Le roi Carotte (1872) and Le voyage dans la lune (1875), music by Jacques Offenbach (the first in collaboration with Victorien Sardou)
- L'eau qui danse, le pomme qui chante et l'oiseau qui dit la vérité (2009), by Canadian composer Gilles Tremblay and Pierre Morency

== See also ==
- Fairy-tale opera
- Féerie
