= Jean de Paris (Boieldieu) =

French opera-comique

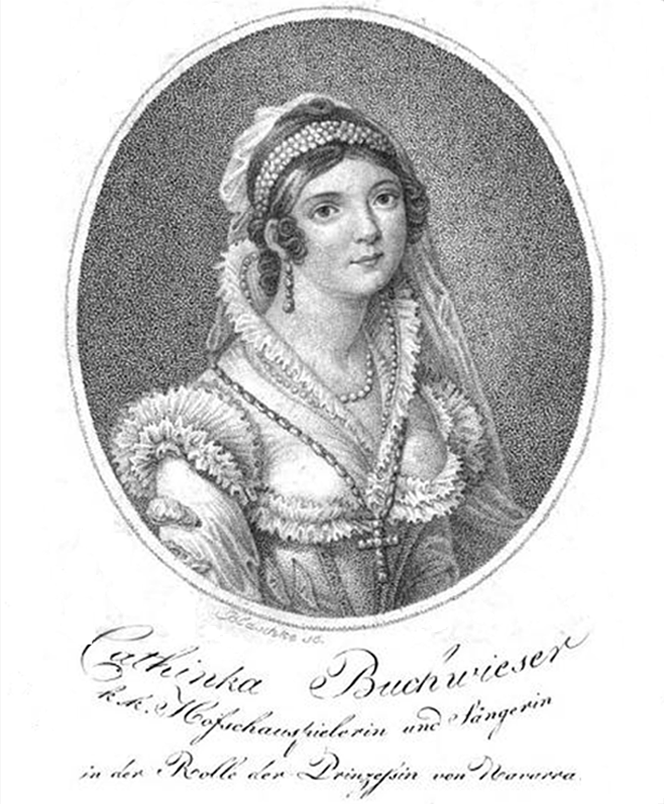
Cathinka Buchwieser in the role of Princess of Navarre in Theater an der Wien 1813

Jean de Paris is an opéra comique in two acts by French composer François-Adrien Boieldieu and librettist Claude Godard d'Aucourt de Saint-Just.

== History ==
The work had its premiere on 4 April 1812 at the Opéra-Comique in Paris and was performed there until 1863. The opera was dedicated to the composer André Grétry. Jean de Paris was a great success for Boieldieu, who returned to the Parisian opera stage in 1812 with this opera comique after a seven-year stay in Saint Petersburg.

In the same year as the premiere in Paris, Jean de Paris was also performed in various German translations in Germany and Austria. Ignaz Franz Castelli provided his translation for the Theater am Kärntnertor (Vienna), Ignaz von Seyfried worked for the Theater an der Wien and the translation by Karl Alexander Herklots was staged in Berlin.

This opera – and its subject matter – enjoyed great popularity, so that as early as 1818 a new setting by Francesco Morlacchi (music) and Felice Romani (libretto) was performed in Milan. In 1831, Gaetano Donizetti composed his Gianni di Parigi. In 1969, Ernst Gärtner, Arthur Scherle and Siegfried Köhler worked out their new version of John of Paris.

== Plot ==
Act 1

Square in front of the inn (against a wild mountain backdrop)

The Princess of Navarre travels to Paris to marry the Dauphin. Deep in the Pyrenees, an inn is chosen to host the princess and her entourage. Everything is ready and waiting for the guest (chorus "Do not fail, do your duty"). Disguised under the name "Jean of Paris", the Dauphin travels to meet his bride at this very inn.

Olivier, Jean's servant, arrives and demands room and board for his master (terzet "Welcome Mr Innkeeper"). Then the princess's chief seneschal appears and announces her imminent arrival (aria "Because we will now have to be obeyed here in the house"). But Jean de Paris, who has arrived together with the princess, insists on having certain privileges as the one who has arrived earlier (quartet: Jean de Paris, Chief Seneschal, Pedrigo, Lorezza "May a man dare such a thing?"). The princess arrives at the inn (aria "What pleasure does travel grant"). She is the only one who recognises her bridegroom in Jean and wants to counter his trickery with another. She therefore kindly accepts his invitation to a joint midday meal.

Act 2

Square in front of the inn (later in the day)

After dinner, the two bridal parties sit together. Olivier sings a romance ("The troubadour, proud of love's bonds") Jean de Paris joins in after the first verse, the Princess after the second. After this song, all those present gather and sing with the chorus ("When castanets sound"). Jean then reveals himself as Dauphin and bridegroom and everyone joins in the final song "Glory to beauty").

== Roles ==
Cast	Voice type	Premiere cast, 29 March 1821
La princesse de Navarre (Princess of Navarre)	soprano	Antoinette Lemonnier ('Mlle Regnault')
Le grand sénéchal (Chief Seneschal of the Princess)	baritone	Jean-Blaise Martin
Jean de Paris (John of Paris)	tenor	Jean Elleviou
Olivier	soprano (breeches role)	Alexandrine Marie Agathe Gavaudan-Ducamel ('Mme Gavaudan')
Pédrigo, le maître d'auberge (Innkeeper)	bass	Marcel-Jean-Antoine Juillet ('M. Juliet')
Lorezza, sa fille (His daughter)	soprano	Alexandrine Saint-Aubin

== Recording ==
An October 1966 studio broadcast was issued on CD by Collection Gaieté-Lyrique, with Joseph Peyron in the title role, Denise Boursin as the princess, Monique Stiot as Lorezza, Henri Gui as the seneschal, Gérard Friedmann as Oliver, with Jean-Paul Kréder conducting the Orchestre Lyrique of the ORTF.
