= Jeanne-Charlotte Schroeder =

French opera singer

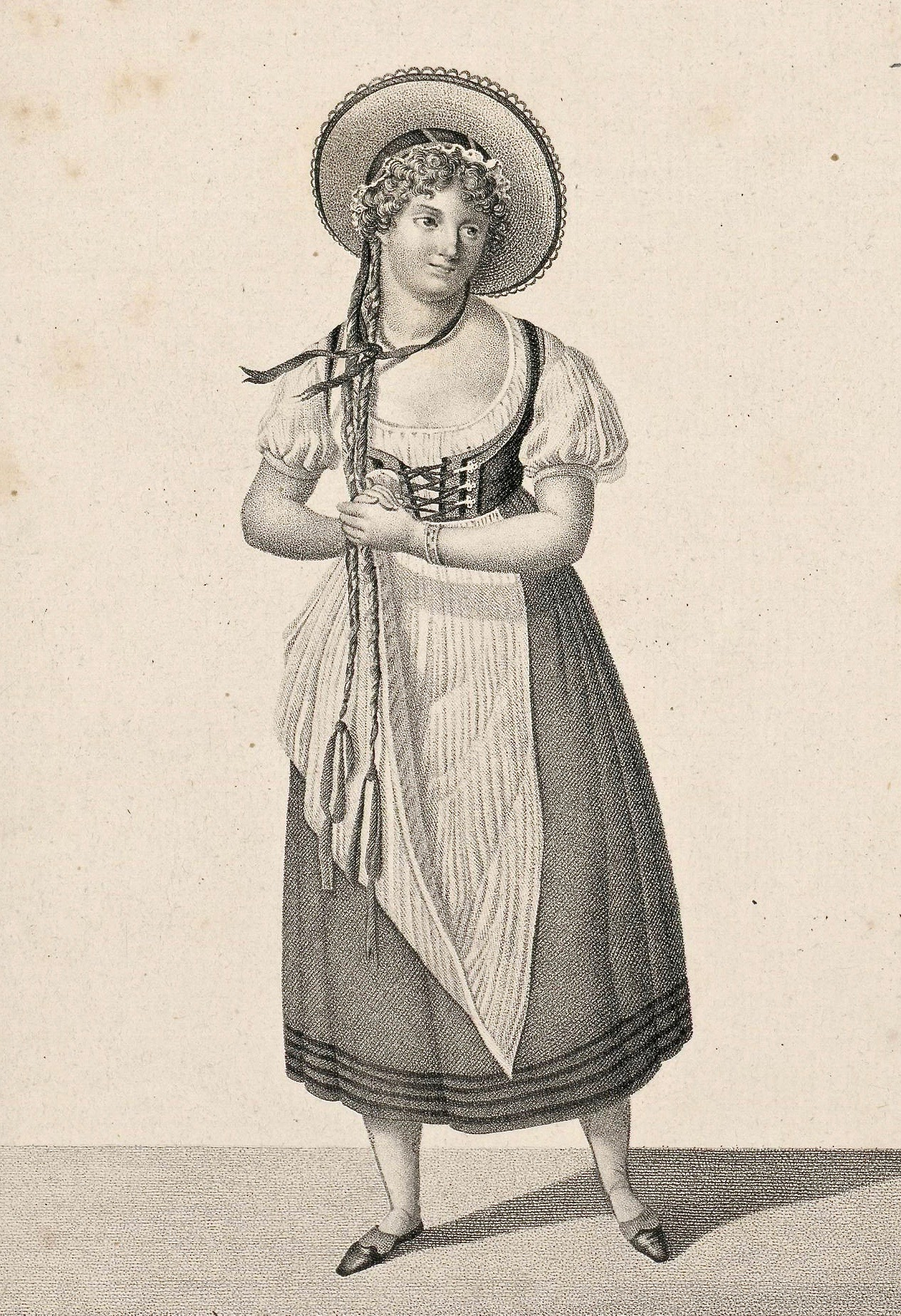
Schroeder in the title role of Grétry's opera Lisbeth

Jeanne-Charlotte Schroeder, also known as Madame Saint-Aubin, (9 December 1764 – 11 September 1850), was a French opera singer who sang leading soprano roles with the Comédie-Italienne and the Opéra-Comique. In 1782, she married the actor and singer Augustin-Alexandre Saint-Aubin (1754–1818). The couple's four children were also musicians. Jean-Denis Saint-Auban (1783–c.1810) was a violinist and composer. Louis-Philibert Saint-Aubin (1784–1846) was a professor at the Paris Conservatory. Cécile Saint-Aubin (1785–1862) and Alexandrine Saint-Aubin (1793–1867) were both opera singers.

== Biography ==
Charlotte Schroeder was the daughter of Frédéric Schroeder (known in Dutch as Frederik Schreuder)—a Dutch military officer who later became an actor, stage manager, and theater director—and Antoinette Malter, who was born in Lyon in 1727. She had four siblings who were also performers: the eldest, Louise-Frédérique (also known as Caroline; c. 1747–48 – 1780), a dancer and actress—known first as Mlle Frédéric and later as Mme Moulinghen—who became a sociétaire (member) of the Comédie-Italienne in 1769; Françoise-Jacqueline (born in The Hague, October 26, 1750; death date unknown), known as "Mlle Frédéric the Younger," who was a dancer and singer at the Comédie-Italienne; Frédéric-Pierre (born in Amsterdam, October 7, 1758; died in Paris, 1843), who served as a principal dancer at the Comédie-Italienne in 1779 and at the Opéra in 1781; and Mme Lambert, who made her debut at the Comédie-Italienne in 1781.
