= Le calife de Bagdad =

- Opéra comique by François-Adrien Boieldieu
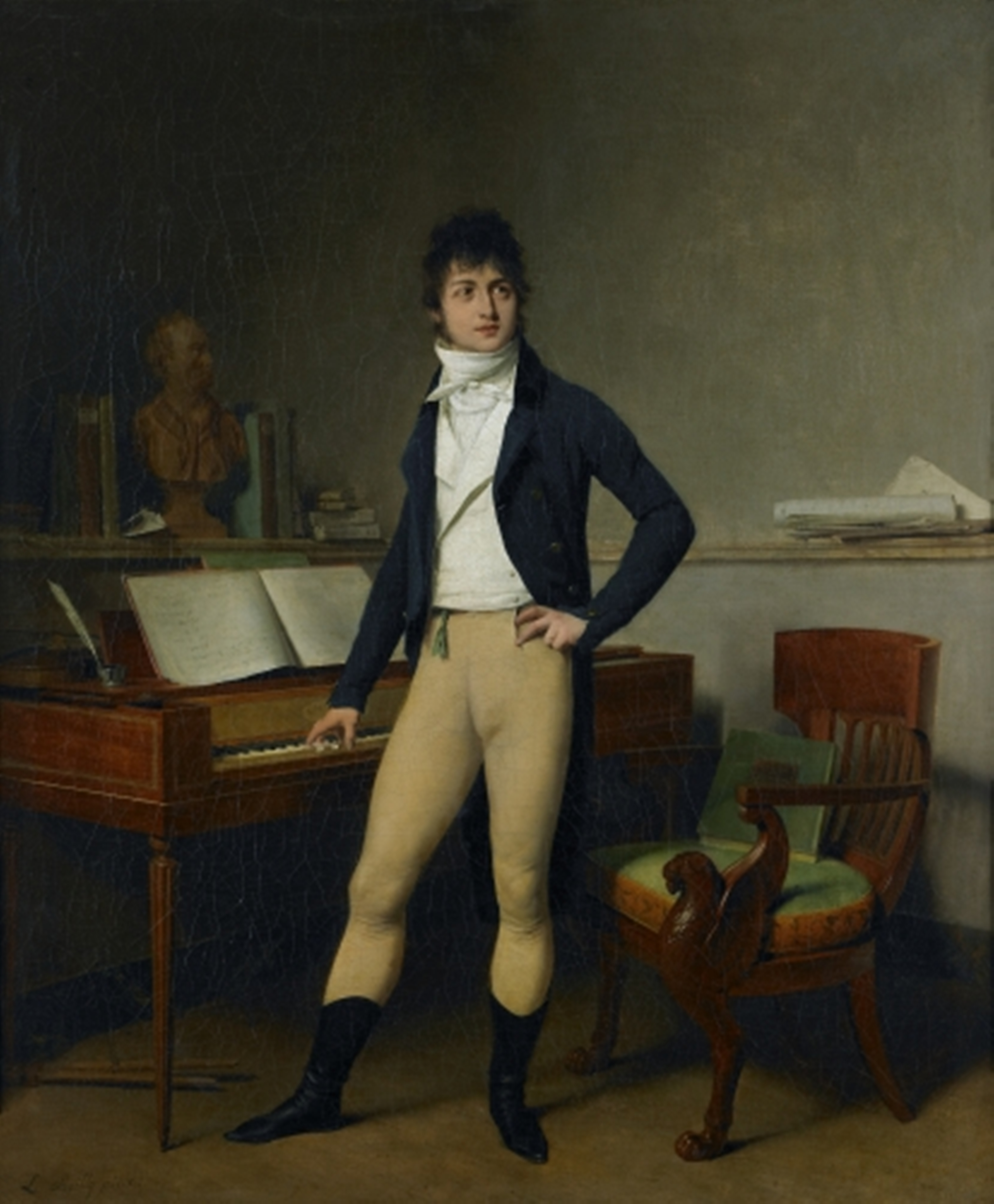
- The composer c. 1800
- Translation: The Caliph of Baghdad
- Librettist: Claude Godard d'Aucourt de Saint-Just
- Language: French
- Premiere: 16 September 1800; Opéra-Comique, Paris

Le calife de Bagdad (The Caliph of Baghdad) is an opéra comique in one act by the French composer François-Adrien Boieldieu with a libretto by Claude Godard d'Aucourt de Saint-Just. Dedicated to the landscape painter Bidauld it was first performed at the Opéra-Comique, Paris, on 16 September 1800 and soon became highly popular throughout Europe.

It was Boieldieu's first major triumph. One member of the audience who was less impressed was the noted composer Luigi Cherubini who reproached Boieldieu, "Aren't you ashamed of such a great success, and doing so little to deserve it?" Boieldieu immediately applied to Cherubini for lessons in compositional techniques.

Le calife de Bagdad was part of the vogue for operas on Oriental subjects and the music makes use of local colour, especially the overture with its prominent "eastern" percussion. Késie's aria "De tous pays" is a bravura piece which illustrates the musical styles of several European countries, including Spain, Italy, Germany, Scotland and England. Le calife de Bagdad is believed to have influenced Carl Maria von Weber, particularly his operas Abu Hassan and Oberon.

== Roles ==
Roles, voice types, premiere cast
Cast	Voice type	Premiere, 16 September 1800
Isaoun, the caliph	tenor	Jean Elleviou
Zétulbé, a young woman of Baghdad	soprano	Alexandrine Marie Agathe Gavaudan-Ducamel (Mme Gavaudan)
Késie, her friend	soprano	Philis
Lémaïde, Zétulbé's mother	mezzo-soprano	Louise Dugazon
A judge	tenor	

== Synopsis ==
Isaoun, the Caliph of Baghdad, has adopted a disguise so he can roam the streets of the city freely, going under the name "Il Bondocani". Two months before the action begins, he rescued Zétulbé from a band of brigands and Zétulbé has fallen in love with him. But Zétulbé's mother, Lémaïde, is unimpressed by his shabby appearance and refuses to let her marry him. She is amazed when "Il Bondocani" orders his followers to bring in gifts including a casket of jewels. Thinking "Il Bondocani" is a brigand, Lémaïde's neighbour has reported him to the police, who now try to break down the door. After further intrigue, Isaoun finally reveals his true identity to Zétulbé and the two can now be married.

== Recordings ==
- Le calife de Bagdad Laurence Dale, Lydia Mayo, Joelle Michelini, Claudine Cheriez, Chorus and Orchestra of the Camerata de Provence, conducted by Antonio de Almeida (Sonpact, 1993)
- The overture, a popular concert piece, has been recorded separately many times.
