= Les voitures versées =

1908 opéra comique by François-Adrien Boieldieu

Les voitures versées (1808) is an opéra comique in two acts by François-Adrien Boieldieu after Amour et mystère, ou Lequel est mon cousin? (1807) and before Rien de trop, ou Les deux paravents (1810). The libretto is based on Emmanuel Dupaty's comedy Le séducteur en voyage (1806).

A revised version of the work was premiered at the Opéra-Comique on 29 April 1920.
