= Charles-Guillaume Étienne =

French dramatist and politician (1778–1845)

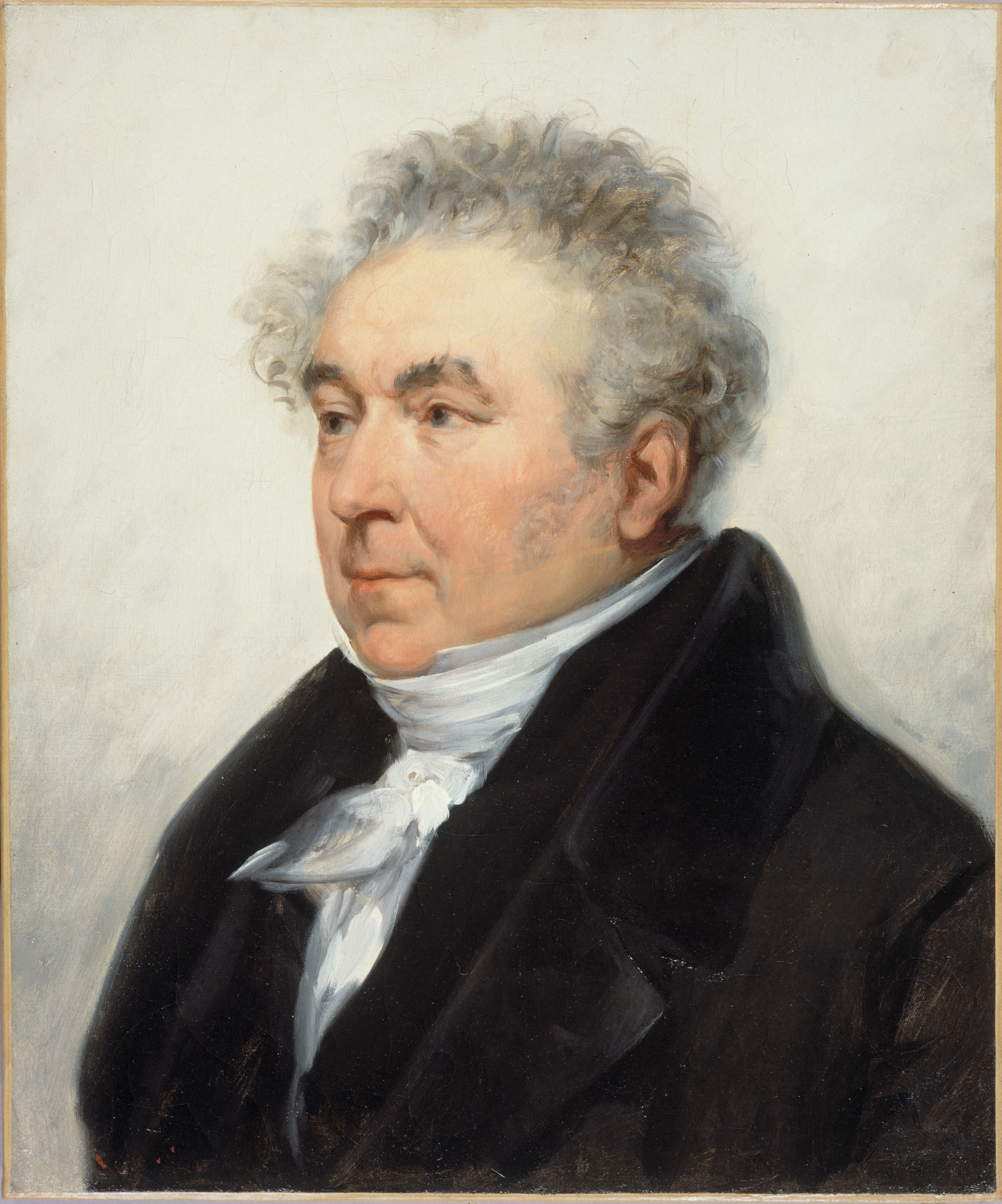
Charles-Guillaume Étienne

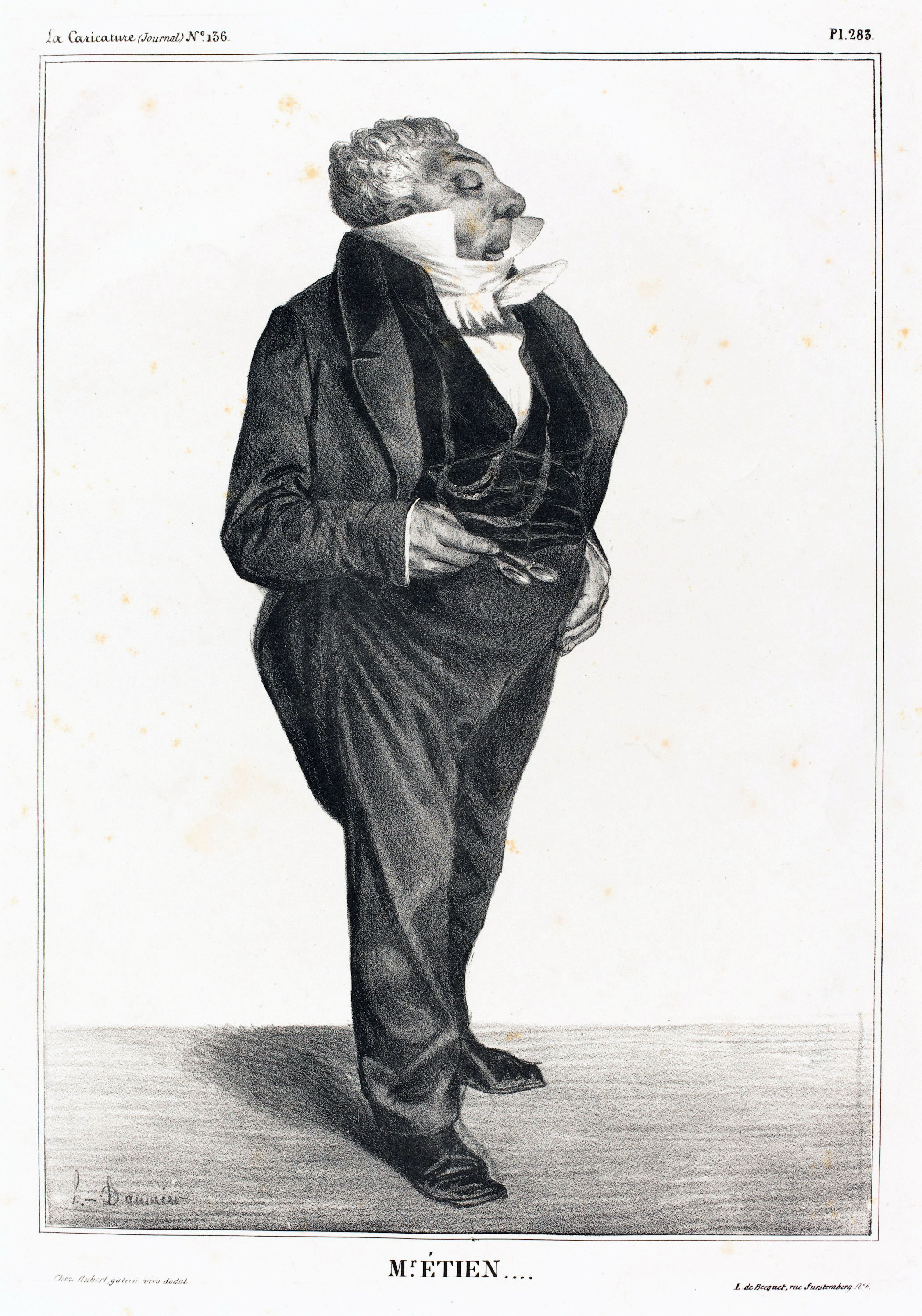
Caricature by Honoré Daumier, 1833

Charles-Guillaume Étienne (French pronunciation: [ʃaʁl ɡijom etjɛn]; 5 January 1778 – 13 March 1845) was a 19th-century French playwright.

== Biography ==
He was born in Chamouilley, Haute-Marne. He held various municipal offices under the Revolution and came in 1793 to Paris, where he produced his first opera, Le Rêve, in 1799, in collaboration with Antoine-Frédéric Gresnick. Although Étienne continued to write for the Paris theatres for twenty years from that date, he is remembered chiefly as the author of one comedy, which excited considerable controversy. Les Deux Gendres was represented at the Théâtre Français on 11 August 1810, and procured for its author a seat in the Académie française.

A rumour was put in circulation that Étienne had drawn largely on a manuscript play in the imperial library, entitled Conaxa, ou les gendres dupes. His rivals were not slow to take up the charge of plagiarism, to which Étienne replied that the story was an old one (it existed in an old French fabliaus) and had already been treated by Alexis Piron in Les Fils ingrats.

He was, however, driven later to make admissions which at least showed a certain lack of candour. The bitterness of the attacks made on him was no doubt in part due to his position as editor-in-chief of the official Journal de l'Empire. His next play, L'Intrigante (1812), hardly maintained the high level of Les Deux Gendres; the patriotic opera L'Oriflamme and his lyric masterpiece Joconde date from 1814.

Étienne had been secretary to Hugues-Bernard Maret, Duc de Bassano, and in this capacity had accompanied Napoleon throughout his campaigns in Italy, Germany, Austria and Poland. During these journeys he produced one of his best pieces, Brueys et Palaprat (1807). During the Restoration Étienne was an active member of the opposition. He was seven times returned as deputy for the département of Meuse, and was in full sympathy with the revolution of 1830, but the reforms actually carried out did not fulfil his expectations, and he gradually retired from public life. Among his other plays may be noted: Les Deux Mères, Le Pacha de Suresnes, and La Petite Ecole des pres, all produced in 1802, in collaboration with his friend Charles Gaugiran de Nanteuil (1778–1830).

With Alphonse Dieudonné Martainville (1779–1830) he wrote an Histoire du Théâtre Français (5 vols, 1802) during the revolutionary period. Étienne was a bitter opponent of the romanticists, one of whom, Alfred de Vigny, was his successor and panegyrist in the academy. He was an Officer in the Legion of Honour, and was buried in the Père Lachaise Cemetery in Paris.

In Bruis et Palaprat, Étienne penned the phrase "On n'est jamais servi si bien que par soi-même", which has widely been translated as "If you want something done right, do it yourself", although the literal translation is "One is never served so well as by oneself".

== Works ==
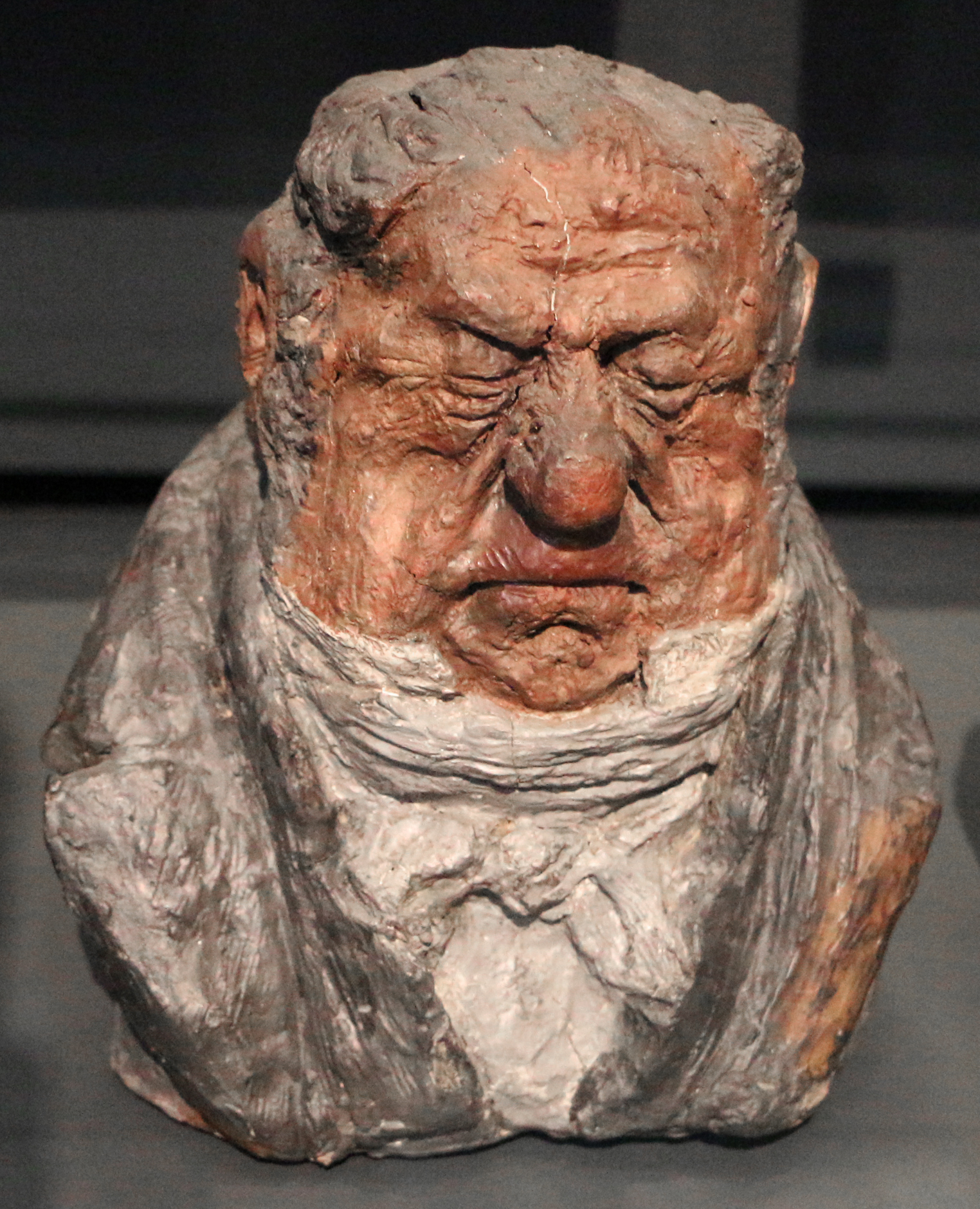
Caricature by Honoré Daumier

Theatre

- 1799: Le Rêve, opéra comique in 1 act and in prose, lyrics by citizen Étienne, music by citizen Gresnich, Paris, Opéra-Comique, 8 pluviôse an VII
- 1800: Rembrandt ou la Vente après décès, vaudeville anecdotique in 1 act, by citizens Étienne, Morel, Servière and Moras, Théâtre des Troubadours, 26 fructidor an VIII
- 1800: Le Chaudronnier, Homme d'État, comedy in three acts and in prose, Théâtre de l'Ambigu-Comique, 1er thermidor an VIII
- 1800: La Lettre sans adresse, comedy in 1 act and in prose, mingled with vaudevilles... by citizens Étienne and Moras, Théâtre des Troubadours, 26 vendémiaire an IX
- 1800: L'Apollon du Belvédere ou l'Oracle, folie-vaudeville impromptue in 1 act, by citizens Étienne, Moras and Gaugiran-Nanteuil, Théâtre des Troubadours, 29, 30 brumaire, 1er, 2 and 3 frimaire an IX
- 1801: Pont-de-Veyle ou le Bonnet de docteur, comédie en vaudeville in 1 act, by citizens Gosse and Étienne, Théâtre des Variétés, 6 vendémiaire an X
- 1801: Désirée ou la Paix du village, allegory in 1 act, in vaudevilles, by citizens Gaugiran-Nanteuil, Moras and Étienne, Théâtre Favart, 5 germinal an IX
- 1801: Le Grand Deuil, opéra bouffon, lyrics by citizens J.-B. Vial eand C.-G. Étienne, music by citizen H. Berton, Opéra-comique, 1er pluviôse an IX
- 1802: Le Pacha de Suresnes ou l'Amitié des femmes, comédie-anecdote in 1 act and in prose, by citizens C.-G. Étienne and Gaugiran-Nanteuil, Théâtre Louvois, 11 prairial an X
- La Petite École des pères, comedy in 1 act and in prose, by C.-G. Étienne and Gaugiran-Nanteuil, Théâtre Louvois, 8 nivôse an XI
- 1803: Le Pauvre Riche ou la Séparation de biens, comedy in three acts and in prose written in society with Mr. Nanteuil, Théâtre Louvois, en vendémiaire an XII
- 1803: Les Maris en bonne fortune, comedy in 3 acts, Théâtre Louvois, 9 germinal an XI
- 1804: La Jeune Femme en colère, comedy in 1 act and in prose, Théâtre de l'Impératrice, 28 vendémiaire an XIII
- 1804: Isabelle de Portugal ou l'Héritage, historical comedy in 1 act, in prose, by MMs. Étienne and Gaugiran-Nanteuil, Théâtre de l'Impératrice, 27 November
- 1804: Une heure de mariage, comedy in one act and in prose mingled with ariettes, music by Nicolas Dalayrac, created at the Opéra-Comique (théâtre Feydeau), 29 ventôse an XII (20 March)
- 1805: Gulistan ou le Hulla de Samarcande, comedy in three acts and in prose mingled with ariettes, with Poisson de La Chabeaussière after the One Thousand and One Nights, music by Nicolas Dalayrac, creatred at the Opéra-Comique (Théâtre Feydeau), 8 vendémiaire an XIV (30 September)
- 1806: Le Nouveau Réveil d'Épiménide, comédie épisodique in 1 act, in prose, by MM. Étienne and Gaugiran-Nanteuil, Théâtre de l'Impératrice, 5 February
- 1807: Le Carnaval de Beaugency ou Mascarade sur mascarade, comedy in 1 act, in prose, by MM. Étienne and Gaugiran-Nanteuil, Théâtre de l'Impératrice, 2 February
- 1807: Bruis et Palaprat, comedy in 1 act and in verse, Théâtre-Français, 28 November
- 1808: Un jour à Paris ou la Leçon singulière, opéra comique in 3 acts, mingled with music, lyrics by M. Étienne, music by M. Nicolas Isouard, Opéra-comique, 24 May
- 1810: Cendrillon, opéra-féerie in 3 acts and in prose, lyrics by M. Étienne, music by Nicolas Isouard, Opéra-comique, 22 February
- 1810: Les Deux Gendres, comedy in 5 acts and in verse, Théâtre-Français, 11 August
- 1812: Le Chômeur naïf, comedy in 1 act and in prose, Théâtre-Français, 12 May.
- 1813: L'Intrigante ou l'École des familles, comedy in 5 acts and in verse, Théâtre-Français, 6 March
- 1814: L'Oriflamme, opera in 1 act, lyrics by C.-G. Étienne and Baour-Lormian, music by Méhul, Paer, Breton and Kreutzer, Académie impériale de musique, 1 February
- 1814: Joconde ou les Coureurs d'aventures, comedy in 3 acts, mingled with singing, by M. Étienne, music by Nicolo (Nicolas Isouard), Théâtre de l'opéra-comique, 28 February
- 1814: Jeannot et Colin, comedy in 3 acts, mingled with songs, by M. Étienne, music by Nicolo, Théâtre de l'opéra-comique, 17 October
- 1815: Racine et Cavois, comedy in 3 acts and in verse, Théâtre-Français, 26 April
- 1816: Le Rossignol, opéra comique in 1 act, lyrics by C.-G. Étienne, music by Lebrun, Académie royale de musique, 23 April
- 1816: L'Une pour l'autre, opéra comique in 3 acts, by M. Étienne, music by M. Nicolo, Opéra-comique, 11 May
- 1818: Zéloïde ou les Fleurs enchantées, opera in 2 acts, lyrics by C.-G. Étienne, music by Lebrun, Académie royale de musique, 19 January
- 1821: Les Plaideurs sans procès, comedy in 3 acts and in verse, Théâtre-Français, 29 October
- 1822: Aladin ou la Lampe merveilleuse, opéra-féerie in 5 acts, Académie royale de musique, 6 February (music by Nicolo and Benincori)
- 1825: Le Bénéficiaire, comedy in 5 acts and 1 vaudeville, by MM. Théaulon and Étienne, Théâtre des Variétés, 26 April
- 1826: Le Chiffonnier ou le Philosophe nocturne, comédie en vaudeville in 5 acts and in 1 day, by MM. Théaulon et Étienne, Théâtre des Variétés, 6 January
- 1827: Une nuit de Gustave Wasa ou le Batelier suédois, opéra comique in 2 acts, lyrics by J.-M.-C. Leber and C.-G. Étienne, Opéra-comique, 29 September
- 1830: Arwed ou les Représailles, épisode de la guerre d'Amérique, drama in 2 acts, mingled with couplets, by MM. Étienne, Varin and Desvergers, Théâtre du Vaudeville, 31 March

Varia

- 1802: Histoire du Théâtre français depuis le commencement de la Révolution jusqu'à la réunion générale by C. G. Étienne and Alphonse Martainville (2 volumes)
- 1820: Lettres sur Paris ou Correspondance pour servir à l'histoire de l'établissement du gouvernement représentatif en France (2 volumes)
- 1825: Mémoires de François Molé, preceded by a notice about this actor, by M. Étienne. Le Comédien, by M. Remond de Sainte Albine
- 1846–1853: Œuvres (5 volumes)
