= François-Adrien Boieldieu =

French composer (1775–1834)

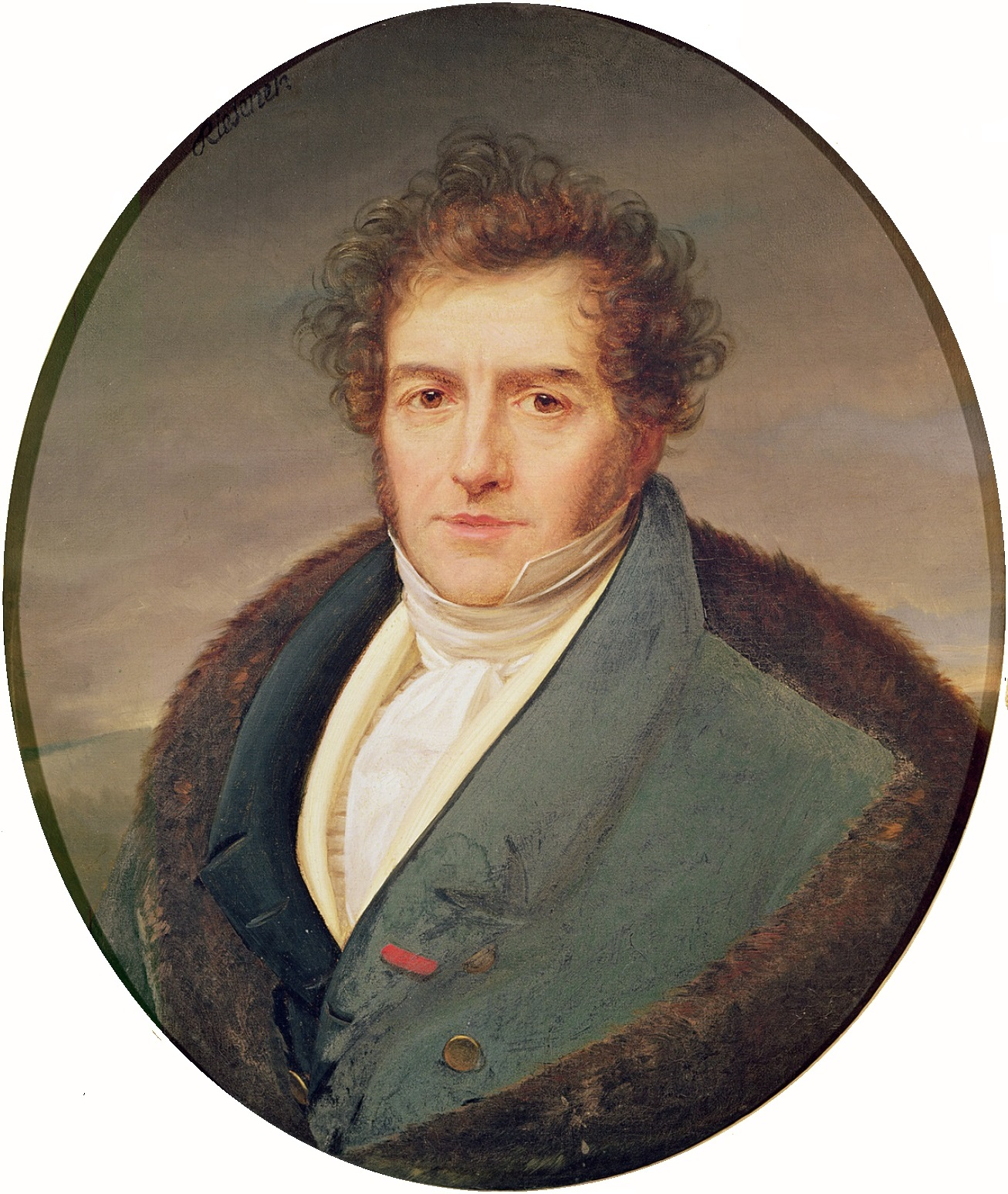
- Born: 16 December 1775; Rouen, France
- Died: 8 October 1834 (aged 58); Varennes-Jarcy, France

François-Adrien Boieldieu (pronounced [fʁɑ̃.swa a.dʁi.(j)ɛ̃ bɔ.jɛl.djø], also [bwa(.ɛ)l.djø]) (16 December 1775 – 8 October 1834) was a French composer, mainly of operas, often called "the French Mozart". Although his reputation is largely based upon his operas, Boieldieu composed other works and among them, his Harp Concerto in C (1800–1801) is a masterpiece of the harp repertory.

== Biography ==
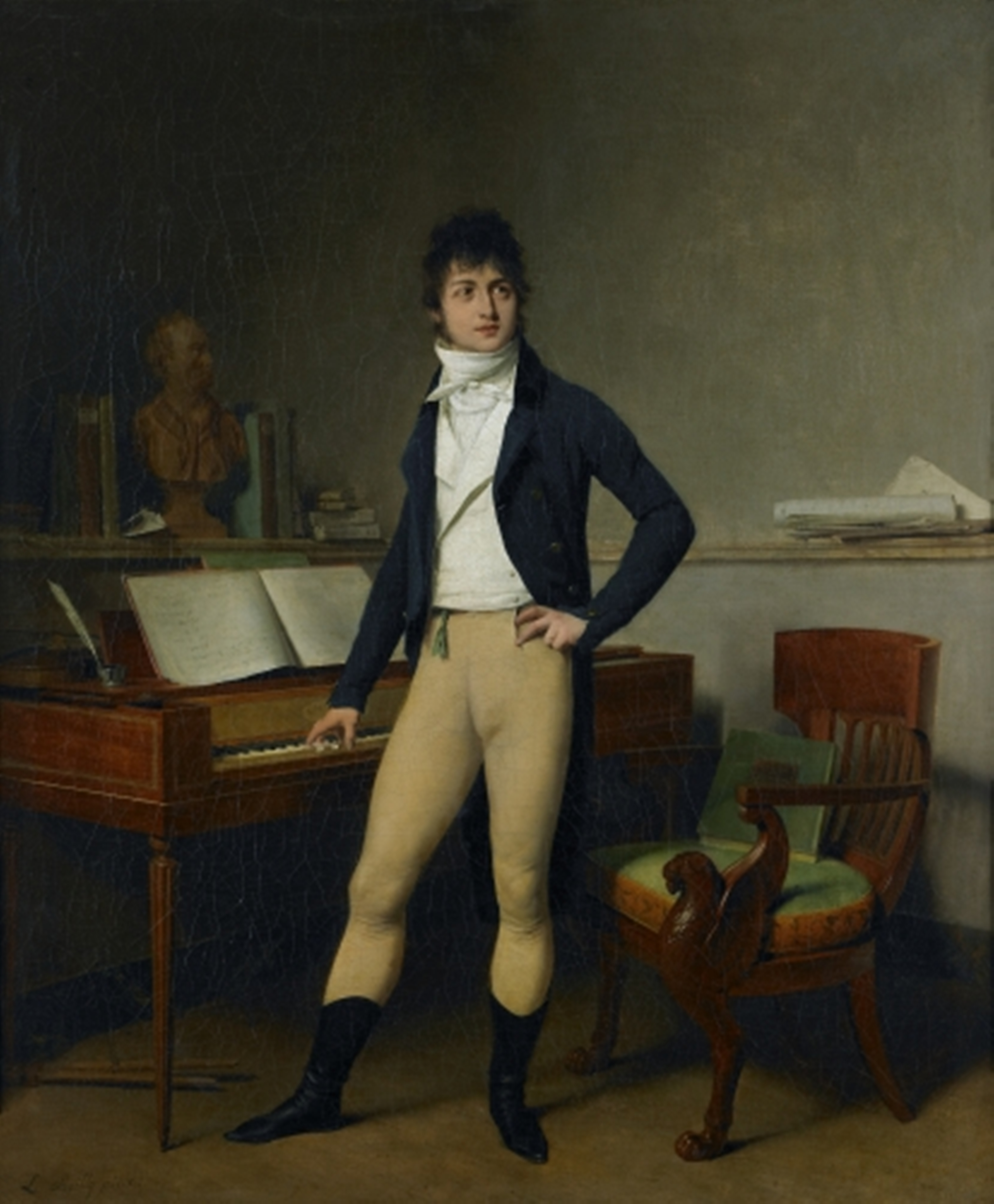
Boieldieu by Louis Léopold Boilly, circa 1800 (Musée de Rouen)

=== Early life ===
François-Adrien Boieldieu was born in Rouen. His date of birth was given as December 15 by his biographer Lucien Augé de Lassus and as September 15 by some local press releases. He received his musical education first from the choirmaster and then from the organist of the local cathedral. During the Reign of Terror, Rouen was one of the few towns to maintain a significant musical life and in 1793, a series of concerts was organised that featured the celebrated violinist Pierre Rode and the tenor Pierre-Jean Garat. It was during this time that Boieldieu composed his earliest works to texts written by his father (La fille coupable in 1793, followed by Rosalie et Mirza in 1795). These works brought him immediate success.

=== Career ===
During the Revolutionary period, Boieldieu left for Paris and wisely started work as a piano tuner. At this time, the Opéra-Comique was the only theatre to offer opportunities for the hybrid works of the same name, close to classic opera, but containing spoken dialogue. The most typical work of the genre was Luigi Cherubini's Médée (1797). Traditionally performed at the Salle Favart, Opéra-comique was staged at the Théâtre de Monsieur from 1789. In 1791, the company set up home in a new theatre, the Théâtre Feydeau, previously reserved for the troupe of the opera buffa.

Throughout the course of ten years, the Favart and the Feydeau companies were rivals, the Favart beefing up its repertoire of patriotic spectacles and presenting the lighter works of Étienne Méhul, the Feydeau offering the heroic dramas of Cherubini or Jean-François Le Sueur. In 1797, Boieldieu offered the Feydeau La famille suisse and L'heureuse nouvelle. In 1798, he presented the Favart with Zoraime et Zulmare, which brought him extraordinary success.

F-A Boieldieu Overture from the Caliph de Bagdad (1809) played on a fortepiano

The spiritual heir of André Grétry, Boieldieu focused on melodies that avoided too much ornamentation, set to light, but intelligent, orchestration. Hector Berlioz described his music as possessing "a pleasing and tasteful Parisian elegance". He was appointed as second class professor of piano in 1798. In 1800, he achieved a veritable triumph with Le calife de Bagdad (The Caliph of Baghdad).

Following the breakdown of his marriage to the dancer Clotilde Mafleuroy, he set off for Saint Petersburg in 1804 to take up the post of court composer to the Russian tsar, where he stayed until 1810. There he composed nine operas, including Aline, reine de Golconde (1804) and Les voitures versées (1808).

On his return to France he won back Parisian audiences with La jeune femme en colère (1811), Jean de Paris (1812), Le nouveau seigneur du village (1813), and a dozen other works. In 1817, he succeeded Méhul as one of the forty members of the Académie des Beaux-Arts. He became professor of composition at the Paris Conservatoire in 1820. He also received the Légion d'honneur in 1820.

In 1825, he produced his operatic masterpiece, La dame blanche (revived in the Salle Favart in 1997 and recorded by the conductor Marc Minkowski). Unusual for the time, La dame blanche was based on episodes from two novels by Walter Scott. The libretto by Eugène Scribe is built around the theme of the long-lost child fortunately recognized at a moment of peril. The style of the opera influenced Lucia di Lammermoor, I puritani, and La jolie fille de Perth. La dame blanche was one of the early attempts to introduce the fantastic into opera.

=== Later life ===
He gradually lost the ability to speak, likely due to cancer of the larynx. The bankruptcy of the Opéra-Comique and the revolution of 1830 added to his woes. To save him from poverty, Adolphe Thiers awarded him a state pension of 6,000 francs. On September 25, 1834, he made his last public appearance at the premiere of Adolphe Adam's Le chalet. In this way, he stylishly passed on the baton to his brilliant pupil.

Boieldieu died in Varennes-Jarcy. On 13 November 1834 his heart was interred in Rouen, in a tomb paid for by that city and designed by Charles Isabelle, while his body was interred in Père Lachaise Cemetery in Paris.

=== Personal life ===
The composer (Adrien) Louis (Victor) Boïeldieu was his son with Thérèse Louise Antoinette Regnault, the French opera singer and member of the Opéra-Comique who is known under the name Antoinette Lemonnier.

He was a freemason, initiated at the Parisian lodge Les Arts et l'Amitié ('Arts and Friendship') – belonging to the Grand Orient of France, – as well as having been a member of the lodge 'Palestine' (in St. Petersburg), and an honorary member of the lodge 'Les Amis Réunis' ('Friends Re-united'), also in St. Petersburg.

== See also ==
- List of compositions by François-Adrien Boieldieu
- List of operas by François-Adrien Boieldieu
- List of compositions for harp
- Classic 100 Music of France (ABC)
