= Nicolas Isouard =

Maltese composer (1773–1818)

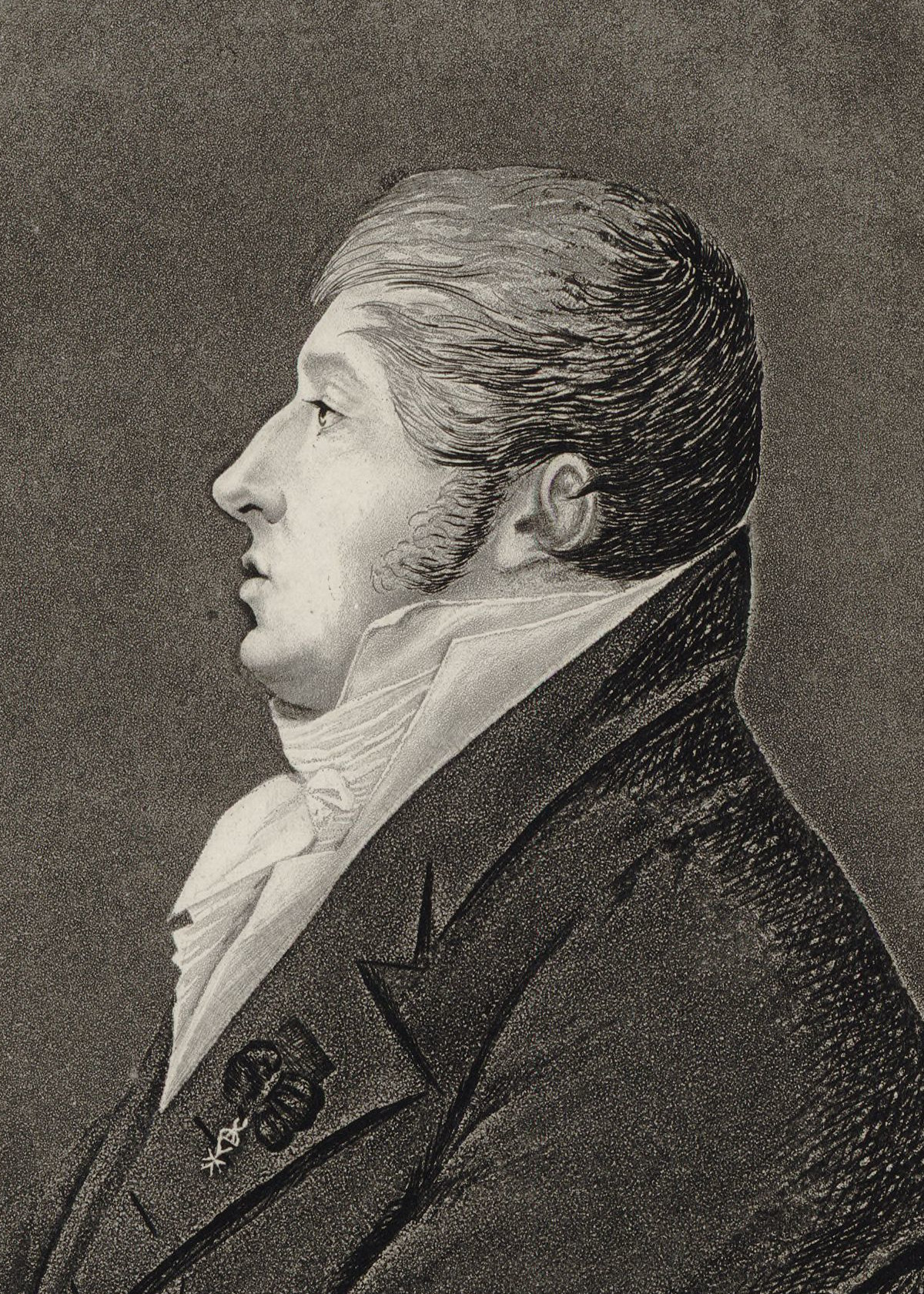
Nicolas Isouard

Nicolas Isouard (French pronunciation: [nikɔla izwaʁ]; also known as Nicolò, Nicolò Isoiar or Nicolò de Malte; 18 May 1773 – 23 March 1818) was a Franco-Maltese composer.

== Biography ==
Born in Valletta, Malta, Isouard studied in Rabat or Mdina with Francesco Azopardi, in Palermo with Giuseppe Amendola, and in Naples with Nicola Sala and Pietro Alessandro Guglielmi. From 1795 he was organist at St John's Co-Cathedral - the Conventual Church of the Order of Saint John in Valletta

He moved to Paris, where he worked as a free composer and became friends with Rodolphe Kreutzer. The pair worked together on several operas, including Le Petit page, ou La Prison d'état (1800) and Flaminius à Corinthe (1801). Isouard adopted the pseudonym Nicolò (or Nicolò de Malte) and found rapid success in the field of opéra comique with Michel-Ange (1802) and L'Intrigue aux fenêtres (1805). He composed regularly for the Théâtre de l'Opéra-Comique, writing some thirty works for the theatre.

He composed masses, motets, cantatas, romances, and duos, along with over 45 operas.

== Family and legacy ==
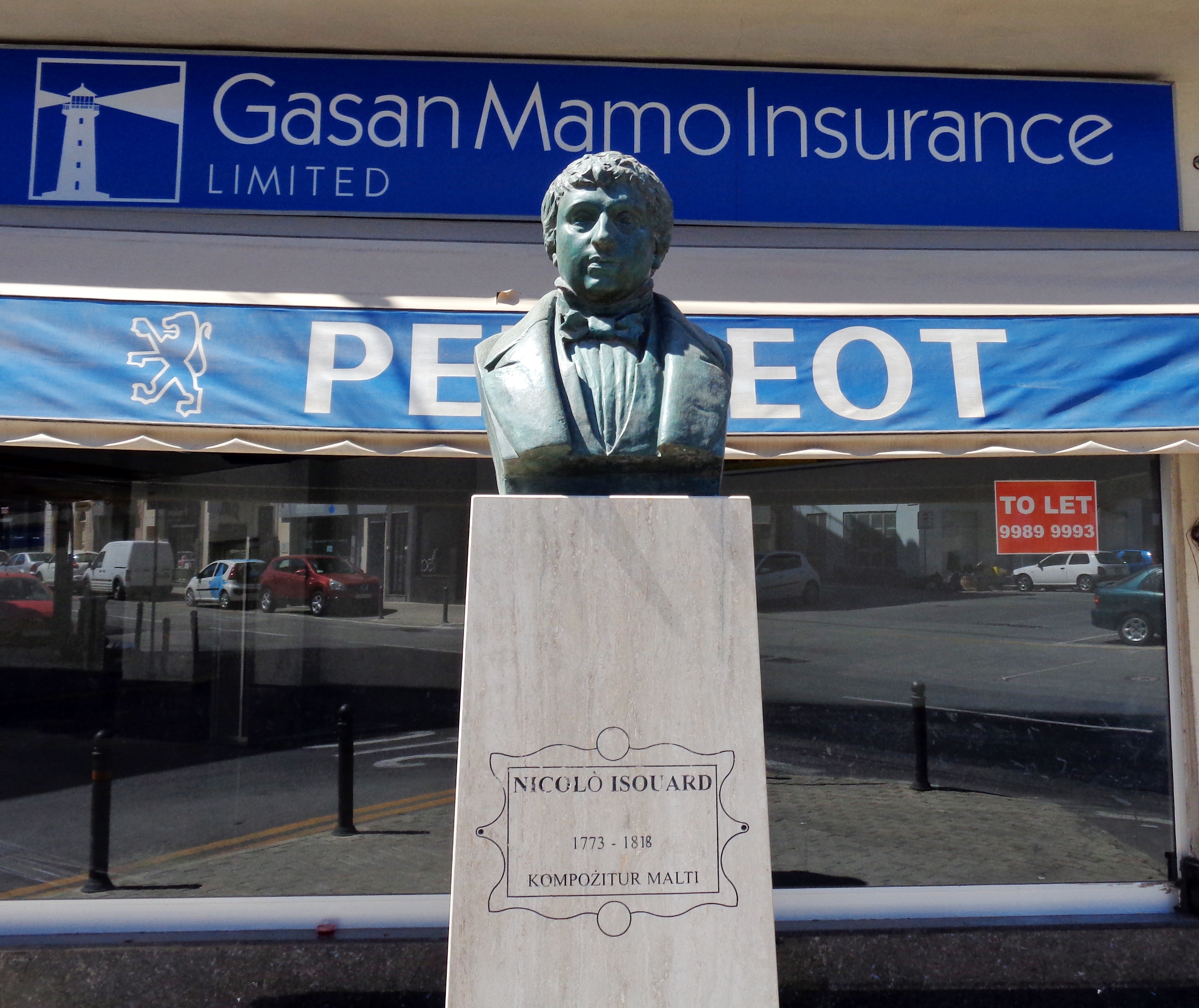
Nicolò Isouard bust in Mosta

Isouard had two daughters, Sophie-Nicole (1809–1885), a composer of romances, and Annette-Julie (1814–1876), a pianist and composer. His brother Joseph (1794–1863) had a career as a singer and opera director before being named inspector of historic monuments in Rouen. Nicolas Isouard died in Paris and was buried in Notre-Dame-des-Victoires but was later moved to Division 12 at Père-Lachaise.

A bust of the composer was placed on one of the facades of both the Théâtre de l'Opéra-Comique and the Palais Garnier, and one of the main squares in Paris was given his name.

== Works ==
- Casaciello, perseguitato da un Mago, Opera buffa - Two-act comedy 1793, Malta
- L'avviso a Maritati, Opera, Florence June 1794
- Artaserse, re di Persia, Opera seria, Livorno August 1794. Two excerpts only survive. Edited by Richard Divall
- Il barbiere di Siviglia, Opera buffa after Pierre Beaumarchais, Malta Teatro Manoel 1796
- Rinaldo d'Asti, Dramma giocoso, Malta 1796
- L'improvvisata in campagna, Opera buffa, Malta 1796-7
- I due avari, Commedia per musica, Malta 1797
- Il bottaio, Opera comique, 1798
- Il barone d'Alba chiara, Commedia per musica, Carnevale, Malta 1798
- Ginevra di Scozia, Dramma serio eroico, 1798
- Le Petit page, ou La Prison d'état, Opera, Paris, February 1801
- Flaminius à Corinthe, Opera, Paris February 1801
- Le Tonellier Opera-comique, Paris May 1801
- L'Impromptu de campagne, Opera-comique, Paris June 1801
- La Statue, ou La Femme avare, Opera comique, 1802
- Michel-Ange, Opera, 1802
- Les Confidences, Opera, 1803
- Le Baiser et la quittance, ou Une Aventure de garnison, Opera comique, 1803
- Le Médecin turc, Opéra bouffon, 1803
- L'Intrigue aux fenêtres, Opera, 1805
- La Ruse inutile, ou Les Rivaux par convention, Opera, 1805
- Léonce, ou Le Fils adoptif, Opera, 1805
- La Prise de Passaw, Opera comique, 1806
- Le Déjeuner de garçons, Comédie mêlée de musique, 1806
- Idala, ou La Sultane, Opera comique, 1806
- Les Rendez-vous bourgeois, Opéra bouffon, 1807
- Les Créanciers, ou Le Remède à la goutte, Opera comique, 1807
- Un Jour à Paris, ou La Leçon singulière, Opera comique, 1808
- Cimarosa, Opera comique, 1808
- Zélomir, ou L'Intrigue au sérail, Opera comique, 1809
- Cendrillon, Opéra féerie after Charles Perrault, 1810
- La Victime des arts, ou La Fête de famille, Opera comique, 1811
- La Fête de village, ou L'Heureux militaire, Opera comique, 1811
- Le Billet de loterie, Opera comique, 1811
- Le Magicien sans magie, Opera comique, 1811
- Lulli et Quinault, ou Le Déjeuner impossible, Opera comique, 1812
- Le Prince de Catane, ou Alamon, Opera, 1813
- Le Français à Venise, Opera comique, 1813
- Bayard à Mézières, ou Le Siège de Mézières, Opera comique, 1814
- Joconde, ou Les Coureurs d'aventures, Opera comique, 1814
- Jeannot et Colin, Opera comique, 1814
- Les Deux maris, Opera comique, 1816
- L'Une pour l'autre, ou L'Enlèvement, Opera comique, 1816
- Les Deux capitaines de hussards Opera comique, Paris, March 1817
- Aladin, ou La Lampe merveilleuse, Opéra féerie, 1822
- Une Nuit de Gustave Wasa, Opera, 1825

Sacred works - all with orchestra and voices (In alphabetical order). Original Manuscripts - Bibliothèque Nationale, Paris

- Angelus Domini
- Credo Leg a 4 Voci 1795
- De torrente in A flat major
- De torrente in B flat major
- Diffusa est Gratia
- Dixit Dominus a 4
- Dixit Dominus Leg
- Dominus Deus a Terzetto
- Gloria in D
- Gratia agimus tibi in E flat
- Gloria Patri in E flat
- Kyrie in E flat
- Kyrie in C minor
- Kyrie Messa no 2 in E flat - fragment
- Juravit Dominus
- Lauda Jerusalem
- Laetatus sum
- Magnificat
- Missa a Quattro Voci 1790 ( attr. to another composer) Cospicua Archives
- Missa Pro Defunctorum - Jommelli, orchestrated by Isouard (Brussels Conservatoire Library)
- Nisi Dominus
- Panis Angelicus
- Qui Tollis
- Quoniam Tu Solus
- Salve Regina
- Sinfonia in C minor
- Stabat Mater (5 fragments) Suscepimus Deus
- Te Deum 1791
- Vexilla Regis
- Virgam Virtutis for tenor and bass duet
- Virgam Virtutis for solo tenor
- Virtute Magna

All of the above have been edited by Richard Divall and are available from the University of Divinity, Australia. Richard Divall is currently preparing a publication of a monograph and complete thematic catalogue, and an edition of the opera Cendrillon.
