= Augustine Albert =

French opera singer

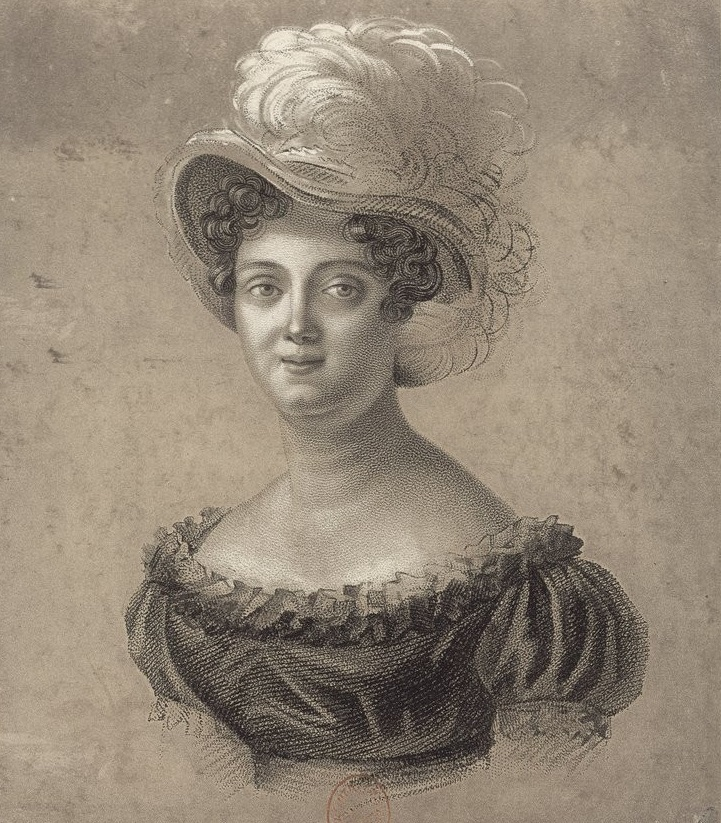
- Born: Louise-Marguerite-Augustine Himm; 28 August 1791; Paris, France
- Died: 16 May 1867 (aged 75); Paris, France
- Occupation: Opera singer (soprano)
- Spouse: Albert (François Decombe)

Augustine Albert, also known as Augustine Albert-Himm (28 August 1791 – 16 May 1867), was a French opera singer who sang leading soprano roles at the Paris Opéra from 1806 to 1823. Amongst the many roles she created in their world premieres was the title role of Spontini's Olimpie. Born in Paris and trained at the Conservatoire de Paris, she was also a principal singer of the Chapelle royale until 1830. She was married to Albert, danseur noble of the Paris Opéra.

== Life and career ==
Albert was born Louise-Marguerite-Augustine Himm (Note: Her birth surname is sometimes spelled "Hymme" and less commonly, "Hymm" or "Hym".) in Paris. She entered the Conservatoire de Paris in 1803 where she was a pupil of Charles-Henri Plantade. The following year she received the conservatory's first prize in singing and later studied with the castrato singer Girolamo Crescentini. She first appeared at the Paris Opéra in 1803 at the age of 12 as L'Amour (Cupid) in Cherubini's Anacréon. However, her official debut there came in 1806 when she sang Antigone in Sacchini's Œdipe à Colone.

She went on to sing in the world premieres of multiple operas and also appeared in the leading soprano roles of many others, including Julia in La Vestale, Amazily in Fernand Cortez, and Eurydice in Orphée et Eurydice. After her marriage in 1811 to the dancer Albert, she performed under the name Augustine Albert. The couple had two children, a son Alexander, and a daughter Elisa, both of whom became dancers of some note but never achieved the fame of their father.

For many years Albert was also a principal singer in the Chapelle royale of Louis XVIII and later Charles X. She retired from the Paris Opéra in 1823 but continued as a singer of the Chapelle royale until 1830 when she retired to Versailles. In 1846 she was mentioned as one of the artists receiving pensions from the Paris Opéra in L'Album de Sainte-Cécile. She died in Paris on 16 May 1867.

== Roles created ==
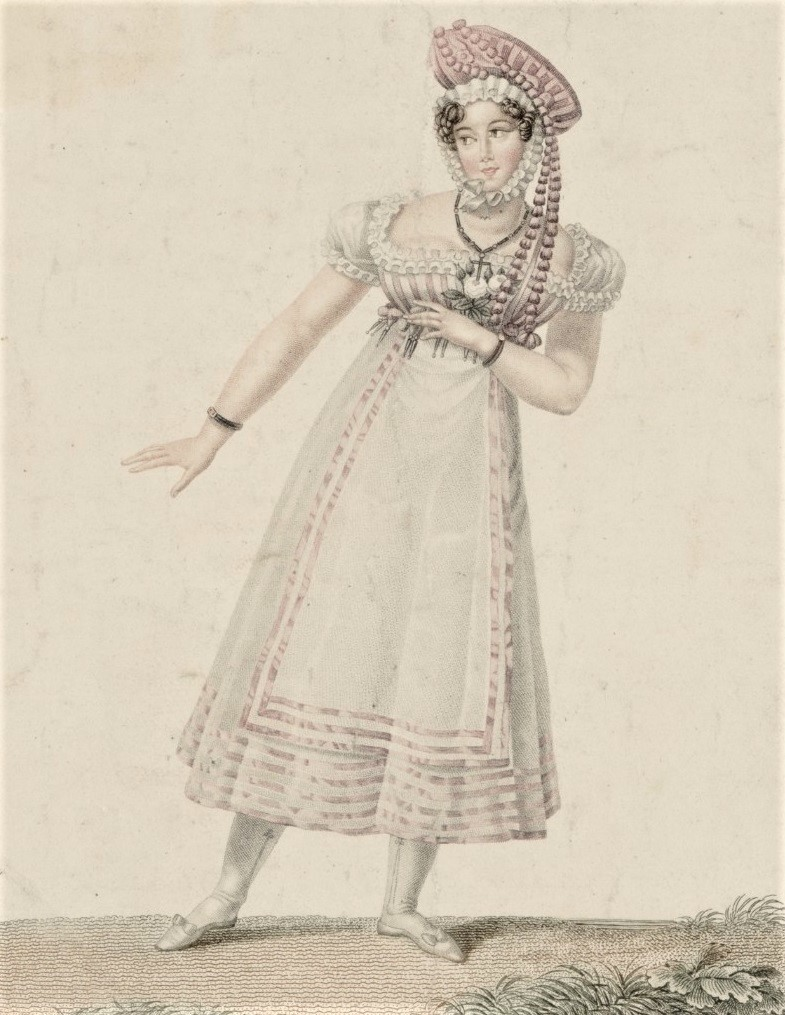
Albert as Philis in Le Rossignol

Roles created by Albert in their world premieres include:

- L'Amour in Anacréon (opéra-ballet in 2 acts) composed by Luigi Cherubini, libretto by C.R. Mendouze, premiered Paris Opéra, 4 October 1803
- Galatea in Pimmalione (opera in 1 act) composed by Luigi Cherubini, libretto by Stefano Vestris; premiered Tuileries Palace, 30 November 1809 (Note: The premiere was a private performance attended by Napoleon, who had commissioned the work. The title role was taken by Girolamo Crescentini, Albert's former teacher and a great favourite of the emperor. Venus was sung by Giuseppina Grassini, another of Napoleon's favourites.)
- Méala in Abel (opera in 3 acts) composed by Rodolphe Kreutzer, libretto by François-Benoît Hoffman; premiered Paris Opéra, 23 March 1810
- Ériphile in Les amazones (opera in 3 acts) composed by Étienne Méhul, libretto by Étienne de Jouy; premiered Paris Opéra, 17 December 1811
- Elvine in Pélage, ou Le roi et la paix (opera in 2 acts) composed by Gaspare Spontini, libretto by Étienne de Jouy; premiered Paris Opéra, 23 August 1814
- Philis in Le Rossignol (opéra comique in 1 act) composed by Louis-Sébastien Lebrun, libretto by Charles-Guillaume Étienne; premiered Paris Opéra, 23 April 1816
- Thémis and La Renommée in Les dieux rivaux ou Les fêtes de Cythère (opéra-ballet in 1 act) jointly composed by Berton, Kreutzer, Loiseau de Persuis and Spontini, libretto by Charles Brifaut and Armand-Michel Dieulafoy; premiered Paris Opéra, 21 June 1816 to mark the marriage of the Duke of Berry)
- Zirphile in Zirphile et Fleur de Myrte (opéra-féerie in 2 acts) composed by Charles-Simon Catel, libretto by Étienne de Jouy; premiered Paris Opéra, 29 June 1818
- Olimpie in Olimpie (opera in 3 acts) composed by Gaspare Spontini, libretto by Charles Brifaut and Armand-Michel Dieulafoy; premiered Paris Opéra, 22 December 1819
