= Les bayadères =

Opera by Charles-Simon Catel

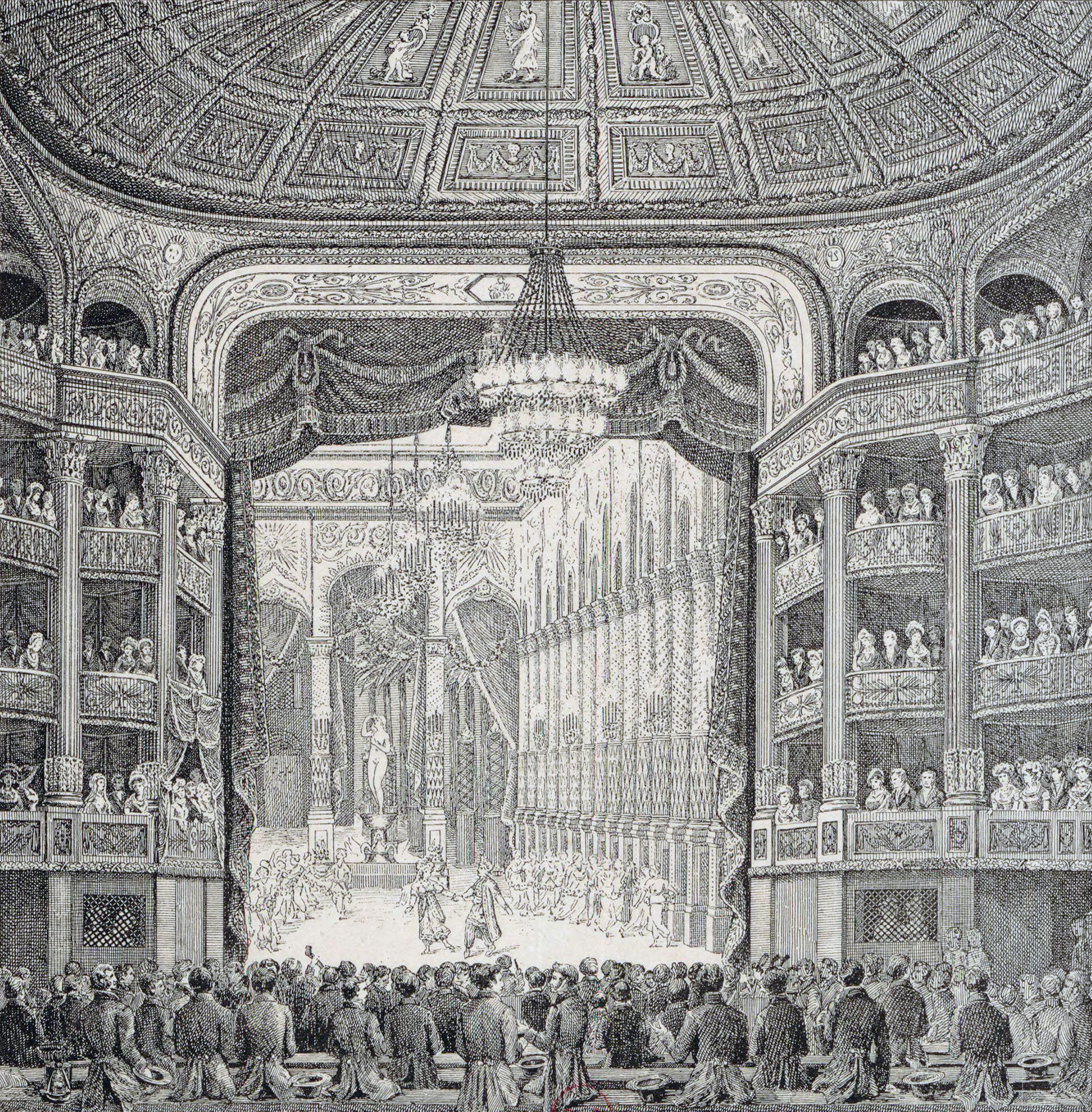
Performance of Les bayadères in 1821 for the inauguration of the Salle Le Peletier in Paris

Les bayadères is an opera in three acts by the composer Charles-Simon Catel. The French-language libretto, by Victor-Joseph Étienne de Jouy, is based on Voltaire's story L'education d'un prince. It was first performed on 8 August 1810 by the Paris Opéra at the Théâtre des Arts with the famous soprano Caroline Branchu in the lead role of Laméa. Les bayadères was Catel's most popular opera.

== Performance history ==
The success of the work was helped by a first-rate cast and the luxury of the spectacle. Among the star singers were Madame Branchu, Henri-Étienne Dérivis and Louis Nourrit. The dancers included Émilie Bigottini and Pierre Gardel. By the end of the third act, 130 performers were on stage. Arthur Pougin calculated that the whole production cost 150,000 francs, including 90,000 francs on costumes, a considerable sum for the day. Jean-Baptiste Rey was due to conduct, but he died in July. His replacement was Louis-Luc Loiseau de Persuis.

Later revivals were often in a reduced, two-act version, first performed on 21 June 1814. A staging of Les bayadères in its original three acts was chosen to mark the inauguration of the Paris Opéra's new home, the Salle Le Peletier, on 16 August 1821.

== Libretto and music: a transitional work ==
Les bayadères is an important transitional work in the tradition of operas on Oriental themes. In the 18th-century, these tended to be set in the Middle East and were usually comic in spirit. Examples include Mozart's Die Entführung aus dem Serail and Grétry's La caravane du Caire. As the 19th century progressed, French Oriental operas moved further eastwards, especially to South Asia, with works such as Bizet's Les pêcheurs de perles and Delibes' Lakmé. These were generally more emotional than comic and Les bayadères, set in India and with a serious plot, is an obvious forerunner.

Les bayadères also marks a stage towards the creation of French Grand Opera. It shares many features with another work set to a libretto by Jouy, Spontini's La vestale (1807), the greatest operatic success of the Napoleonic era. Like La vestale, the heroine of Les bayadères has taken a religious vow of perpetual chastity. The choice of an historical subject, the sumptuous sets and the many opportunities for dance were all features of La vestale too, as they would be of the Grand Opera which appeared in France in the late 1820s and dominated the repertoire of the 19th century.

Catel was a great admirer of Mozart, whose The Magic Flute had been staged in France in 1801. and the music of Les bayadéres reflects this. Gérard Condé describes the score as "a rare example in the French repertoire of an opera that assimilates the Mozartian style as a means of toning down the brazenness and sterility of neo-Gluckism." Nevertheless, Les bayadères too shows the influence of Gluck. Its heroine, Laméa, resembles Gluck's Iphigénie (in both Iphigénie en Aulide and Iphigénie en Tauride).

== Roles ==
Cast	Voice type	Premiere
Démaly, Rajah of Benares	tenor	Louis Nourrit
Olkar, general of the Mahrattas	bass	Henri-Étienne Dérivis
Rustan, intendant of the rajah's harem	tenor	Laforêt
Narséa, the High Brahmin	bass	Jean-Honoré Bertin (né Bertin Dilloy)
Rutrem, minister to the rajah	tenor	Casimir Éloy (or Éloi)
Salem, Olkar's confidant	bass	Duparc
Hyderam, a Brahmin	bass	Jean-Honoré Bertin (né Bertin Dilloy)
Laméa, principal bayadere	soprano	Rose-Timoléone-Caroline Chevalier de Lavit, called Mme Branchu
Inora, Divané, Dévéda, the rajah's favourites	sopranos	Jeanart, Joséphine Armand, Émilie Benoist
Three bayaderes	sopranos	Lucy Portes, Percillier (junior), Reine

== Synopsis ==
Time: 1682
Place: Benares
Act 1

Démaly, the rajah of the holy city of Benares, is in love with Laméa. Unfortunately, Laméa is a bayadere, a holy dancer for the god Brahma and she is forbidden from marrying. Démaly will be forced to take a bride from within the royal harem. Before he can make a decision, Benares is attacked by the Mahratta general Olkar, who captures the city and throws Démaly into prison.

Act 2

Olkar wants to seize the diadem of Vishnu, the great treasure of Benares, but Démaly refuses to say where it is hidden. Olkar places Laméa in Démaly's prison cell, hoping she will lure him into revealing the location. Instead, she tells Démaly that an army of rescuers is on its way from Ellabad. The bayaderes also have a plan to trick the Mahrattas. She tells Olkar she knows where the diadem is but will only bring it to him after a victory celebration in Benares. The festivities take place and the bayaderes lull the Mahrattas with their dancing and intoxicating drinks and secretly take away their weapons. Laméa now gives the signal for the rescuing army to attack. Led by Démaly, who has been freed from prison, they defeat the Mahrattas.

Act 3

Laméa still refuses to break her vow and marry Démaly. News comes that Démaly has been struck by a poisoned arrow and is dying. The Brahmin Hyderam says that the rajah must marry immediately and his wife must die on the funeral pyre with him. Démaly volunteers to accept this sacrifice and prepares for the funeral. Démaly appears, safe and sound. Laméa still will not marry him, until Hyderam releases her from her religious vows, saying the god Vishnu once married a bayadere. The opera ends with the wedding celebrations.

== Recording ==
- Les bayadères Chantal Santon, Philippe Do, André Heyboer, Mathias Vidal, Solamente Naturali/Musica Florea, National Bulgarian Choir Svetoslav Obretenov, conducted by Didier Talpain (Ediciones Singulares, 2014)

== Sources ==
- Original libretto: Les Bayadères, Opéra en trois actes, représenté pour la première fois sur le Théatre de l'Académie Impériale de Musique, le 8 aout 1810 (second edition), Paris, Marchands de Nouveautés, 1810 (accessible for free online as a Google ebook-gratis)
- Essays in the book accompanying the Talpain recording by Gérard Condé and Didier Talpain
- Holden, Amanda (ed.) The Viking Opera Guide (Viking, 1993)
- Pougin, Arthur: introduction to the 1881 edition of Les bayadères (available online at Archive.org)
