= La mort d'Abel =

French composer Rodolphe Kreutzer

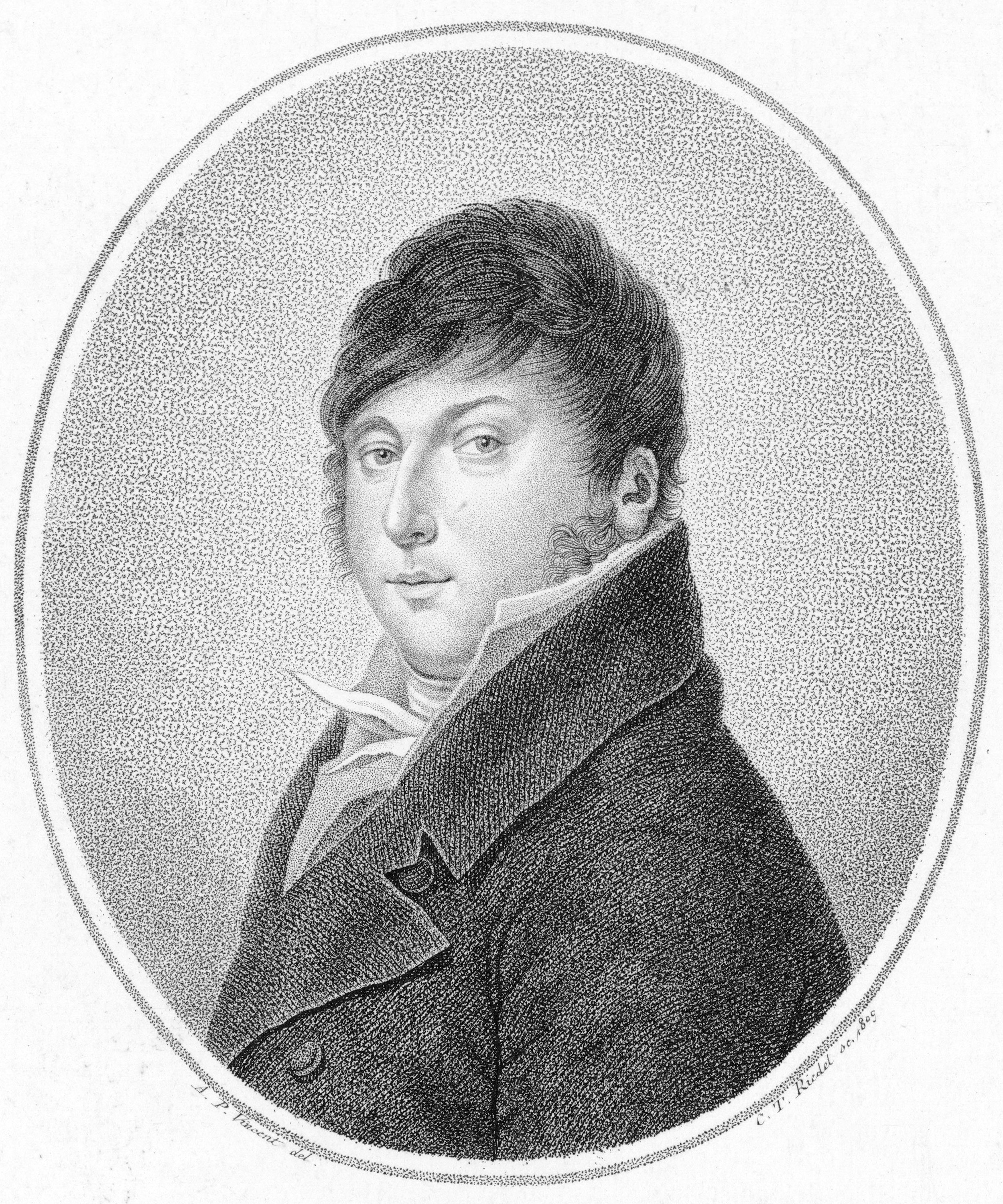
Rodolphe Kreutzer

La mort d'Abel (The Death of Abel) is an opera by the French composer Rodolphe Kreutzer. The libretto, by François-Benoît Hoffman, deals with the Biblical story of Cain and Abel. It was first performed in a three-act version at the Salle Montansier by the Académie Impériale de Musique (the Paris Opéra) on 23 March 1810 under the title Abel. A revival at the Salle Le Peletier in 1823, in which the second act was cut, impressed the young Hector Berlioz.

== Background ==
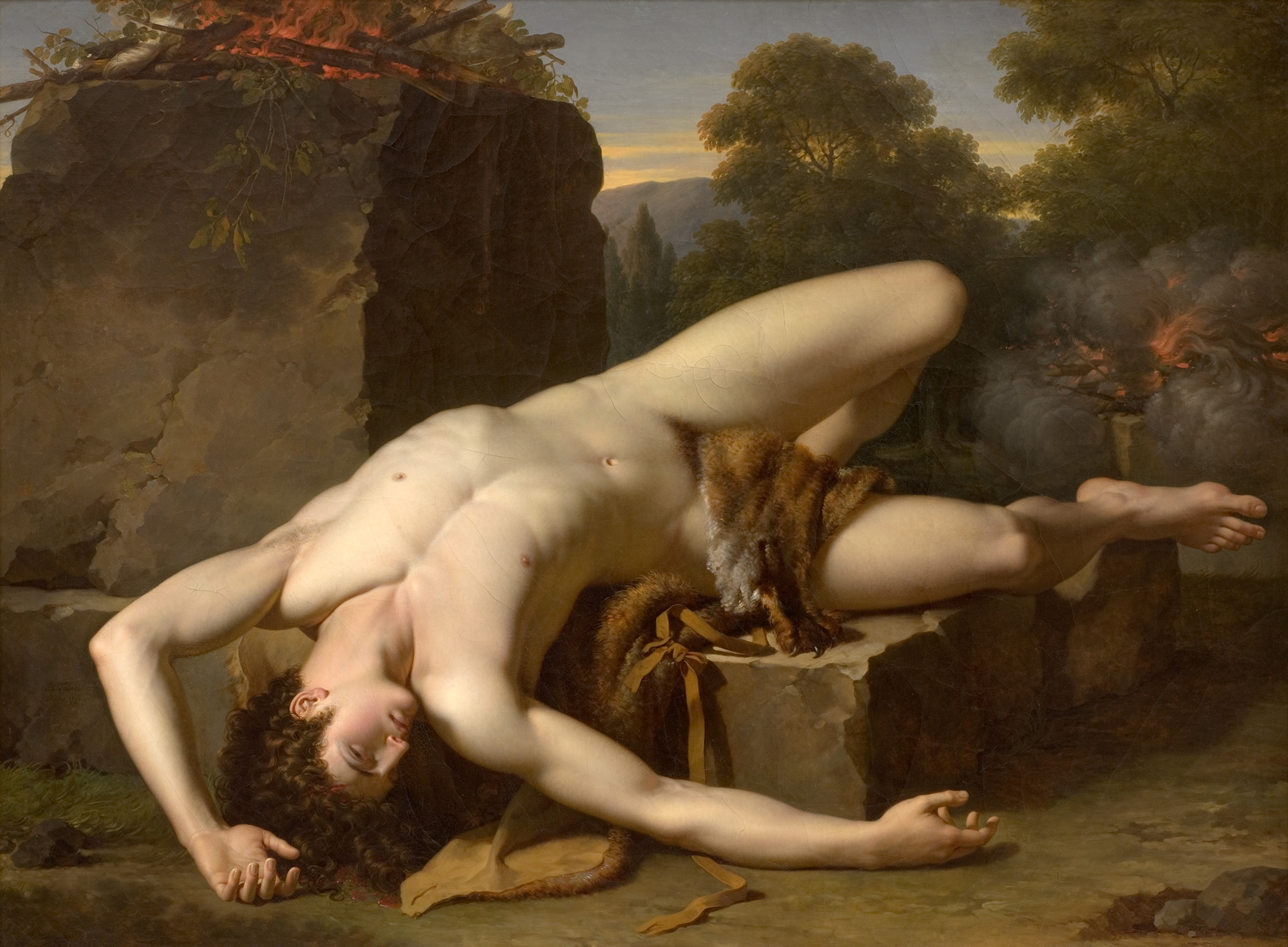
La mort d'Abel (1791) by the contemporary French painter François-Xavier Fabre

La mort d'Abel was one of a number of French operas and oratorios on Biblical themes to appear in the first decades of the 19th century. This fashion was inspired by a performance of Haydn's The Creation at the Paris Opéra in 1800. Examples of the genre include Kalkbrenner's staged oratorios Saul and La prise de Jéricho, Lesueur's La mort d'Adam and, most famously, Méhul's Joseph (1807).

The French Emperor Napoleon did not share the enthusiasm for putting Bible stories on stage, regarding any potential offence to religious sensibilities as a threat to the understanding he had reached with the Catholic Church. The only reason he allowed the premiere of La mort d'Abel to go ahead was because so much money had already been spent on rehearsals. However, he warned the superintendent of the Opéra, "Henceforth, no opera shall be given without my order."

Hoffman based his libretto on the play Der Tod Abels (1758) by the Swiss poet Salomon Gessner, but added elements derived from the Hell scenes of Milton's Paradise Lost.

== Performance history and reception ==
La mort d'Abel first appeared at the Paris Opéra in a three-act version on 23 March 1810. Its success was overshadowed by the immense contemporary popularity of two works by Gaspare Spontini, La vestale (1807) and Fernand Cortez (1809). Hoffman, the librettist, also blamed the muted audience response on underhanded behaviour by the authors of a rival Biblical opera, La mort d'Adam, which had appeared the previous year. Hoffman claimed that he had submitted the libretto for La mort d'Abel to the management of the Théâtre Feydeau in 1794. A few years later, he had shown the unpublished text to his fellow composer Jean-François Lesueur. Lesueur and his librettist Nicolas-François Guillard had then added elements from it to their own opera La mort d'Adam (including Abel and the demons). Hoffman was particularly unhappy that they had borrowed the idea of the "apotheosis", when the heavens open in the finale. Hoffman had intended this to be a spectacular coup de théâtre. Because La mort d'Adam had reached the stage a year before La mort d'Abel, the novelty was lost and it now looked as though Hoffman and Kreutzer were the plagiarists rather than Guillard and Lesueur.

Reviewers of the premiere praised the music of acts 1 and 3, but criticised act 2, set entirely in Hell. They blamed the librettist for a lack of internal variety in this act, comparing it unfavourably with the depiction of the underworld in Gluck's Orfeo ed Euridice.

The Opéra revived La mort d'Abel on 17 March 1823, this time in a version which omitted the heavily criticised second act. The revival received little critical notice in newspapers and journals, but it provoked the young Hector Berlioz to write an exceptionally enthusiastic letter to Kreutzer, beginning, "O genius! I succumb! I die! Tears choke me!"

== Roles ==
Cast	Voice type	Premiere, 23 March 1810	Revised version, 17 March 1823
Abel	tenor	Louis Nourrit	Adolphe Nourrit
Caïn	tenor	Étienne Lainez	Louis Nourrit
Adam	bass	Henri-Étienne Dérivis	Ferdinand Prévôt
Ève	soprano	Madame Maillard (Marie-Thérèse Davoux)	Alexandrine-Caroline Branchu
Méala, wife of Cain	soprano	Augustine Albert (née Himm)	Augustine Albert
Tirsa, wife of Abel	soprano	Madame Émélie	Constance Jawureck
An angel	soprano	Madame Lucy	Mlle Thomassin
Anamalech, a demon	bass	Duparc	?
Satan, a demon	bass	Jean-Honoré Bertin	(character not in revised version)
Moloc, a demon	?	Alexandre	(character not in revised version)
Béelzébuth, a demon	taille	Martin	(character not in revised version)
Bélial, a demon	tenor	Casimir Eloi (or Eloy)	(character not in revised version)

== Synopsis (revised version) ==
=== Act 1 ===
Scene: A pleasant picturesque site

After a long overture depicting night and dawn, the curtain opens on Adam, lamenting the quarrel between his sons Cain and Abel (Aria: "Charmant séjour, lieux solitaires"). No matter how hard he tries, he cannot reconcile the jealous Cain to his brother. Abel arrives and joins Adam in a prayer hoping that Cain will soon change his mind (Duet: "Unissons-nous pour le rendre sensible"). Eve is also worried about her son, who has taken to spending his days alone in the forest (Aria: "Insensible aux tourments"). Cain's wife Méala is concerned about their children (Aria: "J'attendais que l'aurore en ramenant le jour"). Cain enters and accuses Adam of favouring his brother (Aria: "Quoi! toujours ton image est offerte à mes yeux"). But the united pleas of his family finally persuade him to accept reconciliation with his brother (Sextet with chorus: "Ô moment plein de charmes"). However, even as the two brothers swear friendship, a voice is heard crying "Never!" It is the demon Anamalech, jealous of the happiness of the humans. To avert the curse, the brothers decide to sacrifice to God on their altars. Abel's sacrifice receives a favourable omen, but Anamalech overthrows Cain's altar. Feeling his brother has been accepted and he has been rejected, Cain curses everyone and runs off to the wilderness.

=== Act 2 ===
Scene: A wild, arid spot

In despair, Cain prays for the gift of sleep (Aria: "Ô doux sommeil"). Anamalech gives the sleeping Cain a vision of the future in which Abel's children will be happy and Cain's will suffer (Scene: "Tu dors, Caïn, tu dors"). He leaves Cain with an iron club, forged in Hell (the club is introduced with blows on an untuned anvil in the orchestra). Cain wakes, full of rage (Aria: "Tremble, indigne frère"). Abel arrives and tries to persuade his brother to return to his family. Cain, struggling with conflicting feelings, urges his brother to leave (Duet: "Cède à l'amitié d'un frère"). A violent storm arises and Cain strikes Abel dead with the club, before running off. Adam and the others enter and find Abel's body (Scene: "Nous approchons de lui"). Initially, they think he is sleeping but Adam realises this is the first death in the world. Cain re-enters, racked with guilt, and admits the crime. He is driven to madness and flees to the mountains, followed by his wife and children. A chorus of angels appear and carry Abel off to Heaven (Chorus: "Viens dans le sein de l'inno-cence").

== Recording ==
- La mort d'Abel (1823 version), Sébastien Droy (Abel), Jean-Sébastien Bou (Caïn), Pierre-Yves Pruvot (Adam), Alain Buet (Anamalech), Jennifer Borghi (Ėve), Katia Velletaz (Méala), Yumiko Tanimura (Tirsa), Choeur de chambre de Namur, Les Agrémens, conducted by Guy Van Waas (Ediciones Speciales, 2 CDs, 2012)

== Sources ==
- Book accompanying the Guy Van Waas recording, containing essays by Alexandre Dratwicki, Benoît Dratwicki, Étienne Jardin and David Chaillou
- David Cairns Berlioz: The Making of an Artist, 1803–1832 (Cardinal, 1989)
- Spire Pitou The Paris Opera: 1715-1815: Rococo and Romantic: An Encyclopedia of Operas, Ballets, Composers and Performers (Greenwood, 1985)
