= Les Abencérages =

Opera by Luigi Cherubini

- Opera by Luigi Cherubini
- Title page of the manuscript score
- Librettist: Etienne de Jouy
- Language: French
- Based on: Gonzalve de Cordoue by Jean-Pierre Claris de Florian
- Premiere: 6 April 1813; Salle Montansier, Paris

Les Abencérages, ou L'étendard de Grenade (English: The Abencerrages, or The standard of Granada) is an opera in three acts by Luigi Cherubini with a French libretto by Etienne de Jouy, based on the novel Gonzalve de Cordoue by Jean-Pierre Claris de Florian. It was first performed on 6 April 1813 by the Académie Impériale de Musique (Paris Opera) at the Salle Montansier, with Napoleon and his wife, the Empress Marie-Louise, in the audience. The opera was initially a success but its popularity waned after the fall of Napoleon.

Because of its use of large choruses, spectacle and extensive dance music as well as its story line of a love affair played out against the background of major historical events, Les Abencérages is considered an important precursor of French grand opera. Almanzor's tenor aria, Suspendez de ses murs, was admired by composers such as Berlioz and has been recorded by singers including Georges Thill and Roberto Alagna. The ballet music in the first act contains variations on the popular melody La Follia (known in French as Les folies d'Espagne).

== Roles ==
Lavigne as Gonzalve de Cordoue

Nourrit as Almansor

Roles, voice types, premiere cast
Role	Voice type	Premiere cast, 6 April 1813 Conductor: Louis-Luc Loiseau de Persuis
Noraïme	soprano	Alexandrine-Caroline Branchu
Almansor	tenor	Louis Nourrit
Gonzalve de Cordoue	tenor	Jacques-Émile Lavigne
Alamir	baritone	Duparc
Kaled	tenor	Laforêt
Alemar	bass	Henri-Étienne Dérivis
Abderame	bass	Jean-Honoré Bertin
Octaïr	baritone	Alexandre
Egilone	soprano	Joséphine Armand
Troubadour	bass	Mouttit

== Synopsis ==
Place: The Kingdom of Granada in Moorish Spain
Time: End of the 15th century

=== Act 1 ===
The action of the opera concerns the feud between the families of the Abencerrages and the Zegris. In spite of this conflict, Almanzor, a young Abencerrage warrior, and the Zegri princess Noraïme have fallen in love and are due to be married. Almanzor has also made friends with the Spanish noble, Gonzalve of Cordoba and forged a peace treaty between the Muslims and the Christians. But Almanzor's popularity has made him enemies among many of the Zegris and they plot against him. On the day of the wedding, a revolt breaks out among a subject tribe and Almanzor is forced to leave to quell it. He takes with him the standard of Granada, which is so sacred that its loss would mean exile.

=== Act 2 ===
Almanzor defeats the rebels but he loses the sacred standard and is put on trial. Almanzor defends himself by claiming that one of his enemies, Octaïr, secretly snatched it away, but his excuses are not accepted and he is condemned to exile.

=== Act 3 ===
Almanzor cannot bear life away from Noraïme and steals into the garden of the Alhambra to meet her. But he is ambushed by his Zegris enemies, arrested and condemned to death unless a champion can be found to defend his cause in single combat. An unknown warrior bearing the lost standard of Granada arrives to take up the challenge on Almanzor's behalf. He fights and defeats the Zegris champion, Alamir, before revealing he is Gonzalve of Cordoba and showing proof it was Octaïr and his fellow conspirators who hid the standard in order to destroy Almanzor. The conspirators are arrested and Almanzor and Noraïme's wedding goes ahead to general rejoicing.

== Recordings ==
- In Italian as Gli Abencerragi with Anita Cerquetti, Louis Roney, Alvino Misciano and the Chorus and Orchestra of the Teatro Comunale di Firenze, conducted by Carlo Maria Giulini (recorded 1956; reissued on CD by Gala, 2001)
- Les Abencérages, Margherita Rinaldi, Francisco Ortiz, Jean Dupouy, Coro e Orchestra Sinfonica RAI di Milano, conducted by Peter Maag (radio recording from 1975; issued on CD by Arts Archives, 2006)
- Les Abencérages, Anaïs Constans, Edgaras Montvidas, Thomas Dolié; Orfeo Orchestra, Purcell Choir, conducted by György Vashegyi; 2 CDs, Bru Zane BZ1050, 2023
