= Henri Valentino =

French conductor and violinist

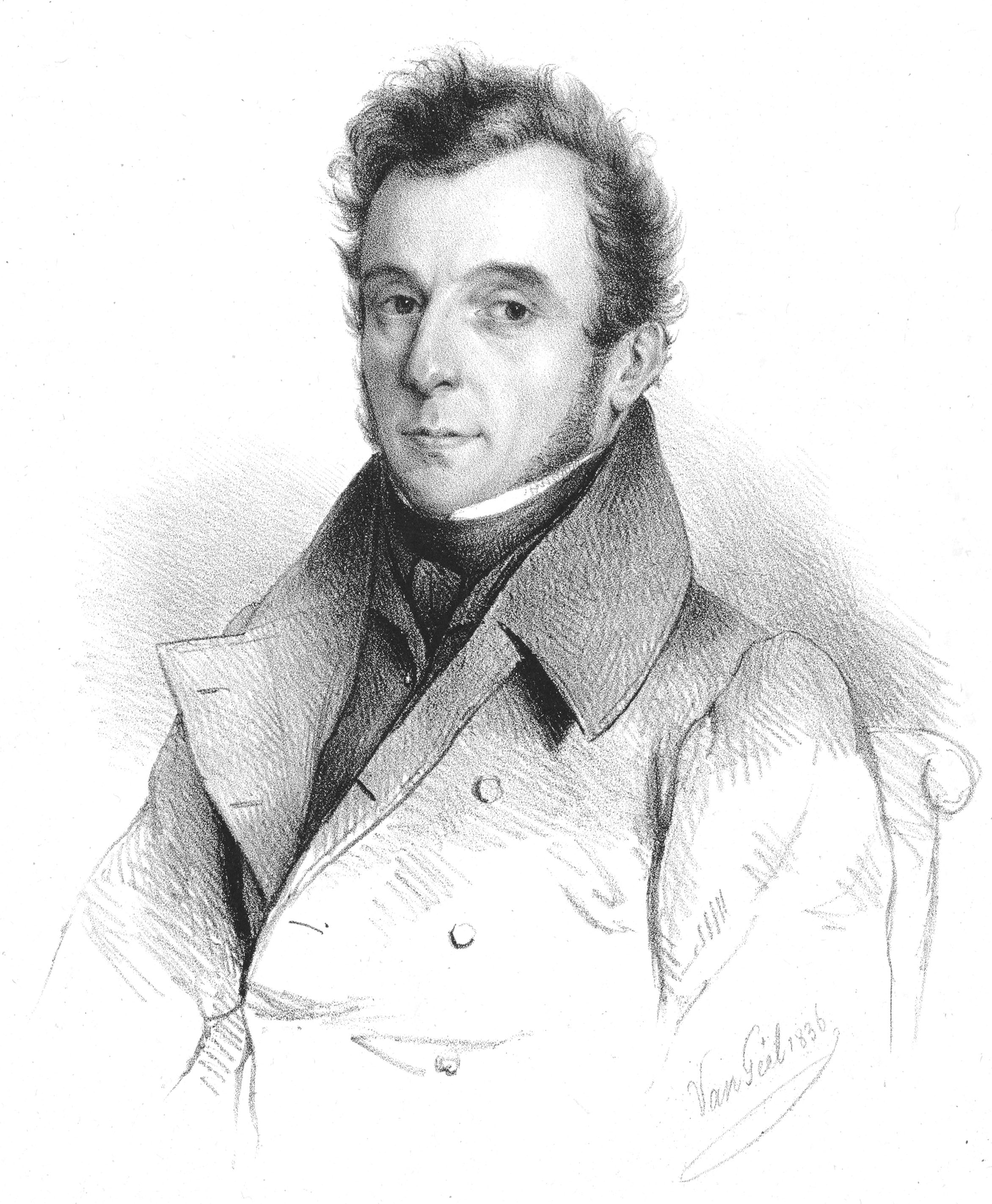
Henri Valentino in 1836

Henri Valentino (14 October 1785 – 28 January 1865) was a French conductor and violinist. From 1824 to 1832, he was co-conductor (with François Habeneck) of the Paris Opera, where he prepared and conducted the premieres of the first two grand operas, Auber's La muette de Portici and Rossini's Guillaume Tell. From 1832 to 1836, he was First Conductor of the Opéra-Comique, and from 1837 to 1841, conductor of classical music at the Concerts Valentino in a hall on the rue Saint-Honoré in Paris.

== Early life and career ==
He was born Henri-Justin-Armand-Joseph Valentino in Lille. His father was an Italian army pharmacist, who wanted his son to become a soldier, but Henri exhibited such a great talent for music, he was allowed to pursue that instead. At twelve he was playing violin in the local theatre (probably in Lille), and at fourteen was asked to substitute for a conductor on short notice, thereafter mainly dedicating himself to conducting. Later he conducted in Rouen.

== At the Paris Opera ==
In 1813 in Metz, Valentino married the niece of the composer Louis-Luc Loiseau de Persuis, who at that time was also the chief conductor of the Paris Opera Orchestra. Persuis died on 20 December 1819, and Rodolphe Kreutzer, who had been a deputy conductor since 1816, was named chief conductor in January 1820. Valentino was appointed deputy conductor under Kreutzer on 1 April. Valentino was "rewarded with the reversion of the title of first conductor conjointly with [François] Habeneck" in August. The decree did not take effect until Kreutzer's resignation on 1 December 1824, "when the two deputies had long been exercising the function of conductor in turn." Each of them was responsible for different new productions, that is, the conducting of the rehearsals and performances needed to bring a new work before the public.

Among the premieres conducted by Valentino at the Paris Opera are the following works:

- Olympie, 3-act opera (revised version) by Gaspare Spontini, 27 February 1826
- Moïse, 4-act opera by Gioachino Rossini, 26 March 1827
- La muette de Portici, 5-act opera by Daniel Auber, 29 February 1828
- Guillaume Tell, 4-act opera by Rossini, 3 August 1829
- Le dieu et la bayadère, 2-act opera by Auber, 13 October 1830
- Le serment, ou Les faux-monnayeurst, 3-act opera by Auber, 1 October 1832

The French music historian Arthur Pougin describes Valentino as a conductor of the first rank:

Gifted with a talent at once energetic and supple, meticulous of small details, capably inspiring the confidence and respect of all who were placed under him, he excited not only the admiration of the public, but that of the singers, dancers, choristers, and orchestral players. Moreover, his kindly nature and integrity, his firmness and fair-mindedness won him general favor and gave him great moral authority.

== Premiere of the Messe solennelle by Berlioz ==
Late in 1824, Valentino had applied for the post of conductor at the Chapel Royale, where he was already a violinist. The co-director of the Chapel, Jean-François Le Sueur, had a young student, Hector Berlioz, who was composing a mass (his Messe solennelle), intended for the Church of Saint-Roch in Paris. The forces required for performing the work were so large, that both he and his teacher believed it needed a great conductor. Realizing that the situation improved their chances of a positive response, they approached Valentino, who, after inspecting the score, agreed to conduct, despite having serious doubts concerning the quality of the players and singers that he might have at his disposal. The performance was set for 28 December. Unfortunately, the general rehearsal, held the day before the scheduled concert, was a disaster: many of the amateur musicians engaged by the church failed to appear, and the instrumental parts, copied by the choirboys, were full of errors, so the premiere had to be postponed. Despite the problems, Valentino encouraged Berlioz to persevere and promised to conduct, if conditions could be improved. Berlioz revised his score, copied out the parts himself, and managed to obtain a loan, enabling him to hire the Paris Opera orchestra, augmented with the best players from the Théâtre-Italien. The performance, conducted by Valentino on 10 June, was an undisputed success.

In 1824 Valentino was made the Chapel Royale orchestra's Second Conductor, under Charles-Henri Plantade, and was designated Plantade's heir apparent. Valentino never was able to take advantage of this privilege, however, since Plantade was still the First Conductor, when the monarchy was overthrown by the July Revolution of 1830.

== Departure from the Paris Opera ==
Spontini's 3-act opera Olympie was initially rehearsed by François Habeneck, but at one of the general rehearsals Spontini and Habeneck argued violently, and Valentino was asked to take over, replacing Habeneck as conductor in the further preparations for the performance of the opera. Pougin suggests that Habeneck likely developed a grudge against Valentino; that this was not without consequence several years later when Valentino chose to retire under pressure from management, and "it was precisely the rectitude and firmness of his character which became the cause, or at least the pretext, of his departure from the Opéra.” After the establishment of the July Monarchy in 1830, the administration of the Opera was radically changed: on 1 March 1831, it ceased being an enterprise of the state and was entrusted to a director/entrepreneur, who was to run it "at his own risks, perils, and fortune". Louis Véron, who assumed this responsibility, needed to reduce expenditures and decided to lower the salaries of the weaker members of the orchestra. Valentino, unwilling to subscribe to a measure he considered unfair, decided to take advantage of an offer to become chief conductor of the Opéra-Comique.

== At the Opéra-Comique ==
Valentino officially became First Conductor of the Opéra-Comique on 1 October 1832. Among the premieres he conducted for the company are the following works:

- Zampa, 3-act opéra-comique by Ferdinand Hérold, 3 May 1831
- Le pré aux clercs, 3-act opéra-comique by Ferdinand Hérold, 15 December 1832
- Le prison d'Édimbourg, 3-act opéra-comique by Michele Carafa, 20 July 1833
- Lestocq, 4-act opéra-comique by Daniel Auber, 24 May 1834
- Le chalet, 1-act opéra-comique by Adolphe Adam, 25 September 1834
- Robin des bois, 3-act opéra romantique by Carl Maria von Weber (Der Freischütz, adapted by Castil-Blaze), 15 January 1835
- Le cheval de bronze, 3-act opéra-féerie by Daniel Auber, 23 March 1835
- L'éclair, 3-act opéra-comique by Fromental Halévy, 16 December 1835
- Actéon, 1-act opéra-comique by Daniel Auber, 23 January 1836
- Les chaperons blancs, 3-act opéra-comique by Daniel Auber, 9 April 1836
- Le postillon de Lonjumeau, 3-act opéra-comique by Adolphe Adam, 13 October 1836

According to the music historian Gustave Chouquet, in his article on Valentino in the 1889 volume of A Dictionary of Music and Musicians, "on all these popular works [Valentino] bestowed a care, zeal, and attention to nuances beyond all praise."

=== Offenbach ===
In Valentino's final year at the Opéra-Comique, Jacques Offenbach became a cellist in the orchestra. Siegfried Kracauer, in his biography of Offenbach, recounts an unverifiable anecdote concerning the latter's shenanigans, arising from his boredom with having to repeat the same repertory night after night:

In order to make life a little brighter, he [Offenbach] started indulging in practical jokes, in which [Hippolyte] Seligmann [a fellow cellist] occasionally joined him. For instance, instead of following the score as they should have done, each would play alternate notes; or Offenbach would secretly tie several chairs and music stands together and then make them dance during the performance. The disadvantage of all this, however, was that M. Valentino, the conductor, had a strong sense of discipline. Offenbach's salary was eighty-three francs a month, and for disciplinary reasons and also, perhaps, for educative ones, Valentino would fine the culprit for each offense. Offenbach regarded boredom as the greater evil, so his salary often shrank to an alarming degree.

== Concerts Valentino ==
Valentino retired from the Opéra-Comique on 1 April 1836 and moved to Chantilly, but the following year, on 15 October 1837, he inaugurated a concert series in a hall at 247–251 rue Saint-Honoré in Paris, where Philippe Musard had held concerts of dance music and masked balls. Valentino's intent was to offer an alternative to the Concerts of the Conservatoire (conducted by Habeneck) and to expand the audience for "high-class" instrumental music. Known as the Concerts de la rue Saint-Honoré and as the Concerts Valentino, the programs combined instrumental pieces by Haydn, Mozart, and Beethoven, as well as turn-of-the-century French composers. There were also quadrilles, waltzes, and contredances directed by Charles-Alexandre Fessy and Dufresne. The concerts were popular, but the orchestra was always close to insolvency. The 1839 season was cut short, and the final concert was in April 1841. (The series was shut down by order of the government, according to the Revue et Gazette musicale.) Afterwards the hall was used as a ballroom, but was still referred to as the Salle Valentino.

In 1839 Valentino went to London, where he gave concerts at the Crown and Anchor Inn.

=== Wagner's Columbus overture ===
On 4 February 1841, as part of the Concerts on the rue Saint-Honoré, Valentino conducted an all German program, which began with Wagner's Columbus overture. This work, composed 1834–1835 in Magdeburg for a play by Wagner's friend Theodor Apel, called for six accomplished trumpet players, which the orchestra did not have. A cornettist, whom Wagner consulted, promised four, if Wagner would re-write the parts, although only two of these players were considered satisfactory. At the rehearsal Wagner found they were unable to play soft high notes without "cracking". Furthermore, Valentino and the rest of the orchestra made it clear they found the work "crazy". Perhaps unsurprisingly, the performance was a failure, and Wagner blamed the trumpets, although he also hints that the audience may have been bored by the piece. According to the German painter and historian Friedrich Pecht, the overture was hissed. During Wagner's two-and-a-half-year stay in Paris, this was the only work of his that he heard performed.

On 28 December 1841, an article in Leipzig's Neue Zeitschrift für Musik attacked Rossini's Stabat Mater, which was to be premiered at the Salle Ventadour in Paris on 7 January 1842. Although the article was written by Wagner, it was signed "H. Valentino". Wagner's biographer Ernest Newman writes: "It was inevitable that many readers of the article should regard it as coming from [Henri Valentino], and it is impossible to avoid the conclusion that Wagner maliciously intended to create that impression".

== Later life ==
After the demise of the Concerts Saint-Honoré, Valentino retired to Versailles. In 1846 Léon Pillet, director of the Paris Opera, offered him 15,000 francs per year to succeed the ailing Habeneck as the conductor of the Opera orchestra, but he declined. Valentino, who had remarried, continued living in obscurity with family and friends in Versailles, and he died there in 1865.

== Bibliography ==
- Cairns, David (1999). Berlioz. Volume One. The Making of an Artist 1803–1832. Berkeley, California: University of California Press. ISBN 9780713993851 (hardcover). ISBN 9780520240568 (paperback).
- Casaglia, Gherardo (2005)."Guillaume Tell, 3 August 1829". L'Almanacco di Gherardo Casaglia (in Italian).
- Casaglia, Gherardo (2005)."La muette de Portici, 29 February 1828". L'Almanacco di Gherardo Casaglia (in Italian).
- Castil-Blaze (1855). L'Académie impériale de musique: histoire littéraire, musicale, politique et galante de ce théâtre, de 1645 à 1855, vol. 2. Paris: Castil-Blaze. Title page at Google Books.
- Chouquet, Gustave (1889). "Valentino, Henri Justin Armand Joseph", vol. 4, p. 214, in A Dictionary of Music and Musicians, 4 volumes. London: Macmillan. Title page at Google Books.
- Cooper, Jeffrey; Ellis, Katharine (2001). "Valentino, Henri Justin Armand Joseph" in The New Grove Dictionary of Music and Musicians, 2nd edition, edited by Stanley Sadie. London: Macmillan. ISBN 9781561592395 (hardcover). OCLC 419285866 (eBook). Also at Oxford Music Online (subscription required).
- Kracauer, Siegfried (1937; translation 2002). Jacques Offenbach and the Paris of His Time, translated by Gwenda David and Eric Mosbacher from Jacques Offenbach und das Paris seiner Zeit (in German). Amsterdam: Allert de Lange (1937). New York: Zone Books (2002). ISBN 9781890951306.
- Holoman, D. Kern (1989). Berlioz. Cambridge, Massachusetts: Harvard University Press. ISBN 9780674067783.
- Larousse, Pierre (1876). ""Valentino (Henri-Justin-Armand-Joseph)", p. 739, in Grand dictionnaire universel du XIXe siècle, vol. 15. Paris. Title page at Internet Archive.
- Macdonald, Hugh (2001). "Habeneck, François-Antoine" in The New Grove Dictionary of Music and Musicians, 2nd edition, edited by Stanley Sadie. London: Macmillan. ISBN 9781561592395 (hardcover). OCLC 419285866 (eBook). Also at Oxford Music Online (subscription required).
- Martinet, André (1887). Offenbach: sa vie & son oeuvre. Paris: Dentu. Title page at Google Books.
- Mongrédien, Jean; Quetin, Laurine (2001). "Persuis, Louis-Luc Loiseau de" in The New Grove Dictionary of Music and Musicians, 2nd edition, edited by Stanley Sadie. London: Macmillan. ISBN 9781561592395 (hardcover). OCLC 419285866 (eBook). Also at Oxford Music Online (subscription required).
- Newman, Ernest (1937). The Life of Richard Wagner. Volume I: 1813–1848. New York: Alfred A. Knopf. OCLC 656734480. 1976 reprint: Cambridge: Cambridge University Press. ISBN 9780521290944.
- Osborne, Richard (2007). Rossini: His Life and Works, 2nd edition. Oxford: Oxford University Press. ISBN 9780195181296.
- Pougin, Arthur (1880). "Valentino (Henri-Justin-Joseph)", pp. 597–598, in Biographie universelle des musiciens et Bibliographie générale de la musique par F.-J. Fétis. Supplément et complément, vol. 2. Paris: Firmin-Didot. Title page at Google Books.
- Tamvaco, Jean-Louis (2000). Les Cancans de l'Opéra. Chroniques de l'Académie Royale de Musique et du théâtre, à Paris sous les deux restorations (2 volumes, in French). Paris: CNRS Editions. ISBN 9782271056856.
- Weinstock, Herbert (1968; reprint 1987). Rossini: A Biography. New York: Knopf (1968). New York: Limelight Editions (1987). ISBN 9780879100711.
- Wild, Nicole (1989). Dictionnaire des théâtres parisiens au XIXe siècle: les théâtres et la musique. Paris: Aux Amateurs de livres. ISBN 9780828825863. ISBN 9782905053800 (paperback). OCLC 20954302 (all editions)
- Wolff, Stéphane (1962; reprint 1983). L'Opéra au Palais Garnier (1875–1962). Paris: Deposé au journal L'Entr'acte OCLC 7068320, 460748195. Paris: Slatkine (1983) ISBN 9782050002142.
- Yon, Jean-Claude (2000). Jacques Offenbach (in French). [Paris]: Galimard. ISBN 9782070747757.
