= Olimpie =

Opera by Gaspare Spontini

- Opera by Gaspare Spontini
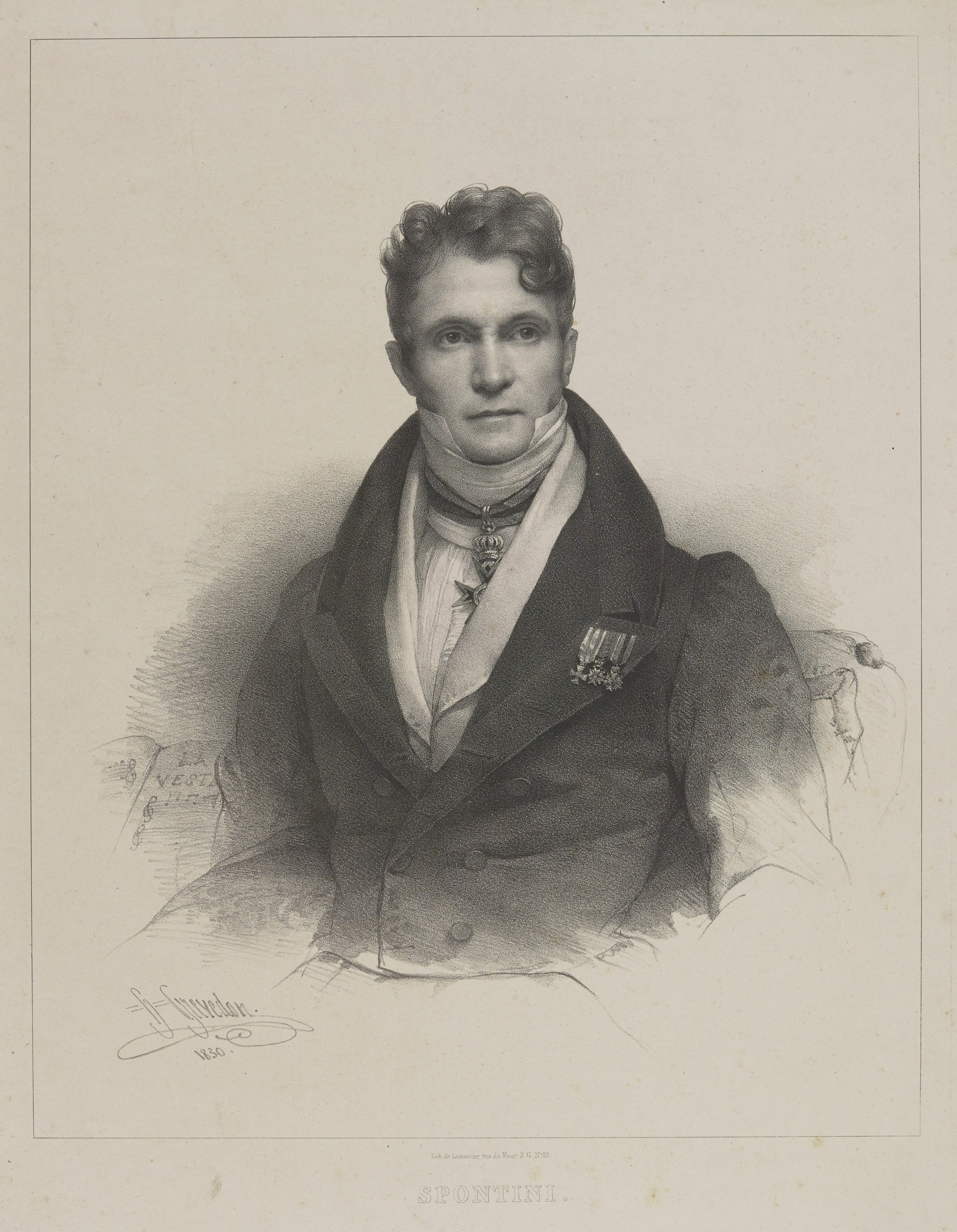
- The composer
- Librettist: Armand-Michel Dieulafoy; Charles Brifaut
- Language: French
- Based on: Olimpie by Voltaire
- Premiere: 22 December 1819; Salle Montansier, Paris

Olimpie (also spelled Olympie) is an opera in three acts by Gaspare Spontini. The French libretto, by Armand-Michel Dieulafoy and Charles Brifaut, is based on the play of the same name by Voltaire (1761). Olimpie was first performed on 22 December 1819 by the Paris Opéra at the Salle Montansier. When sung in Italian or German, it is usually given the title Olimpia.

== Background ==
The story takes place in the aftermath of the death of Alexander the Great, who left a vast empire, stretching from Macedonia through Persia to the Indian Ocean. His surviving generals fought for control of the empire and divided it up. Two of the historical characters in Voltaire's play and Spontini's opera, Cassander and Antigonus, were among the rivals competing for parts of the empire. Antigonus was one of Alexander's generals, while Cassander was the son of another of Alexander's generals, Antipater. Alexander's widow, Statira was supposedly killed by Alexander's first wife Roxana shortly after his death, but in Voltaire's play and Spontini's opera, she survives incognito, as a priestess of Diana in Ephesus. The title character Olimpie, daughter of Statira and Alexander, is likely entirely fictional.

It wasn't long after the death of Alexander that people began to glorify and mythologize his life. By the 3rd century it was believed by many that he was a mortal who had been selected by the gods to perform his heroic deeds. Although it is now thought that Alexander died from a fever, for many centuries it was believed he was murdered. The 'Alexander Romance', which first appeared at that time, obscured the true explanation of his death: "the speaking trees of the Amazons were said to have told him of his early death during his last battle. Alexander would die after drinking a poisonous mixture served to him by his valet Iolus upon his return." It is not surprising, that Voltaire and Spontini's librettists Dieulafoy and Brifaut also assume that Alexander was murdered. Cassander's father Antipater was often designated as the leader of a poisoning plot, and Cassander himself was well known for his hostility to the memory of Alexander.

== The work and its performance history ==
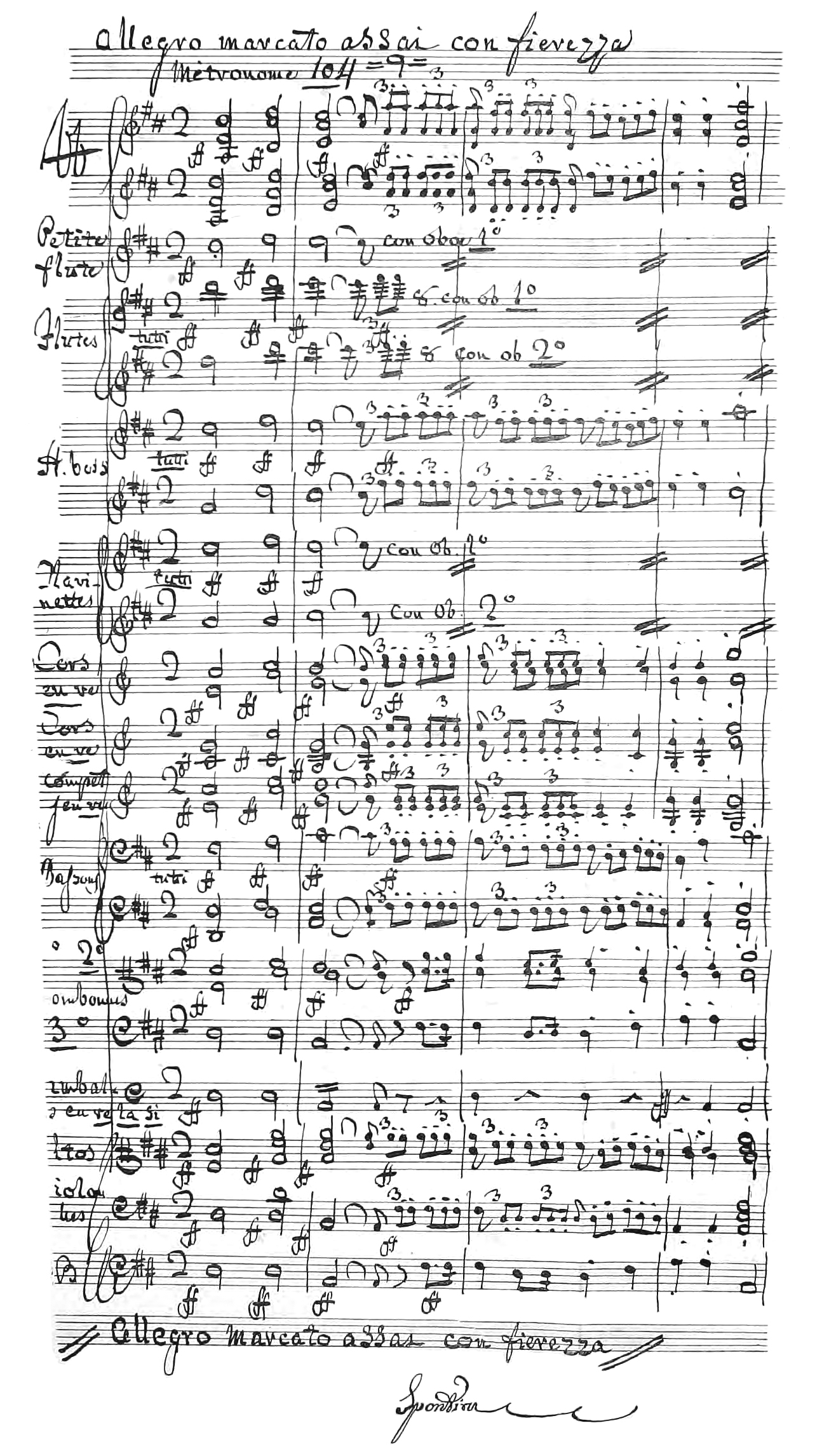
Autograph ms of the first page of the overture

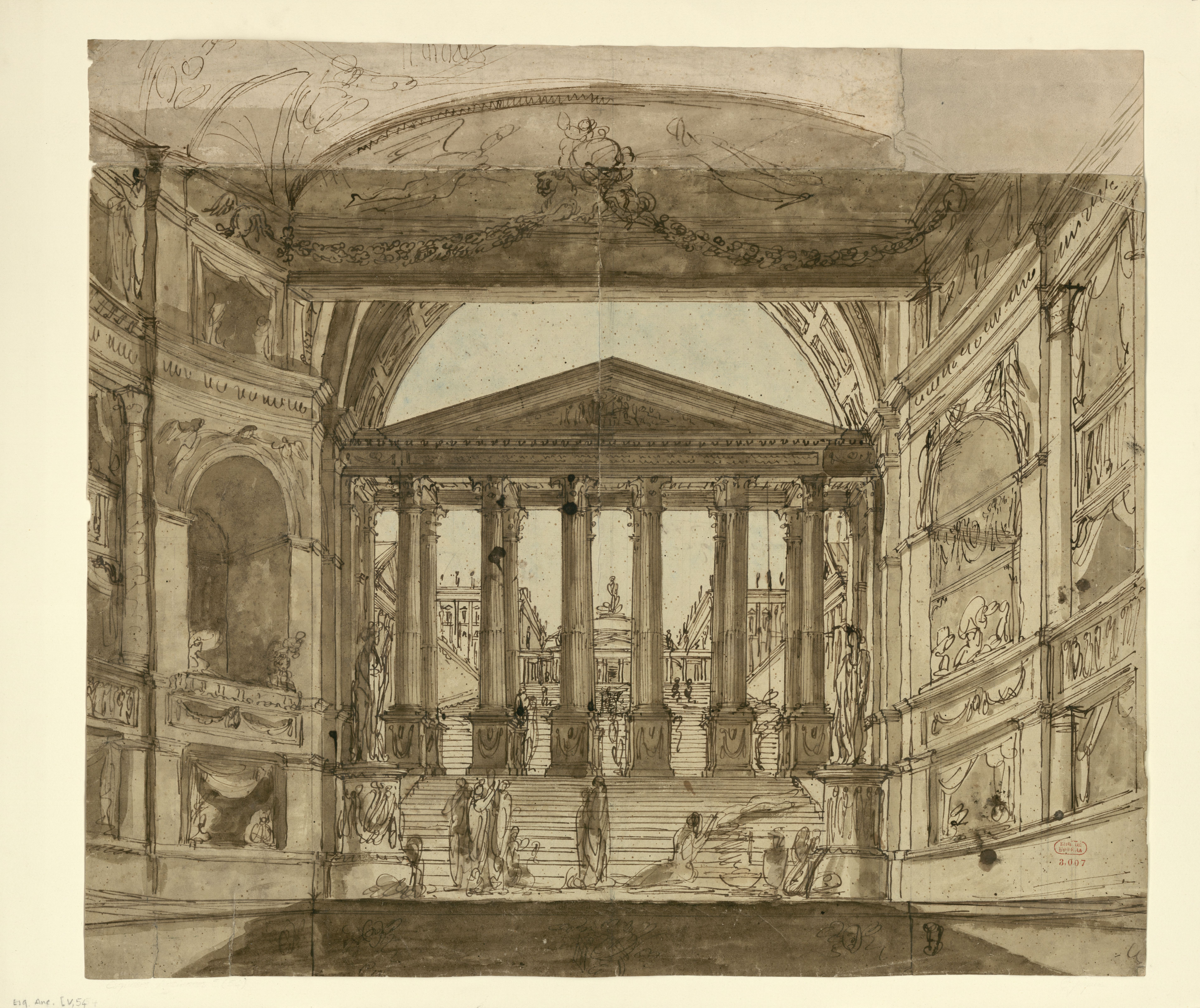
Sketch by Ignazio Degotti of the décor for act 1 of the 1819 production

Spontini began composing Olimpie in 1815. It was his third major, 3-act work for the Paris Opera. In it, he "combined the psychologically exact character-drawing of La vestale [of 1807] with the massive choral style of his Fernand Cortez [of 1809] and wrote a work stripped of spectacular effects. In its grandiose conception, it appears the musical equivalent of neoclassical architecture." The Parisian premiere received mixed reviews, and Spontini withdrew it after the seventh performance (on 12 January 1820), so he could revise the finale with a happy rather than tragic ending.

The first revised version was given in German as Olimpia in Berlin, where it was conducted by Spontini, who had been invited there by Frederick William III to become the Prussian General Musikdirector. E. T. A. Hoffmann provided the German translation of the libretto. This version was first staged on 14 May 1821 at the Königliches Opernhaus, where it was a success. After 78 performances in Berlin, it was given productions in Dresden (12 November 1825, with additions by Carl Maria von Weber), Kassel, Cologne, and Darmstadt (26 December 1858).

Olimpie calls for huge orchestral forces (including the first use of the ophicleide). The finale of the Berlin version included spectacular effects, in which Cassandre rode in on a live elephant. Thus, like La vestale and Fernand Cortez, the work prefigures later French Grand Opera.

Spontini revised the opera a second time, retaining the happy ending for its revival by the Opéra at the Salle Le Peletier on 27 February 1826. Adolphe Nourrit replaced his father Louis in the role of Cassandre, and an aria composed by Weber was also included. Even in its fully revised form, the opera failed to hold the stage. Audiences found its libretto too old-fashioned, and it could not compete with the operas of Rossini.

The opera was given in Italian in concert form in Rome on 12 December 1885 and revived more recently in Florence in 1930, at La Scala in Milan in 1966 (for which a sound recording is available), and at the Perugia Festival in 1979.

== Roles ==
Roles, voice types, premiere cast
Role	Voice type	Premiere cast, 22 December 1819 Conductor: Rodolphe Kreutzer	Second revised version, 27 February 1826 Conductor: Henri Valentino
Olimpie, daughter of Alexander the Great and Statira	soprano	Augustine Albert	Laure Cinti-Damoreau
Statira, widow of Alexander	soprano	Caroline Branchu	Caroline Branchu
Cassandre, son of Antipater, King of Macedon	tenor	Louis Nourrit	Adolphe Nourrit
Antigone, king of a part of Asia	bass	Henri-Étienne Dérivis	Henri-Étienne Dérivis
L'Hiérofante, high priest, who presides over the celebration of the Great Mysteries	bass	Louis-Bartholomé-Pascal Bonel	Louis-Bartholomé-Pascal Bonel
Arbate, Cassandre's officer	tenor	(no role)	Hyacinthe Trévaux
Hermas, Antigone's officer	bass	Charles-Louis Pouilley	Charles-Louis Pouilley
Chorus: Priests, vice ministers, initiates, sorcerers, priestesses, royal officers, soldiers, people, Bacchantes, Amazons, navigators

== Synopsis ==
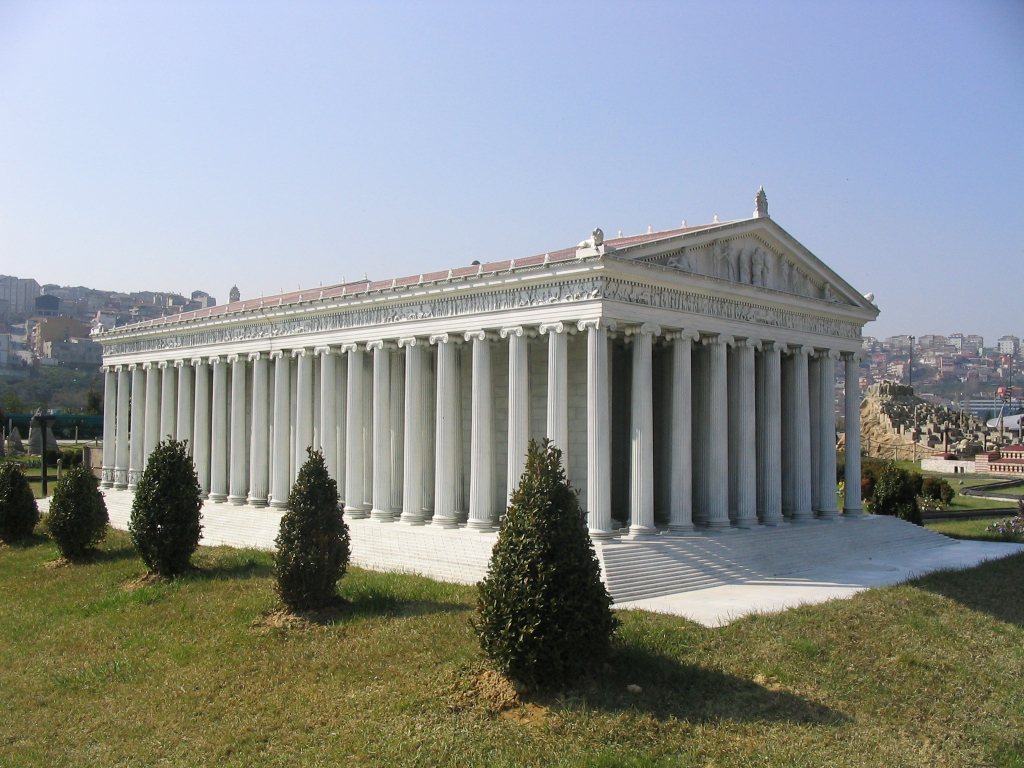
Scale model of the Temple of Diana at Ephesus

Place: Ephesus
Time: 308 BC, 15 years after the death of Alexander the Great

=== Act 1 ===
The square in front of the Temple of Diana

Antigone, King of a part of Asia, and Cassandre, King of Macedon, have been implicated in Alexander's murder. They have also been at war with one another but are now ready to be reconciled. Nevertheless, a new obstacle to peace arises in the form of the slave girl Aménais, with whom both the kings are in love. In reality, Aménais is Alexander the Great's daughter, Olimpie, in disguise. Statira, Alexander's widow and Olimpie's mother, has also assumed the guise of the priestess Arzane. She denounces the proposed marriage between "Aménais" and Cassandre, accusing the latter of Alexander's murder.

=== Act 2 ===
Statira and Olimpie reveal their true identities to one another and to Cassandre. Olimpie defends Cassandre against Statira's accusations, claiming that he once saved her life. Statira is unconvinced and is still intent on revenge with the help of Antigone and his army.

=== Act 3 ===
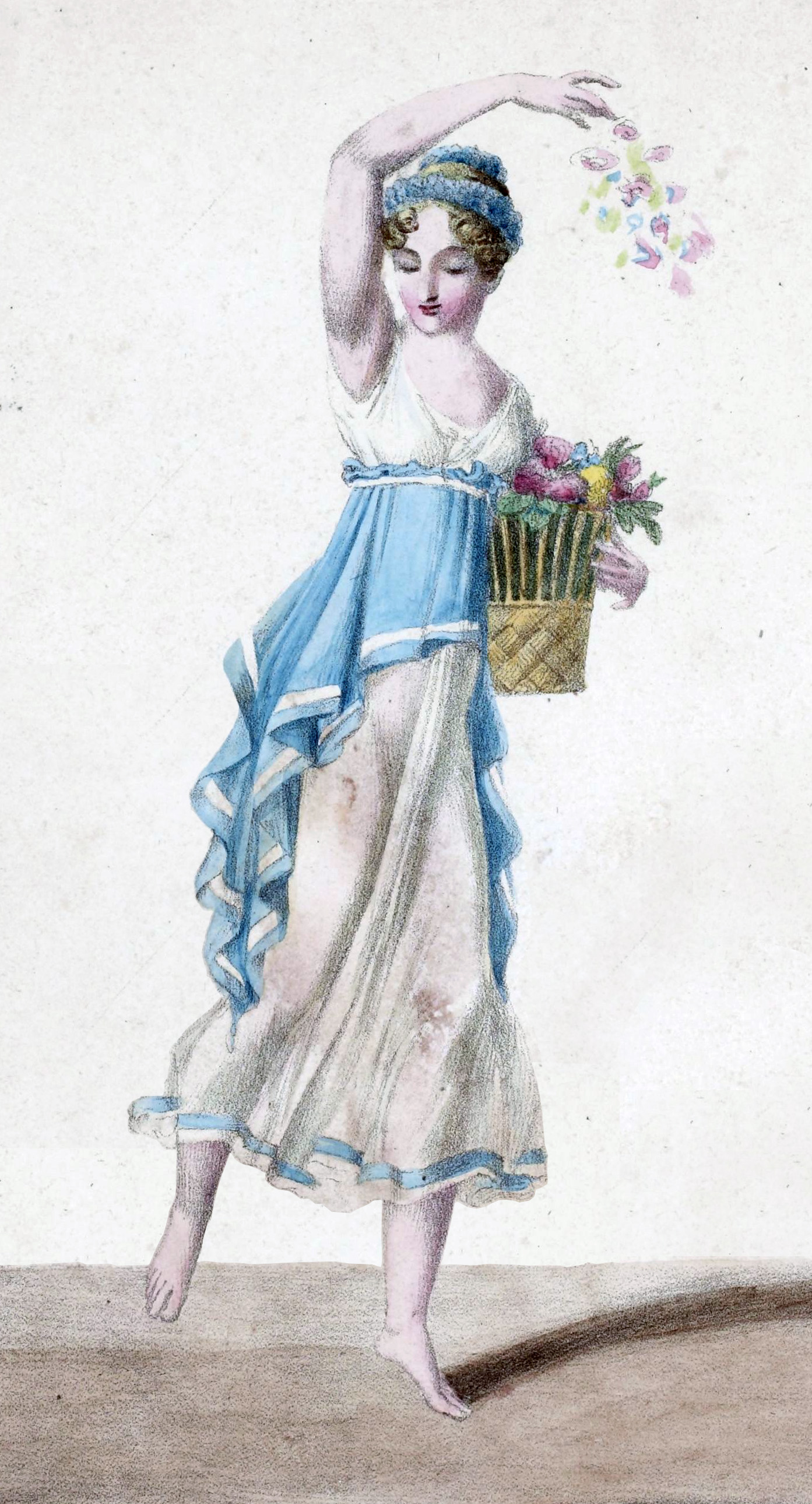
A young Éphésienne scattering flowers in act 3, lithograph by Godefroy Engelmann

Olimpie is divided between her love for Cassandre and her duty to her mother. The troops of Cassandre and Antigone clash and Antigone is mortally wounded. Before dying he confesses he was responsible for the death of Alexander, not Cassandre. Cassandre and Olimpie are now free to marry.

[In the original 1819 Paris version, Cassander is the murderer of Alexander and after his victory, "Statira stabs herself on stage and, together with Olympia, she is called to the Lord by the spirit of Alexander, who emerges from his grave (in Voltaire's drama, Olympia is married to Antigonus and throws herself into the blazing pyre in a confession of her love for Cassander)."

== Recordings ==
Year	Cast (Olimpie, Statira, Cassandre, Antigone, Hermas, Hiérofante)	Conductor Orchestra, Chorus	Label Catalogue number
1966	Pilar Lorengar, Fiorenza Cossotto, Franco Tagliavini, Giangiacomo Guelfi, Silvio Maionica, Nicola Zaccaria	Francesco Molinari-Pradelli; La Scala Orchestra and Chorus (Recorded live on 6 June 1966, sung in Italian)	CD: Opera d'Oro; Cat: OPD 1395
1984	Júlia Várady, Stefania Toczyska, Franco Tagliavini, Dietrich Fischer-Dieskau, Josef Becker, George Fortune	Gerd Albrecht; Berlin Radio Symphony Orchestra, RIAS Kammerchor	CD: ORFEO; Cat: C 137 862 H
2016	Karina Gauvin, Kate Aldrich, Mathias Vidal, Josef Wagner, Philippe Souvage, Patrick Bolleire	Jérémie Rhorer	CD: Bru Zane; Cat: BZ1035
