= Louis Nourrit =

French operatic tenor

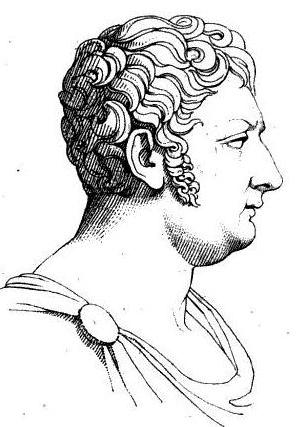
Louis Nourrit.

Louis Nourrit (4 August 1780, Montpellier – 23 September 1831, Brunoy) was an early 19th-century French tenor. Throughout his operatic career, Nourrit also operated as a diamond merchant.

== Biography ==
After he left Montpellier, he was admitted at the Conservatoire de Paris in 1802 where he received lessons from Pierre-Jean Garat. In 1805 he made his debut at the Paris Opéra as Renaud in Gluck's Armide. After serving as the understudy to Étienne Lainez for a few years, he was promoted to the Opéra's leading tenor in 1812. He took part in the premieres of Les Abencérages by Luigi Cherubini (1813) and Olimpie by Gaspare Spontini (1819). Other roles included those of Orphée in Aladin ou La lampe merveilleuse, an opéra féerie of 1822 by Nicolò), Harem in La caravane du Caire by Grétry, and Colin in Le devin du village. In 1821 he saluted his son Adolphe's tenor debut in Gluck's Iphigénie en Tauride, by appearing in the minor role of a Scythian; in 1824 they co-starred in Les deux Salem by Joseph Daussoigne-Méhul; and they finally appeared together in Gioacchino Rossini's Le siège de Corinthe in 1826. This was the last stage appearance of Louis who thus left his position as the Opéra's principal tenor to his son. He died in 1831.

His other son, Auguste Nourrit, was also an operatic tenor.

Other performances by Louis Nourrit included:

- Fernand Cortez (28 November 1809), by Gaspare Spontini
- Les bayadères (8 August 1810) by Charles-Simon Catel
- La mort d'Abel (1810) by Rodolphe Kreutzer
- Les amazones (1811) by Étienne Méhul
- L'oriflamme (1814), by Étienne Méhul.
