= Henri-Étienne Dérivis =

French operatic bass (1780–1856)

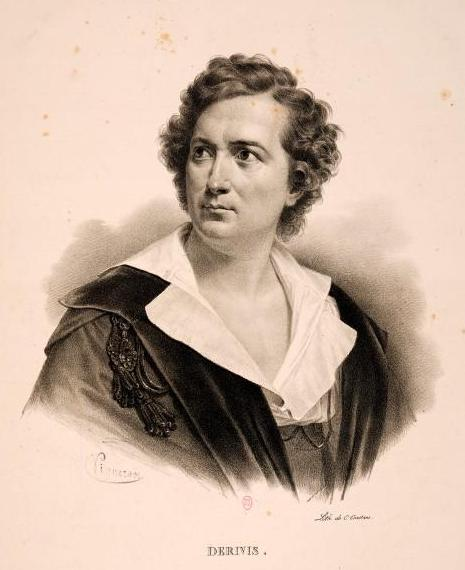
Henri-Étienne Dérivis

Henri-Étienne Dérivis (2 August 1780 – 1 February 1856) was a French operatic bass. For 25 years he was a leading singer at the Paris Opéra where he made his debut in 1803. He was born in Albi and died in Livry-Gargan at the age of 75.

== Life and career ==
Dérivis was born in Albi, a town in southern France and entered the Paris Conservatory in December 1799. He made his debut at the Paris Opéra on 11 February 1803 as Sarastro in Les Mystères d'lsis (the French version of Mozart's The Magic Flute). The same year he was also appointed a singer at Napoleon's court. During the course of his 25-year career at the Opéra, he performed all the leading bass roles and sang in many world premieres, including Spontini's La vestale and Rossini's Le siège de Corinthe. His last appearance there was on 5 May 1828 as Œdipe in Sacchini's Œdipe à Colone, a role he had sung to great success many times in his career. After retiring from the company, he continued to perform in French provincial theatres for several more years.

Dérivis died in Livry-Gargan, a suburb of Paris, in 1856 at the age of 75. His wife died in 1819. She had had a very brief career as a soprano at the Paris Opéra where she performed under her maiden name, Naudet. Their son Prosper Dérivis was also a prominent operatic bass and their granddaughter Maria Dérivis sang leading mezzo-soprano roles in various European opera houses in the late 19th century.

== Roles created ==
The roles created by Dérivis during his time at the Paris Opéra include:

- Chief Priest in Spontini's La vestale (1807)
- Polyxêne in Kreutzer's Aristippe (1808)
- High Priest in Spontini's Fernand Cortez (1809)
- Adam in Lesueur's La mort d'Adam et son apothéose (1809)
- Olkar in Catel's Les bayadères (1810)
- Zéthus in Méhul's Les amazones (1811)
- Alemar in Cherubini's Les Abencérages (1813)
- Antigone in Spontini's Olimpie (1819)
- King Timorkan in Isouard's Aladin ou La lampe merveilleuse (1822)
- Adam in Kreutzer's La mort d'Abel (1823)
- Appius in Berton's Virginie ou Les décemvirs (1823)
- Vendôme in Auber's Vendôme en Espagne (1823)
- Mahomet II in Rossini's Le siège de Corinthe (1826)
- Banquo in Chélard's Macbeth (1827)
