= Les amazones =

Opera by Étienne Méhul

- Opera by Étienne Méhul
- Méhul in 1799 – portrait by Antoine Gros
- Librettist: Victor-Joseph Étienne de Jouy
- Language: French
- Premiere: 17 December 1811; Paris Opéra

Les amazones, ou La fondation de Thèbes (The Amazons, or The Founding of Thebes) is an opera in three acts by the French composer Étienne Méhul with a libretto by Victor-Joseph Étienne de Jouy. It was first performed at the Paris Opéra on 17 December 1811 with the Emperor Napoleon and his new wife, Marie-Louise in the audience. The plot, which concerns the reconciliation of two warring peoples, was intended to symbolise the peace between France and Austria.

== Performance history ==
The opera was a failure, its lack of success blamed on the weak libretto. Méhul's early biographer, Pierre Vieillard, was one of the musicians at the premiere. He wrote, "A bizarre occurrence added to the woes of this sorry work. The worst thing which went wrong was the denouement which, one might say, fell from a great height, since Jupiter himself appeared up in the air to recognise Amphion and Zethus as his sons. At the very moment when this revelation should have stopped short the Amazons, ready to strike down the unknown children of their queen, a cloud chariot was indeed seen to descend from the flies, but no Jupiter; the deus ex machina was missing. Absorbed in conversation, the actor Bertin had failed to hear the machine operator's whistle, and the chariot left without the god. He had to be restrained from throwing himself from the top of the stage. What made the accident even more heartbreaking for him was that the Emperor Napoleon and Marie-Louise were among the spectators of this disastrous performance. I was in the orchestra and I can bear witness to the hilarity this episode aroused in their Imperial Majesties. I doubt the great Napoleon ever laughed so heartily."

Méhul, his health already undermined by tuberculosis, was crushed by the failure of Les amazones. Elizabeth Bartlet describes it as "the worst blow that the composer ever experienced." Méhul gave up writing for the stage for a while and retired to his house at Pantin in order to devote himself to his passion for gardening.

== Roles ==
Role	Voice type	Premiere Cast, 17 December 1811 (Conductor:)
Antiope, Queen of the Amazons	soprano	Alexandrine-Caroline Branchu
Ériphile, a young Amazon	soprano	Augustine Albert-Hymm
Amphion	tenor	Louis Nourrit
Zéthus, Amphion's brother	bass	Henri-Étienne Dérivis
Jupiter	bass	Jean-Honoré Bertin
Licidas, the Theban chief	bass	Duparc
An Amazon	soprano	Joséphine Armand
A Theban officer		Henrard
Chorus of warriors, Amazons, Theban people

== Sources ==
- Alexandre Dratwicki & Etienne Jardin, Le Fer et les Fleurs : Etienne-Nicolas Méhul (1763-1817) (Actes Sud & Palazzetto Bru Zane, 2017)
- Adélaïde de Place Étienne Nicolas Méhul (Bleu Nuit Éditeur, 2005)
- Pierre Vieillard Méhul: sa vie et ses œuvres (Ledoyen, 1859)
- General introduction to Méhul's operas in the introduction to the edition of Stratonice by M. Elizabeth C. Bartlet (Pendragon Press, 1997)
