= Théâtre de l'Académie Impériale de Musique =

Théâtre de l'Académie Impériale de Musique may refer to the opera company commonly known as the Paris Opera or one of two different theatres used during periods when the company was officially named the Académie Impériale de Musique:

- Théâtre National de la rue de la Loi (1804–1815)
- Salle Le Peletier (1852–1854)
