= Mongrédien =

Mongrédien is a surname. Notable people with the surname include:

- Augustus Mongredien (1807–1888), British political economist
- Jean Mongrédien, French musicologist
