= Anacréon (Cherubini) =

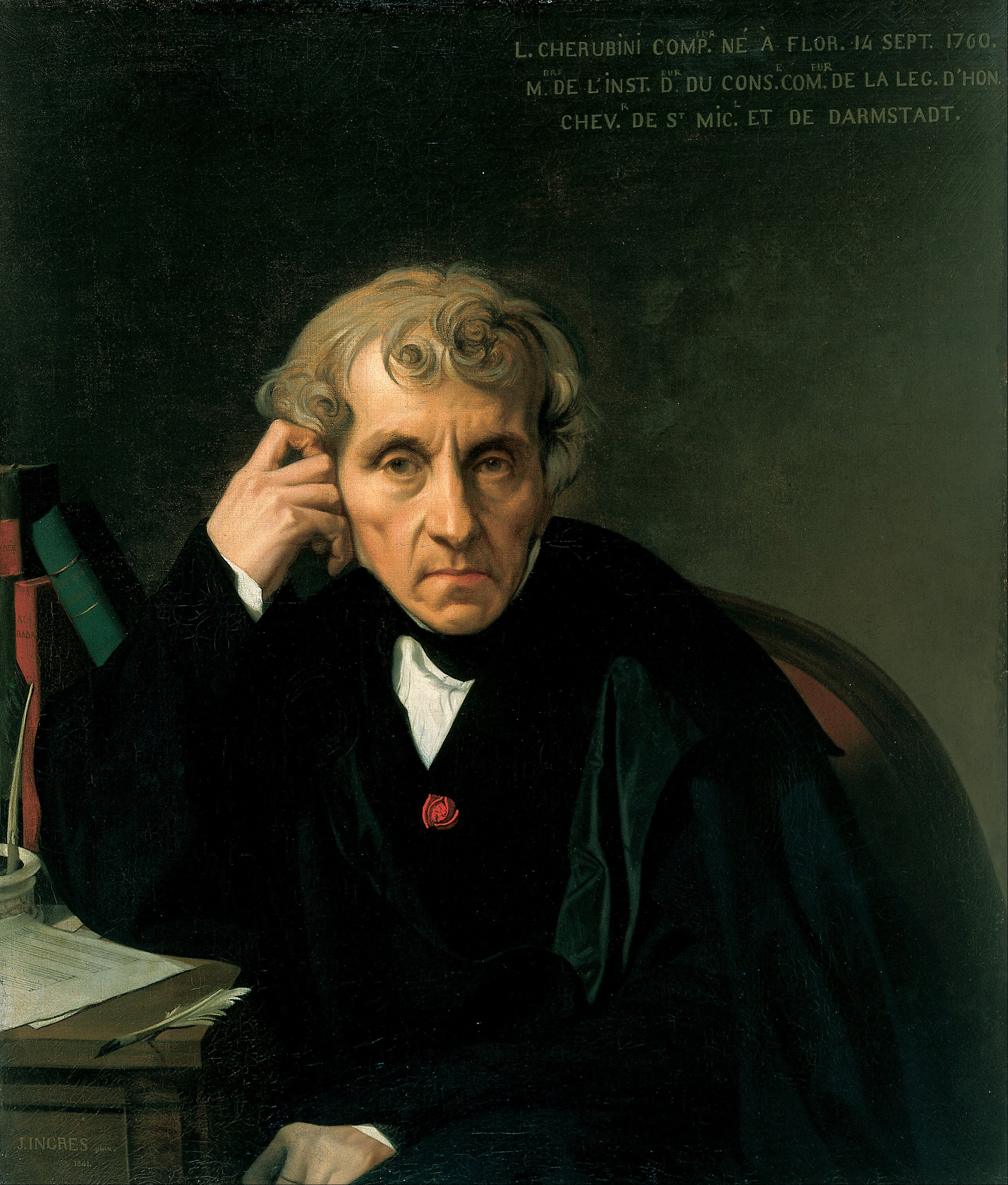
Luigi Cherubini

Anacréon, ou L'amour fugitif is an opera-ballet in two acts by Luigi Cherubini with a French libretto by C. R. Mendouze. It was premiered on 4 October 1803 by the Paris Opéra at the Salle Montansier. The choreography was by Pierre-Gabriel Gardel. The work proved to be a complete failure, ending its run on 1 January 1804 after only seven performances. The subject matter, a love affair of the Ancient Greek poet Anacreon, was completely alien to the spirit of the time. One critic complained that in his protagonist Cherubini had represented "un vieux debauché déguisé en héros d'opéra" ("an old debauchee disguised as an opera hero").

The overture was praised by Weber and Berlioz and has frequently been recorded. The complete opera was revived by the Italian radio company RAI in 1973 and on stage at La Scala in 1983 with Gianandrea Gavazzeni conducting.

== Roles ==
Role	Voice type	Premiere cast, 4 October 1803 (Conductor: – )
Anacréon	tenor	François Lays
Corine	soprano	Caroline Branchu
L'Amour (Cupid)	soprano	Augustine Hymm
Vénus	soprano	Mme Jannard
Bathille	tenor	Casimir Eloy
Glycère	soprano	Mlle Lacombe
Athanaïs	soprano	Marie Gardel
Two slaves	sopranos	Désirée Pelet, Mlle Chollet

== Synopsis ==
Place: The Greek city of Teos in ancient Ionia

=== Act 1 ===
The young hetaira Corine is in love with the poet Anacréon, unaware that he shares the same feelings for her. As she prepares for Anacréon's fiftieth birthday celebrations, she prays to Cupid to bring her and the poet together in spite of the difference in age between them. There is a storm outside and a tiny guest arrives at Anacréon's house, soaked to the skin. It is Cupid in disguise, on the run from his mother Venus. He uses his powers to charm all those present.

=== Act 2 ===
Cupid moves Anacréon with the tale of his unhappy childhood. Then he plays a prank by making Glycère and Bathille renew their unhappy love affair. At this point a message arrives from Venus, who has just learned of her son's escape. She promises a prize to anyone who captures him: the fulfillment of every wish. The guests soon see through Cupid's disguise and tie him up, but his laments lead them to release him again. Once he begins to play more tricks, however, they capture him again and bind him to the statue of Wisdom. Venus is happy to fulfill Anacréon's two wishes: that the rest of his life should be devoted to the cult of beauty; and that Corine should return his love.

== Reception ==
In a treatise titled "Rudiments of Thorough Bass" by respected English composer William Shield (1815), the author includes an excerpt of the overture to convey the "taste, spirit, and brilliant effects of a composition so full of contrast, without confusion." The crescendo from the overture was noted particularly for being "universally admitted to be the most effective instrumental CRESCENDO that ever was perform'd in a grand Orchestra: 'Still rising in a climax till the last, surpassing all, is not to be surpast.'" Praise was given for Cherubini's choice of notes for the trills, with Shield writing that the "open strings of the violins greatly assist the intonation and excite strong vibrations."
