= Charles Brifaut =

French writer (1781–1857)

Charles Brifaut (15 February 1781, Dijon – 5 June 1857, Paris) was a French poet, journalist, publicist and playwright.

== Biography ==
A liberal royalist, Brifaut edited the Gazette de France and attended the salon of Madame Vigée-Lebrun. He also worked as a censor and it was he who the interior minister entrusted with controlling Hernani and with warning Victor Hugo that Marion Delorme had been stopped (that play would not be put on until two years later). Pensioned off by Charles X, he was elected to the Académie française in 1826.

He was associated with the editing of the memoirs of the actress Lola Montez, one of the lovers of Alexandre Dumas (Aventures de la celèbre danseuse raconté par elle-même, 1847).

== Works ==
- Rosamonde, poème en trois chants, suivi de poésies diverses (1813)
- Ninus II, tragedy in 5 acts, Paris, Théâtre-Français (19 April 1813)
- Olimpie, opera in 3 acts after Voltaire, music by Gaspare Spontini, Paris, Académie Royale de Musique at the Théâtre de l'Opéra-Montansier (22 December 1819)
- Charles de Navarre, tragedy in 5 acts, Paris, Odéon (1 March 1820) (Iconography online)
- Dialogues, contes et autres poésies (1824)
- Le Droit de vie et de mort, poem (1829) (Online text)
- Les Déguisements, ou Une Folie de grands hommes, verse comedy in 1 act (1829)
- Les Éphémères (1850)
- Œuvres (complete works in 6 volumes, 1858):
  - Gallica: 1 3 4
  - Google Books: 1 2 3 4 5 6
- Récits d'un vieux parrain à son jeune filleul (1899)
- Souvenirs d'un académicien sur la Revolution, le premier Empire et la Restauration, with an introduction and notes by Dr. Cabanès, followed by correspondence by the author (1920–21)

== Bibliography ==
- Franqueville, Charles Franquet (1840-1922; comte de) (1895). "378. – Brifaut (Charles)". Le premier siècle de l'Institut de France, 25 octobre 1795 – 25 octobre 1895, Volume 1. Paris: J. Rothschild.
- Godefroy, Frédéric (1880). "Brifaut (Charles)". Histoire de la littérature française au XIXe siècle. Paris: Gaume.
- Muteau, Charles; Garnier, Joseph (1860). "Brifaut (Charles)", Galerie bourguignonne, volume 3, p. 331. Dijon: Picard/Lamarche. Paris: Durand/Dumoulin.
- Vapereau, Gustave (1876). "Brifaut (Charles)". Dictionnaire universal des littératures. Paris: Hachette.
