= Michel Dieulafoy =

French librettist and playwright (1762–1823)

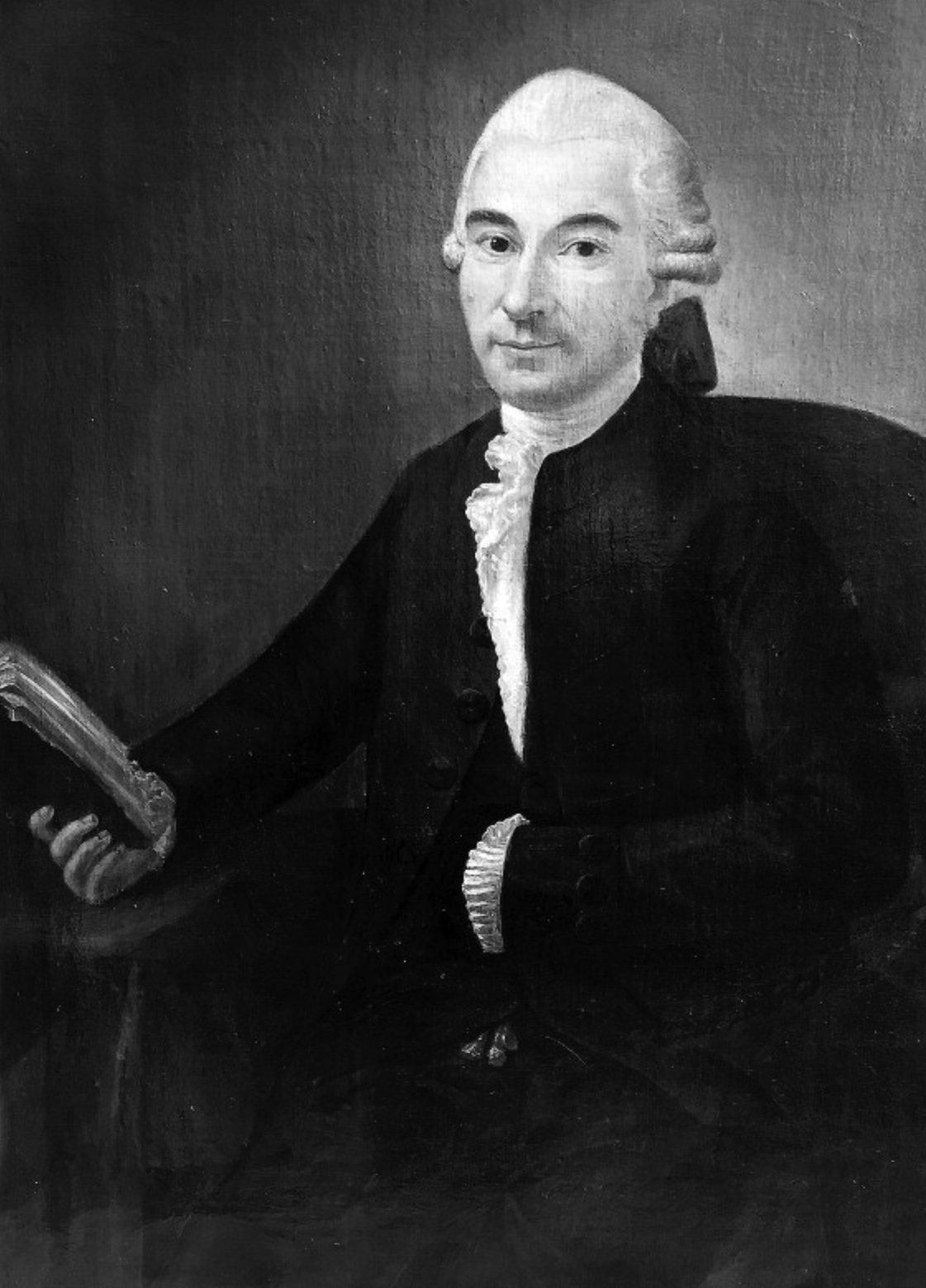
Michel Dieulafoy

Joseph-Marie-Armand-Michel Dieulafoy (1762, Toulouse – 13 December 1823) was a French librettist and playwright.

== Biography ==
He was received lawyer in Toulouse and he seemed destined to the bar where he had started. In his relatives, owners of large properties in the colonies drew him to the New World, and he moved to Santo Domingo where fortunate speculations already promised him a brilliant fortune. But the upheaval and emancipation of the Haitian Revolution destroyed his hopes: his house was burned down and his plantations were devastated by those who had formerly been enslaved there. He escaped the massacre du Cap in 1793 and fled to Philadelphia where he stayed there for a while, then returned to France where he devoted himself to dramatic poetry, mainly the vaudeville genre.

The Théâtre du Vaudeville (which was then located rue de Chartres) saw his success since 1798, that is to say at the time of his greatest vogue. He also gave various plays to most theaters of Paris.

Dieulafoy was and remained a royalist, even under the imperial government.

== Selected works ==
- 1798: Le Moulin de Sans Soucy, comédie en vaudeville, An VI in 8 II
- 1799: Le Quart d'heure de Rabelais, with Chrétien-Siméon Le Prévost d'Iray
- Jean Lafontaine, with the Prévost d'Iray
- 1800: Dans quel siècle sommes-nous ?, in one act, with Étienne de Jouy and Charles de Longchamps.
- 1801: Le Tableau des Sabines, 1-act comédie en vaudeville, with Jouy and Longchamps, written à propos Jacques-Louis David's The Intervention of the Sabine Women.
- Défiance et Malice, ou le Prêté-rendu, 1-act comedy in verse, premiered at the Théâtre Français de la République 17 fructidor an IX. This comedy with only two characters was met with much success. Originally performed by Saint-Fal and Joséphine Mézeray.
- 1819: Olympie, tragédie lyrique in three acts, music by Gaspare Spontini

== Bibliography ==
- Jacques-Alphonse Mahul, Annuaire nécrologique, ou Supplément annuel et continuation de toutes les biographies ou dictionnaires historiques, 4 année, 1823, Paris : Ponthieu, 1824, p. 104-107
