= Jean Mongrédien =

French musicologist (1932–2025)

Jean Mongrédien (19 June 1932 – 16 March 2025) was a French musicologist.

== Life and career ==
Mongrédien was born in Paris on 19 June 1932, the son of Georges Mongrédien.

A specialist of music of France of the eighteenth and nineteenth centuries, and especially opera and religious music, since 2001 Mongrédien had been professor emeritus at Paris-Sorbonne University where he held the chair of history of music and was dean of the Department of Musicology.

Mongrédien died on 16 March 2025, at the age of 92.

== Bibliography ==
- 1986: La Musique en France: des Lumières au Romantisme (1789–1830), Paris, Flammarion, 370 p., ISBN 2-08-064651-6
- 2008: Le Théâtre-Italien de Paris 1801-1831: Chronologie et documents, Marie-Hélène Coudroy-Saghai (collab.), Lyon, Symétrie, Venice, Palazzetto Bru Zane, series Perpetuum mobile, 8 volumes, 5384 p., ISBN 978-2-914373-30-2
