= Charles-Simon Catel =

French composer and educator (1773–1830)

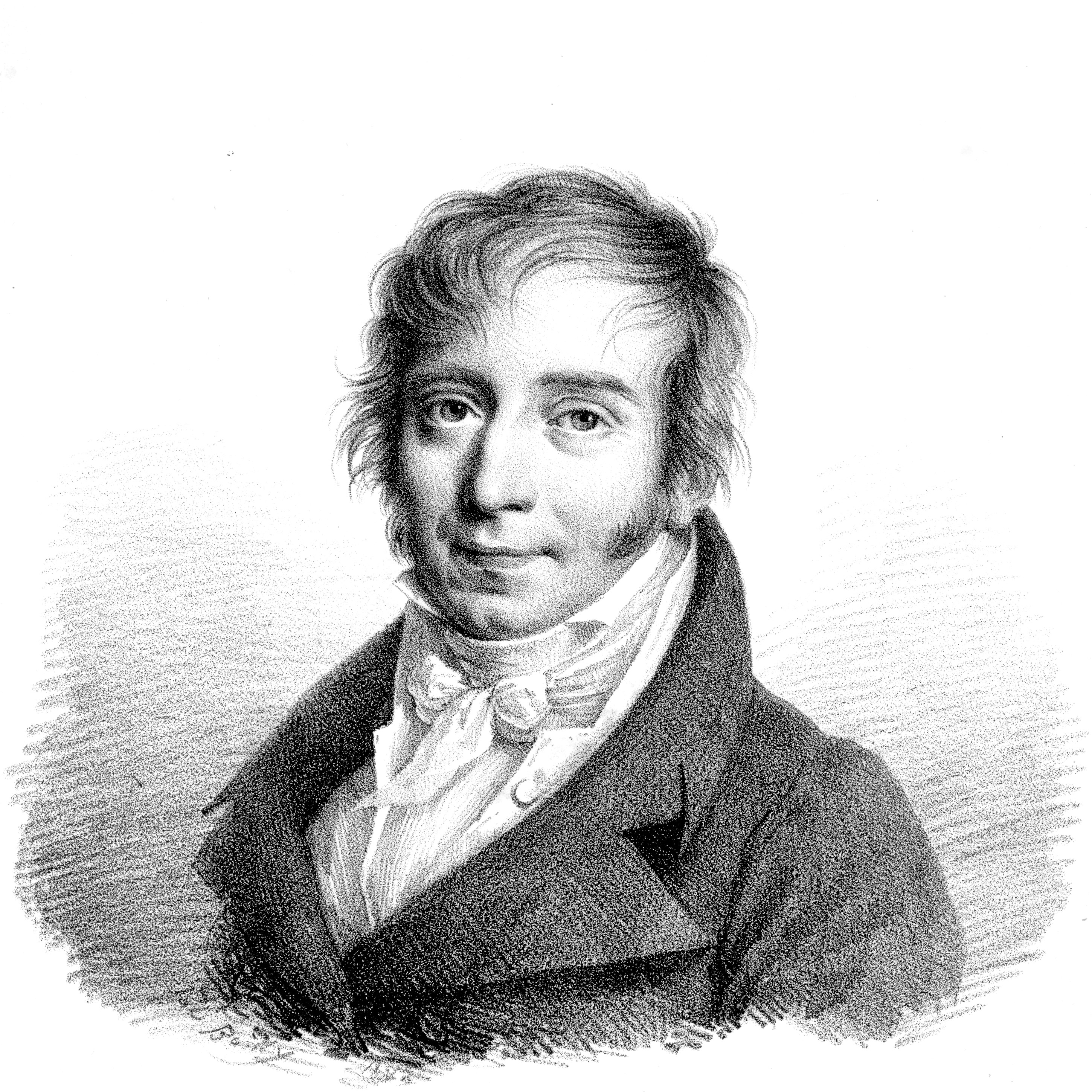
- Charles-Simon Catel, 1817, Bibliothèque nationale de France
- Born: June 10, 1773; L'Aigle, France
- Died: November 29, 1830 (aged 57); Paris, France
- Occupation(s): Composer and educator

Charles-Simon Catel (French: [ʃaʁl simɔ̃ katɛl]; 10 June 1773 – 29 November 1830) was a French composer and educator born at L'Aigle, Orne.

== Biography ==
Catel studied at the Royal School of Singing in Paris. He studied composition with François-Joseph Gossec and by the age of 16 became his chief assistant at the orchestra of the National Guard in 1790. A member of the Institute, he jointly composed pieces of military music for official state ceremonies, including L'Hymne à la Victoire (Victory Hymn), with words by Ponce-Denis Écouchard-Lebrun. He was appointed inaugural professor of harmony at the Conservatoire de Paris, but was relieved of his duties in 1814. Amongst his students were the Prix de Rome winning composers Joseph Daussoigne-Méhul and Victor Dourlen, the Belgian composer Martin-Joseph Mengal, and the famous, if eccentric, harpist Nicolas-Charles Bochsa. Catel died in Paris.

His works include a Treatise on Harmony (1802), which was used by the young Berlioz, several concert band works, several dramatic compositions at the Opéra National de Paris: Sémiramis, Les bayadères; at the Opéra-Comique: Artistes par occasion, L'Auberge de Bagnères (1807); Wallace (1817); symphonies, quartets etc.

== Works ==
=== Lyrical works ===
- Sémiramis, lyric tragedy in three acts, libretto by Philippe Desriaux based on Voltaire, performed by the Opéra de Paris on 4 May 1802.
- Les artistes par occasion, farcical opera in one act, libretto by Alexandre Duval, performed at the Opéra-Comique in 1807.
- L'auberge de Bagnères, farcical opera in 3 acts, libretto by C. Jalabert, performed by the Opéra-Comique in 1807.
- Les bayadères, opera in 3 acts, libretto by Victor-Joseph-Étienne de Jouy based on Voltaire, performed at Opéra de Paris on 8 August 1810.
- Les aubergistes de qualité, comedy in 3 acts, libretto by Victor-Joseph-Étienne de Jouy, performed at Opéra-Comique on 17 June 1812
- Bayard à Mézières, comedy in one act, libretto by Alisvan de Chazet and Louis Emmanuel Mercier Dupaty, performed at Opéra-Comique in 1814.
- Le premier en date, comedy in one act, libretto by Marc-Antoine Désaugiers and Pessey, performed at Opéra-Comique in 1814.
- Wallace ou Le ménestrel écossais, epic opera in 3 acts, libretto by L. Ch. J. Fontanes de Saint-Marcellin, performed at Opéra-Comique in 1817.
- Zirphile et fleur de myrte ou cent ans en un jour, "opéra-féerie" in 2 acts, libretto by Victor-Joseph-Étienne de Jouy and Nicolas Lefebvre, performed at Opéra de Paris in 1818.
- L'officier enlevé, comedy in one act, libretto by Alexandre Duval, performed at Opéra-Comique in 1819.

=== Vocal and choral works ===
- Chant triomphal, 1807.
- Ode sur le Vaisseau Le Vengeur, words by Ponce-Denis Écouchard-Lebrun, for euphonium and orchestra.
- Hymne sur la reconquête de Toulon, for male choir and orchestra.
