= La vestale (Spontini) =

Opera by Gaspare Spontini

- Tragédie lyrique by Gaspare Spontini
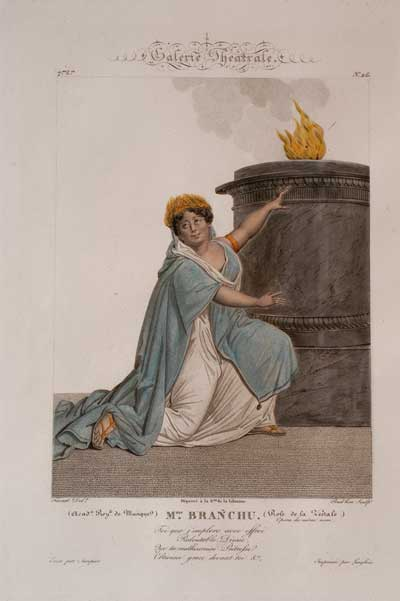
- Caroline Branchu in the title role of Julia, on a poster for the premiere
- Translation: The Vestal Virgin
- Librettist: Étienne de Jouy
- Language: French
- Premiere: 15 December 1807; Salle Montansier, Paris

La vestale (The Vestal Virgin) is an opera composed by Gaspare Spontini to a French libretto by Étienne de Jouy. It takes the form of a tragédie lyrique in three acts. It was first performed on 15 December 1807 by the Académie Impériale de Musique (Paris Opera) at the Salle Montansier and is regarded as Spontini's masterpiece. The musical style shows the influence of Gluck and anticipates the works of Berlioz, Wagner, and French Grand opera.

== Composition history ==
Spontini had finished La vestale by the summer of 1805 but had faced opposition from leading members of the Opéra and rivalry from fellow composers. The premiere was made possible with the help of Spontini's patron, the Empress Joséphine, but only after being rearranged by Jean-Baptiste Rey and Louis-Luc Loiseau de Persuis. La vestale was an enormous success, enjoying over two hundred performances by 1830.

== Performance history ==
Its fame soon spread abroad; it appeared in Naples and in Vienna in 1811. The full piano score with lyrics in French and German was sold in Germany in 1812, as well as the score for an aria and a duet. In 1814 the opera was performed in Budapest followed by Madrid (translated into Spanish) in 1817 and Stockholm in 1823. It was premiered in the United States in French at Théâtre d'Orléans in New Orleans on 17 February 1828. Wagner conducted the work in Dresden in 1844 with Wilhelmine Schröder-Devrient.

Important 20th-century revivals include those for Rosa Ponselle at the Met in 1925-26 and the Maggio Musicale Fiorentino in 1933, for Maria Caniglia in Rome, 1942, and the 1954 production at La Scala with Maria Callas in the title role, which was the first opera staging by the film director Luchino Visconti. There followed other revivals for leading sopranos; Leyla Gencer in Palermo, 1969 and Rome, 1973; Renata Scotto in Florence, 1970; Montserrat Caballé in Barcelona in 1982; and Raina Kabaivanska in Genoa in 1984. Muti reproduced the original version at La Scala in 1993, and English National Opera mounted the opera in London in 2002.

A very memorable performance, on a slippery stage, on the last night of the Wexford Opera Festival in 1979 is described by Bernard Levin.

La vestale is famous in historical terms but is only very infrequently performed. Two of its arias (translated to Italian and recorded by Maria Callas and Rosa Ponselle), "Tu che invoco" and "O nume tutelar", are better known than the work as a whole. In recognition of its role in the development of Richard Wagner's third opera, Rienzi, it was performed in concert form in Dresden's Semperoper in the Summer of 2013, conducted by Gabriele Ferro and starring Francisco Araiza as Cinna, Maria Agresta as Julia, and baritone Christopher Magiera as Licinius.

A parody was staged in Paris in 1808, set in a hatmaker's shop.

== Roles ==
Roles, voice types, premiere cast
Role	Voice type	Premiere cast, 15 December 1807 Conductor: Jean-Baptiste Rey
Licinius, Roman general	tenor	Étienne Lainez
Cinna, head of a legion	tenor	François Lays or Lay
Chief Priest	bass	Henri-Étienne Dérivis
Julia, young vestal	soprano	Alexandrine-Caroline Branchu
The Great Vestal	mezzo-soprano	Marie-Thérèse Maillard
Chief of the Aruspices	bass	Duparc
A consul	bass	Martin

== Synopsis ==
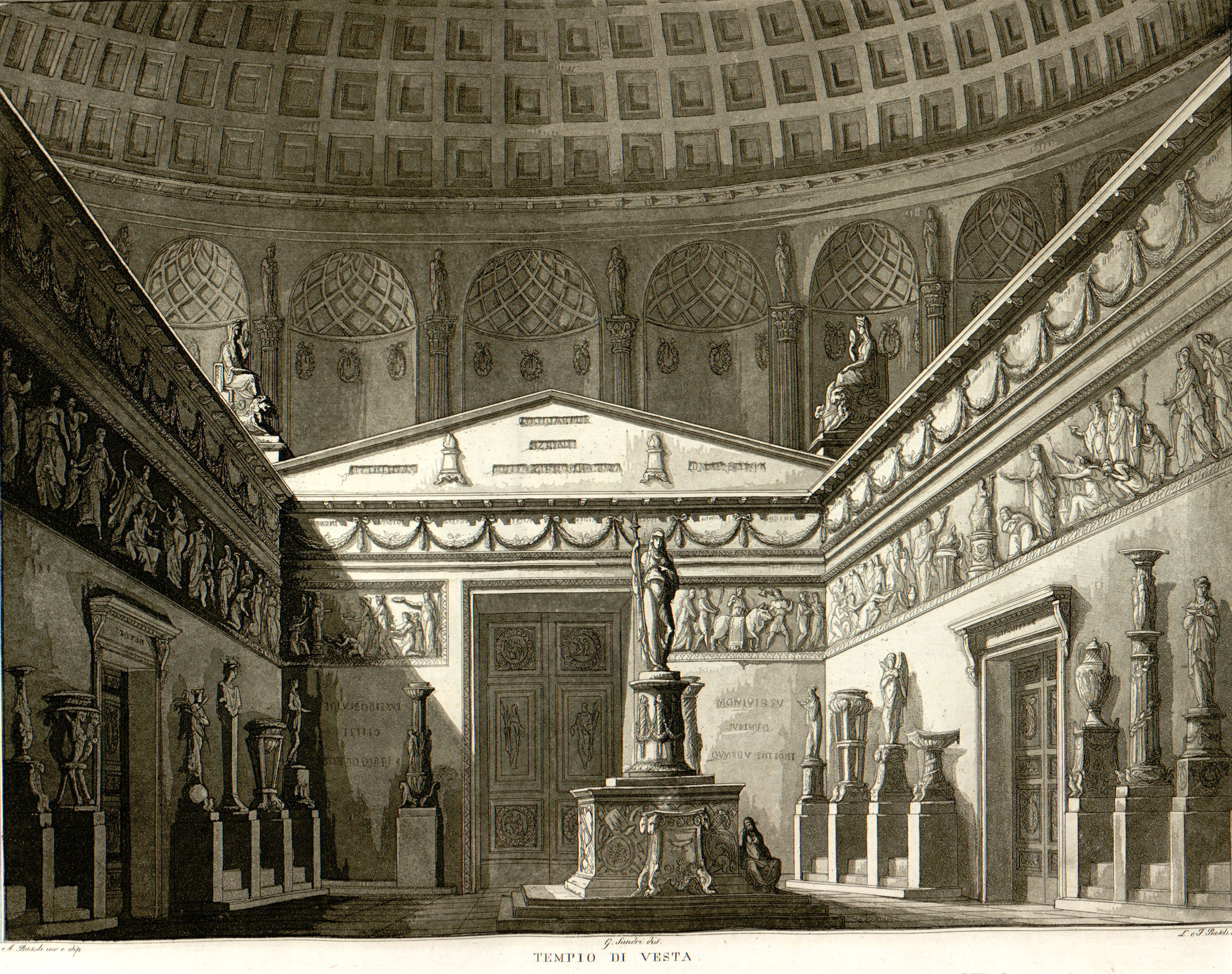
Set design by Antonio Basoli

Place: Rome
About 269 BC

=== Act 1 ===
Returning to Rome after a victorious campaign, Licinius finds his beloved Julia has become a priestess of Vesta. Although Julia attempts to avoid going to Licinius's triumph, she is delegated to present him with a wreath. He tells her that he intends to kidnap and reclaim her.

=== Act 2 ===
In the temple of Vesta, Julia guards the eternal flame and prays to be freed of temptation. Licinius arrives; during their rapturous reconciliation, the flame expires. Licinius is advised by Cinna to flee. Julia is interrogated by the high priest but refuses to name Licinius. She is sentenced to death for licentiousness.

=== Act 3 ===
Despite the pleas of Licinius, Julia is to be buried alive; even when he admits his intrusion to the Temple, Julia claims not to recognise him. A thunderstorm ensues, during which lightning reignites the sacred flame. Recognising this as a sign from the gods, the High Priest and Vestal Priestess release Julia, who is then married to Licinius.

== Recordings ==
- Sung in Italian – Maria Vitale, Elena Nicolai, Renato Gavarini, Alfredo Fineschi, Giuliano Ferrein, Albino Gagi – Chorus and Orchestra della Rai di Roma, conducted by Fernando Previtali (Warner Fonit, 1951)
- Sung in Italian – Maria Callas, Ebe Stignani, Franco Corelli, Nicola Rossi-Lemeni, Enzo Sordello – Teatro alla Scala Chorus and Orchestra, Milano, conducted by Antonino Votto (Warner Classics, 1954)
- Sung in Italian – Leyla Gencer, Franca Mattiucci, Robleto Merolla, Teatro Massimo di Palermo orchestra and chorus conducted by Fernando Previtali (1969 various labels)
- Sung in French – Rosalind Plowright, Gisella Pasino, Francisco Araiza, Bavarian Radio Chorus, Munich Radio Orchestra, conducted by Gustav Kuhn (Orfeo, 1991)
- Sung in French – Karen Huffstodt, Denyce Graves, Anthony Michaels-Moore, Dimitri Kavrakos, Chorus and Orchestra of La Scala, conducted by Riccardo Muti (Sony, 1993)
- Sung in French - Marina Rebeka, Stanislas de Barbeyrac, Aude Extrémo, Les Talens Lyriques conducted by Christophe Rousset with the Flemish Radio Choir. (Centre de musique romantique française/Palazzetto Bru Zane, 2023)
- Sung in French – Elza van den Heever, Michael Spyres, Ève‑Maud Hubeaux, Julien Behr, Jean Teitgen, Florent Mbia, Chorus and Orchestra of the Paris Opera, conducted by Bertrand de Billy (OperaVision, 2024)

== See also ==
- Witi Ihimaera's poem composed for the opening of the British Museum's 1998 Māori exhibit is titled "O nume tutelar", alluding to "O des infortunés déesse tutélaire" in act 2.
