= Alexandrine-Caroline Branchu =

French opera soprano (1780–1850)

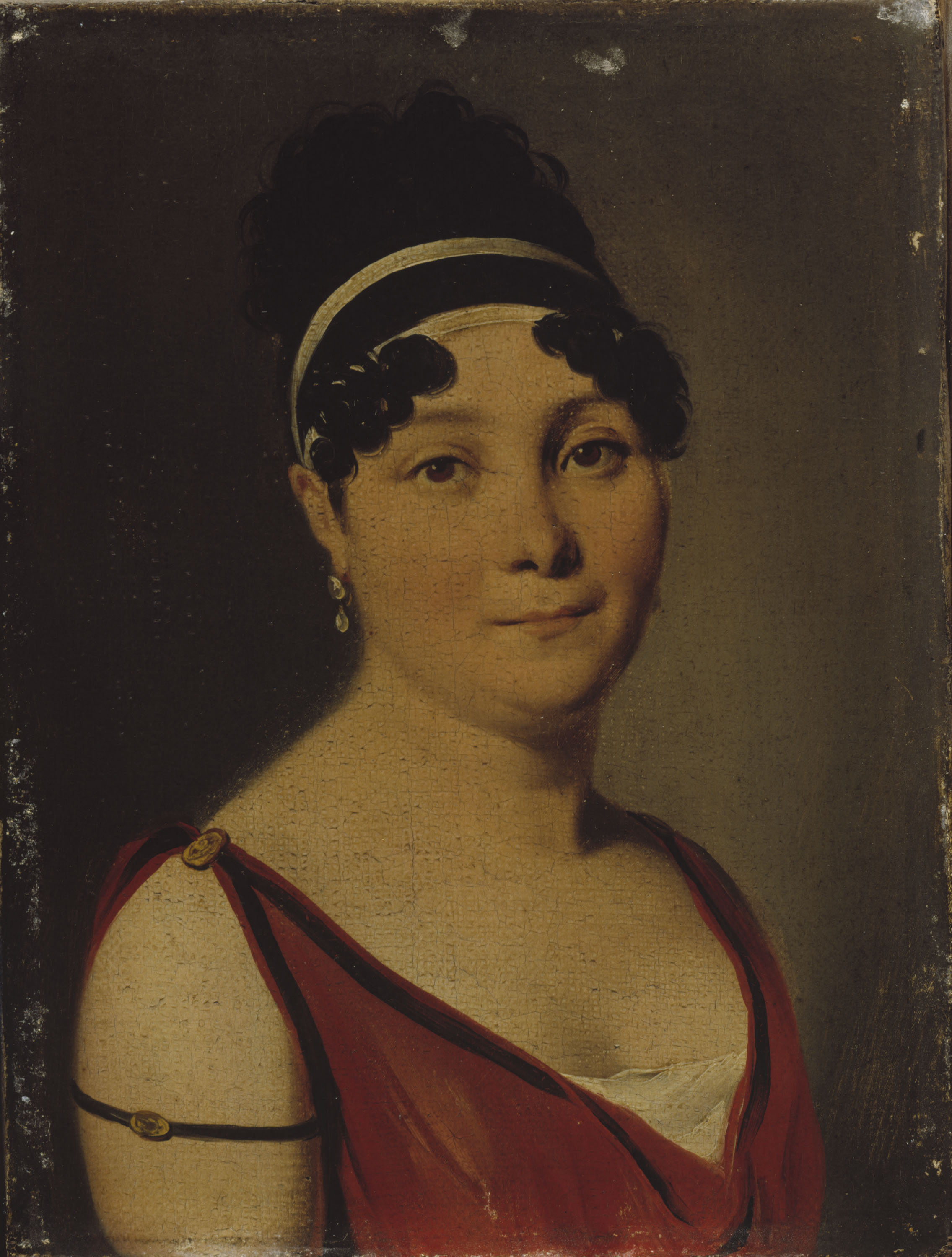
Portrait by Louis-Léopold Boilly, c. 1810

Thimoléone-Rose-Caroline Chevalier Lavit, known by her married name as Alexandrine-Caroline (or Caroline or simply Mme) Branchu (2 November 1780 – 14 October 1850) was a French opera soprano with origins from the free people of colour of Saint-Domingue where she was born at Cap-Français, the former French colony which is the modern-day Cap-Haïtien, Haiti. A gifted vocalist, for the better part of the first quarter of the 19th century, she was a leading soprano at the Paris Opéra.

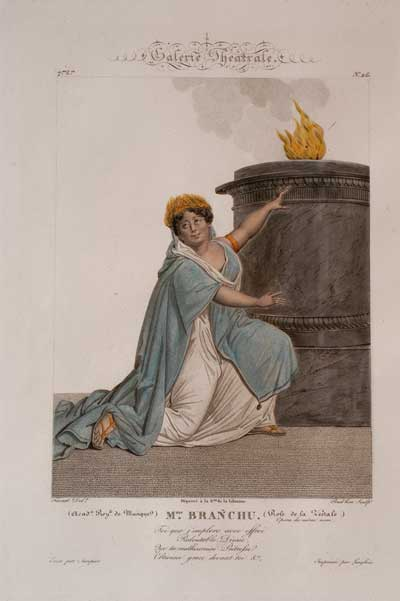
Caroline Branchu in the rôle of Julie in La Vestale by Gaspare Spontini, 1807

Branchu was one of the first students at the Paris Conservatoire after it opened in 1795, and studied singing under Pierre Garat.

Although Branchu frequently performed works by Christoph Willibald Gluck and was notable for roles in Anacréon and Les Abencérages by Luigi Cherubini, she is best remembered for her performances in the title role of Gaspare Spontini's most important opera, La vestale (1807). She also performed in Spontini's Fernand Cortez (1809) and Olympie (1819). She was briefly a mistress of Napoleon.

Branchu died in the Parisian suburb of Passy and was buried in the Père Lachaise Cemetery.
