= Louis-Luc Loiseau de Persuis =

French violinist, conductor, choirmaster, teacher, composer, and theatre director

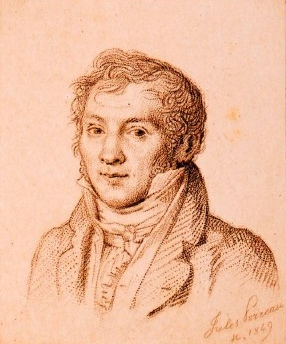
Louis-Luc Loiseau de Persuis Engraving by Jules Porreau (1849)

Louis-Luc Loiseau de Persuis (4 July 1769 – 20 December 1819) was a French violinist, conductor, choirmaster, teacher, composer, and theatre director.

After commencing his studies of music in his hometown of Metz, Persuis moved to Paris in 1787, and entered the orchestra of the Opéra in 1793. His entire career was within this institution; he became choirmaster in 1803, then conductor in 1810, replacing Jean-Baptiste Rey. He simultaneously worked in administrative rôles, as manager, musical inspector-general (1816), stage manager (1817), then chief director from 3 September 1817 until 13 November 1819, on which date illness forced him to resign.

Persuis composed ballets, operas, and opéras comiques. His greatest success was Le triomphe de Trajan (1807), written in collaboration with Le Sueur. From 1810 to 1815, Persuis was the most performed composer at the Opéra, with 157 performances, largely due to Trajan. His opéras comiques found favour at the Théâtre Favart. He also adapted others' works, for example the oratorio Les Croisés (Die Befreyung von Jerusalem, 1813) by Maximilian Stadler.

Persuis taught singing at the Conservatoire de Paris until 1802. His name was proposed for a singing school at the Opéra, but the school was not established, although he continued to teach choristers informally.

He died in Paris.

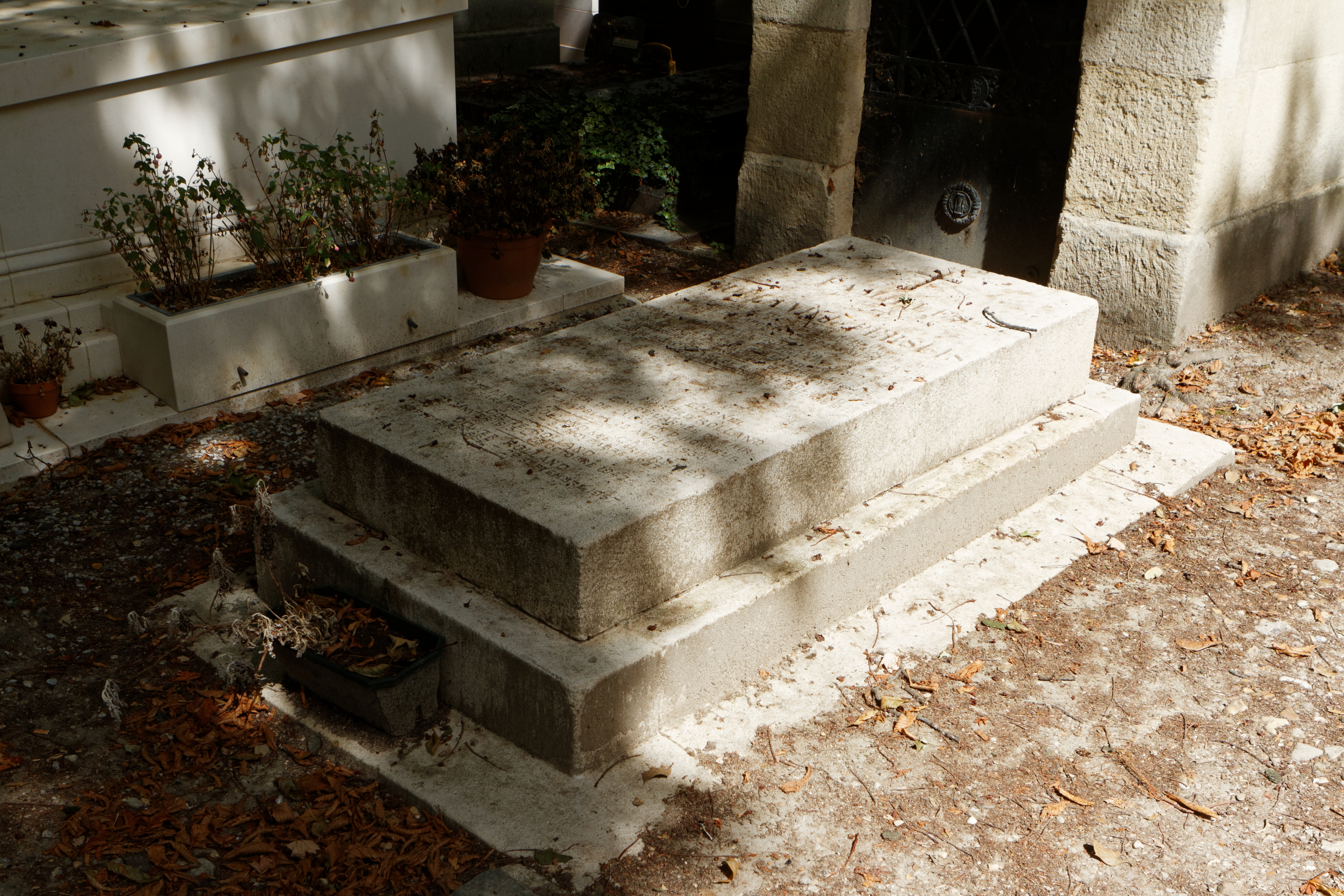
Grave at père Lachaise Cemetery

== Works for the stage ==
Title	Genre	Acts	Libretto	Premiere date	Venue
La nuit espagnole	opéra-comique	unknown	J. Fiévée	14 June 1791	Théâtre Feydeau
Estelle	opéra-comique	3 acts	Villebrune	17 December 1793	Théâtre National
Phanor et Angéla	opéra-comique	3 acts	Faur	July 1798	Théâtre Feydeau
Léonidas, ou Les spartiates (with Gresnick)	opera	unknown	Pixérécourt	15 August 1799	Opéra, [[Théâtre National de la rue de la Loi|Théâtre des Arts]]
Fanny Morna, ou L'écossaise	drame-lyrique	3 acts	E. Favières	22 August 1799	Opéra-Comique, Salle Favart I
Le fruit défendu	opera	1 act	E. Gosse	7 March 1800	Opéra-Comique, Salle Favart I
Marcel, ou L'héritier supposé	opéra-comique	1 act	Pixérécourt	12 February 1801	Opéra-Comique, Salle Favart I
L'inauguration du Temple de la victoire (with Le Sueur)	tragédie-lyrique	1 act	Baour-Lormain, Gardel (choreography)	2 January 1807	Opéra, Théâtre des Arts
Le retour d’Ulysse	ballet	3 acts	Milon (choreography)	24 February 1807	Opéra, Théâtre des Arts
Le triomphe de Trajan (with Le Sueur)	tragédie-lyrique	3 acts	J. Esménard, Gardel (choreography)	23 October 1807	Opéra, Théâtre des Arts
La Jérusalem délivrée	tragédie-lyrique	5 acts	P.-M. Baour-Lormain after T. Tasso, Gardel (choreography)	15 September 1812	Opéra, Théâtre des Arts
Nina, ou La folle par amour	ballet	2 acts	Milon (choreography)	23 November 1813	Opéra, Théâtre des Arts
L’épreuve villageoise, ou André et Denise	ballet	2 acts	Milon (choreography)	4 April 1815	Opéra, Théâtre des Arts
L’heureux retour (with Berton and Kreutzer)	opéra-ballet	1 act	Milon (choreography)	25 July 1815	Opéra, Théâtre des Arts
Le carnaval de Venise, ou La constance à l'épreuve (with Kreutzer)	ballet	2 acts	Milon (choreography)	22 February 1816	Opéra, Théâtre des Arts
Les dieux rivaux, ou Les fêtes de Cythère (with Berton, Kreutzer, and Spontini)	opéra-ballet	1 act	M. Dieulafoy and C. Briffaut	21 June 1816	Opéra, Théâtre des Arts
Der Zauberschlaf (with A. Gyrowetz [Act 2])	ballet	2 acts	Aumer (choreography)	16 January 1818	Vienna, Hoftheater

Preceded by Alexandre-Étienne Choron	director of the Académie royale de musique 1817-1819	Succeeded by Giovanni Battista Viotti
