= Théâtre National (rue de la Loi) =

Theatre of the Paris Opera from 1794 to 1820

Coordinates: 48.8680°N 2.3376°E

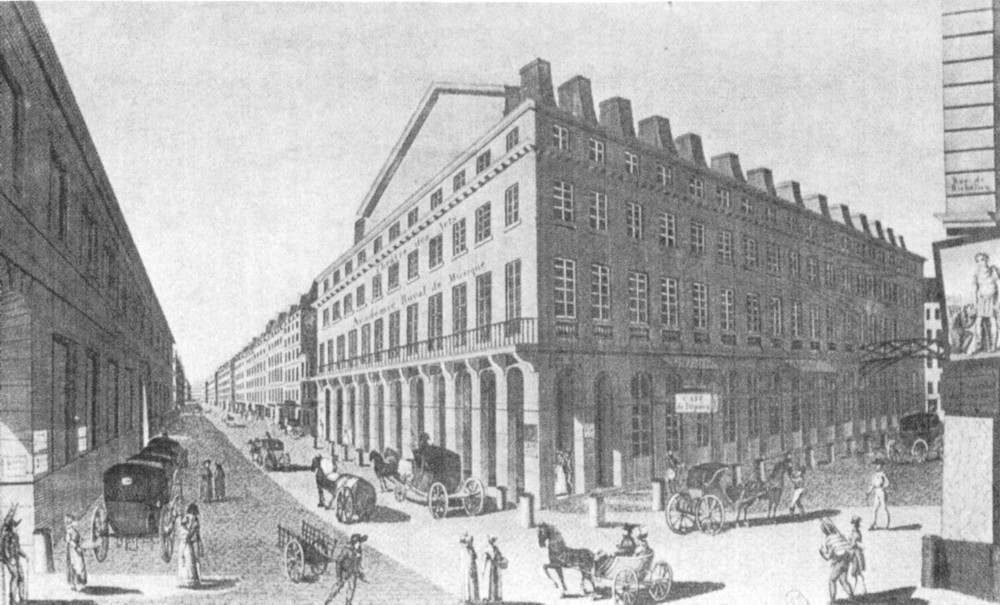
Théâtre National de la rue de la Loi

The Théâtre National (French pronunciation: [teɑtʁ nɑsjɔnal]), later the Théâtre des Arts, was a Parisian theatre located across from the Bibliothèque Nationale de France on the rue de la Loi, which was the name of the rue de Richelieu from 1793 to 1806. It was the home of the Paris Opera from 1794 to 1820, after which it was demolished.

== History ==
The theatre was built by the actress and theatre manageress Mademoiselle Montansier, and opened on 15 August 1793. Other names have included Salle de la rue de la Loi, Salle de la rue de Richelieu, Salle Montansier, and Théâtre Montansier, although the latter two names have also been used to refer to two other theatres built and/or managed by Montansier: the Théâtre Montansier in Versailles and the Théâtre du Palais-Royal.

The Théâtre National was designed by the architect Victor Louis and had a capacity of 2,300 spectators. The management and audiences had several criticisms of the design of the theatre. Despite the high seating capacity, the building felt "cramped", the backstage areas were "miserable", and the lighting and ventilation inadequate. It was remodeled in 1808.

The theatre served as the principal home of the Paris Opera from 26 July 1794 to 13 February 1820 during which time it was known variously as the Théâtre des Arts (1794), the Théâtre de la République et des Arts (1797), again as Théâtre des Arts (1803), the Académie Impériale de Musique (1804), the Académie Royale de Musique (1814), again as Académie Impériale de Musique during the Hundred Days of Napoleon, and finally again as the Académie Royale de Musique (1815–1820). The theatre has also been referred to as the Montansier opera house.

Premieres included Giovanni Paisiello's Proserpine (29 March 1803), Luigi Cherubini's Anacreon (4 October 1803), and Gaspare Spontini's La vestale (16 December 1807) and Fernand Cortez (28 November 1809).

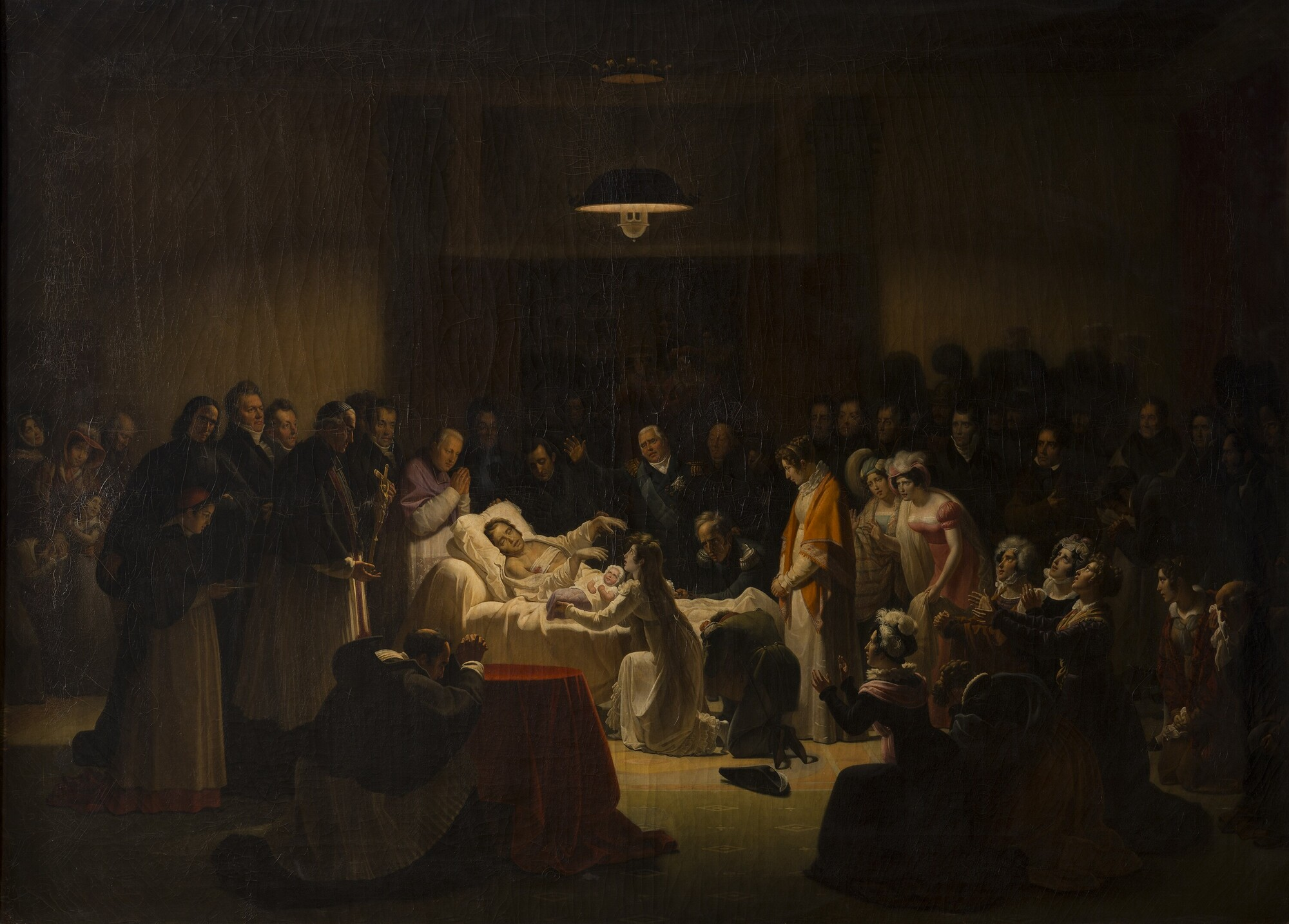
The Death of the Duke of Berry by Alexandre Menjaud, 1824

Following the assassination of Charles Ferdinand, Duke of Berry in 1820, who had been leaving after a performance, King Louis XVIII ordered the theatre's closure and demolition. Its former site is now the Square Louvois.

== Architectural drawings ==
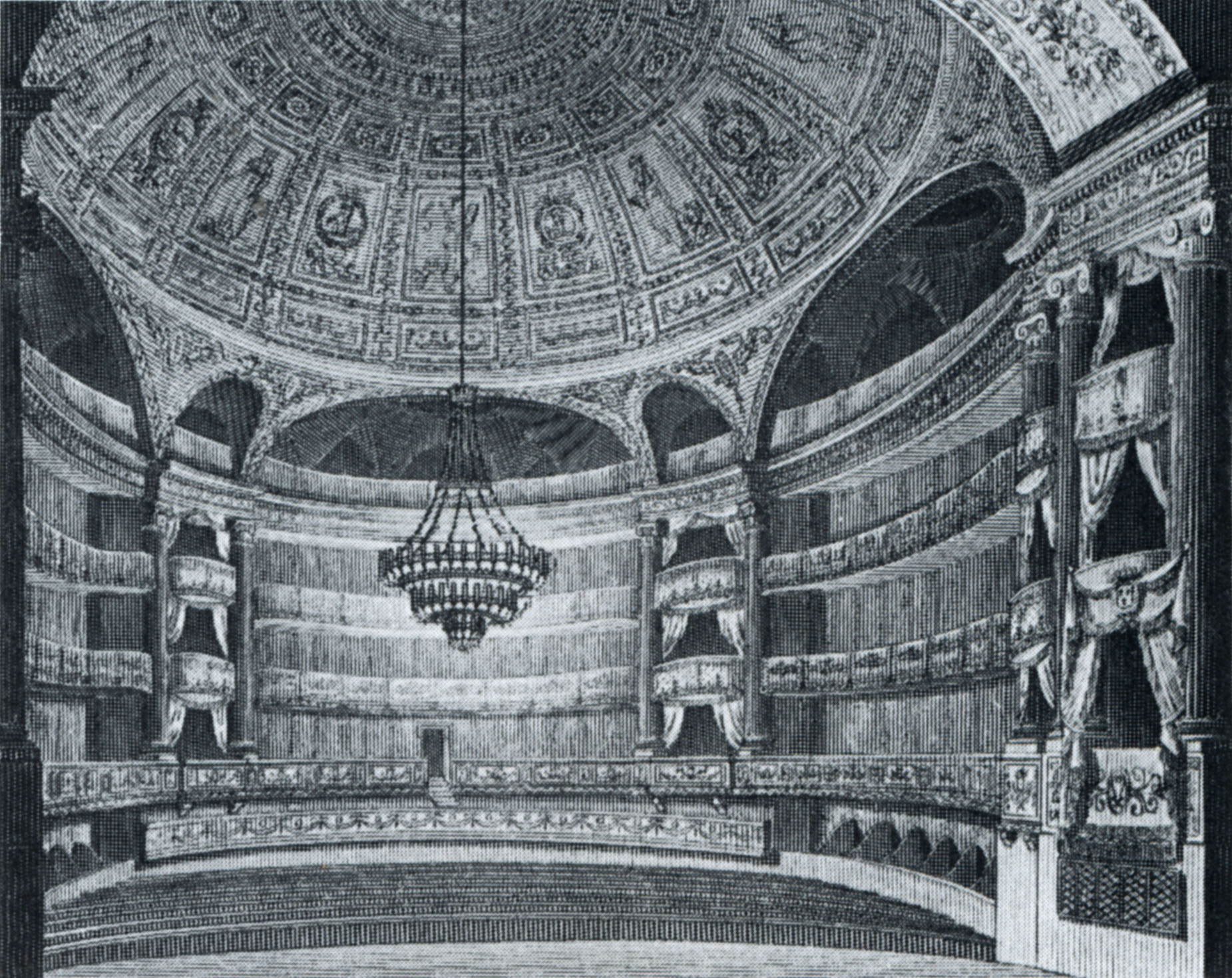
View of the auditorium (1821)

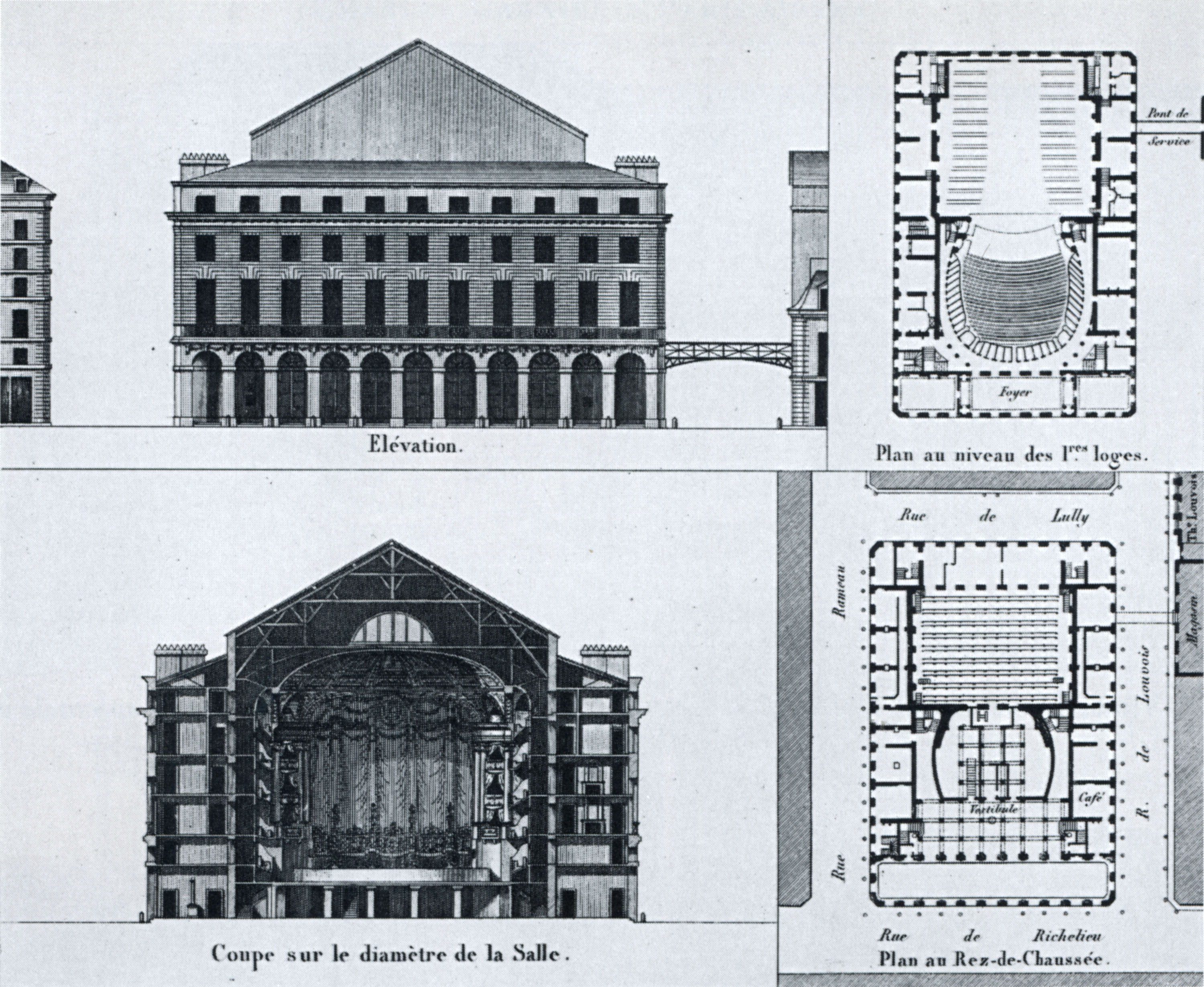
Elevation, section, and plans (1821)

== Sources ==
- Donnet, Alexis; Orgiazzi, J. (1821). Architectonographie des théâtres de Paris, plates volume, plates 13 and 14. Paris: Didot l'ainé. Scanned by Google Books. Credit: Ghent University Library.
- Pitou, Spire (1983) The Paris Opéra: an encyclopedia of operas, ballets, composers, and performers (3 volumes), vol. 1, p. 38. Westport, Connecticut: Greenwood Press. ISBN 978-0-686-46036-7.
- Simeone, Nigel (2000). Paris: a musical gazetteer. Yale University Press. ISBN 978-0-300-08053-7.
- Whitaker, G. B. (1827). The History of Paris from the earliest period to the present day: containing a description of its antiquities, public buildings, civil, religious, scientific, and commercial institutions (3 volumes). London: G. B. Whitaker. View volume 2 at Google Books.
