= Victoire Saulnier =

French ballet dancer (b. 1770)

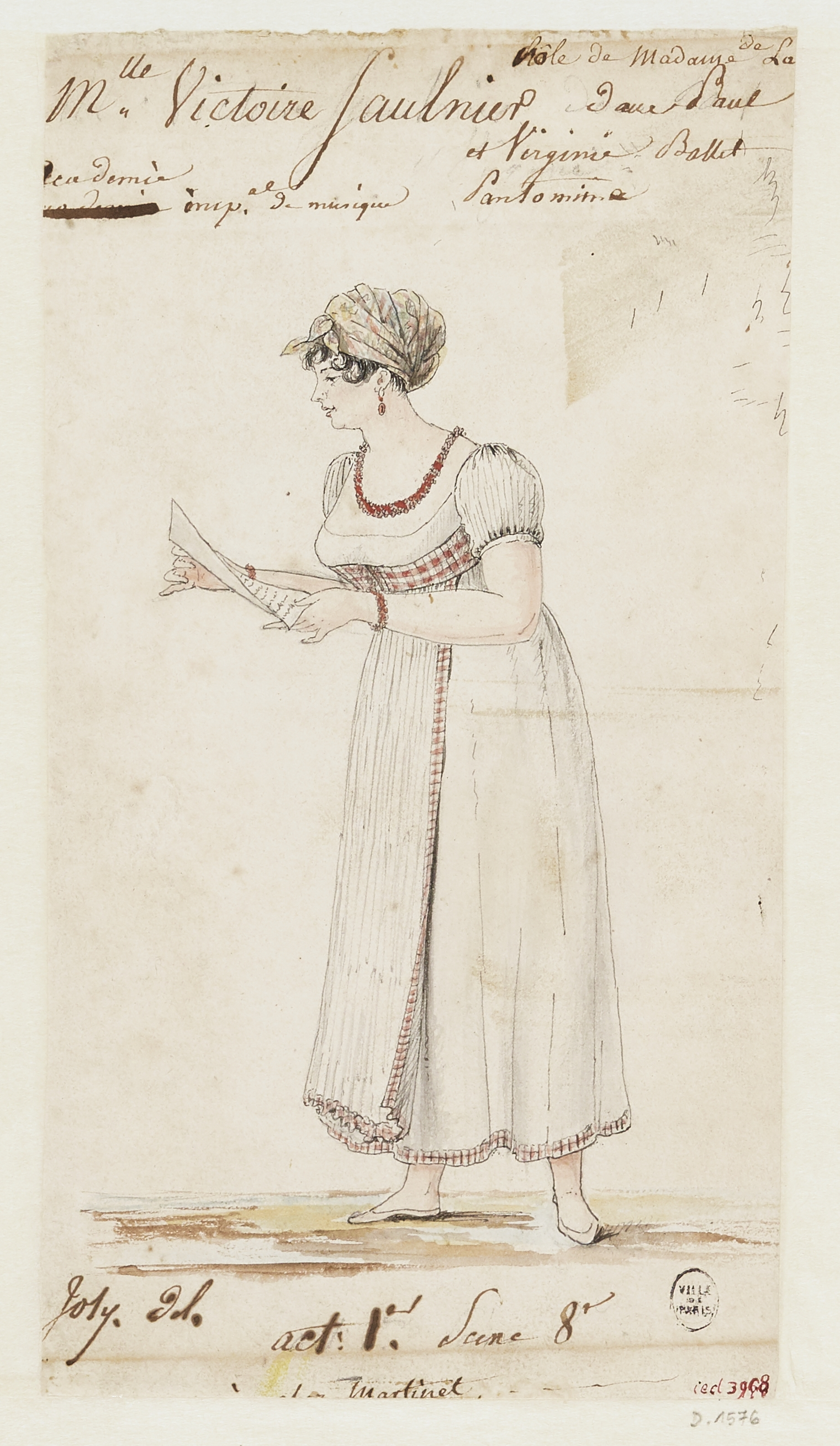
- Born: Victoire Saulnier c. 1770; Paris, France
- Died: France
- Other names: Mlle Victoire Saulnier; Mademoiselle Victoire Saulnier
- Occupations: Dancer; Actor
- Years active: 1784

Victoire Saulnier (born c. 1770), known professionally as Mlle Victoire Saulnier was an 18th-century French ballet dancer who performed at the Opéra de Paris in France and the King's Theatre in London.

== Early life ==
Victoire Saulnier was born in Paris around the late 1760s to early 1770s. She was a sibling to fellow ballerina Marie-Jeanne Saulnier known as "Mimi" or "Mlle Saulnier".

== Entertainment life ==
Saulnier was a pupil of Maximilien Gardel who served as a master of the ballets at the Paris Opéra. She succeeded German ballerina Anne Heinel in the noble genre.

On 11 March 1784 Saulnier, at just under fifteen years old, made her official debut to Parisian audiences at the Académie Royale de Musique (known as Paris Opéra).

For the 1789 season she danced under Jean-Georges Noverre's direction, who was serving as ballet master at King's Theatre in London. In 1789, riots at King's Theatre, London's top venue for foreign opera and dance, led Giovanni Gallini to recruit new performers mid-season, such as Mlle Victoire, Mlle Guimard, and Mons. Nivelon. On 17 March 1789, Mlle Victoire Saulnier made her first appearance in England alongside Didelot, Beaupré, Duquesney, Nivelon, Mlle Emilie Colombe, and Mlle Adelaide. She made London appearances until May 1789.

Starring in Noverre's Diane et Endymion in 1791, Saulnier debuted a filmy, form-revealing tunic.

Saulnier was replaced in the noble genre at the Opéra in 1794 by Clotilde.

On 12 June 1806 Saulnier performed in Paul et Virginie, a ballet-pantomime by Pierre Gardel. She was cast as "Madame de Latour (Virginie's mother)" with Madame Gardel portraying "Virginie."

In 1807 she was described by Jean-Georges Noverre with the following statement: "Miss Victoire Saulnier is of an elegant figure she is as beautiful as Venus but the Graces, the Laughter, the Games, and the Pleasures are not in her train. I advise her to call them and invoke Therpsicore. With application and zeal she will acquire all that she lacks".

Saulnier performed as "Juno (Jupiter's daughter)" in Gardel and Méhul's Persée et Andromède on 8 June 1810. The following year on 8 April 1811, she performed in Saiil.

She performed in Gardel and Luigi Cherubini's Achille à Scyros in 1812. In the role of "Thétis", she portrayed the daughter of Heaven and Earth, wife of Oceanus, and mother of Achilles (played by Albert).

On 15 September 1812 Saulnier danced as one of the "Nymphs de la Volupté" in act two of the opera Jerusalem Delivered (Jérusalem délivrée).

== Death ==
Saulnier died in France in the 19th century.
