= Beaupré (dancer) =

French dancer and mime artist (1758–1842)

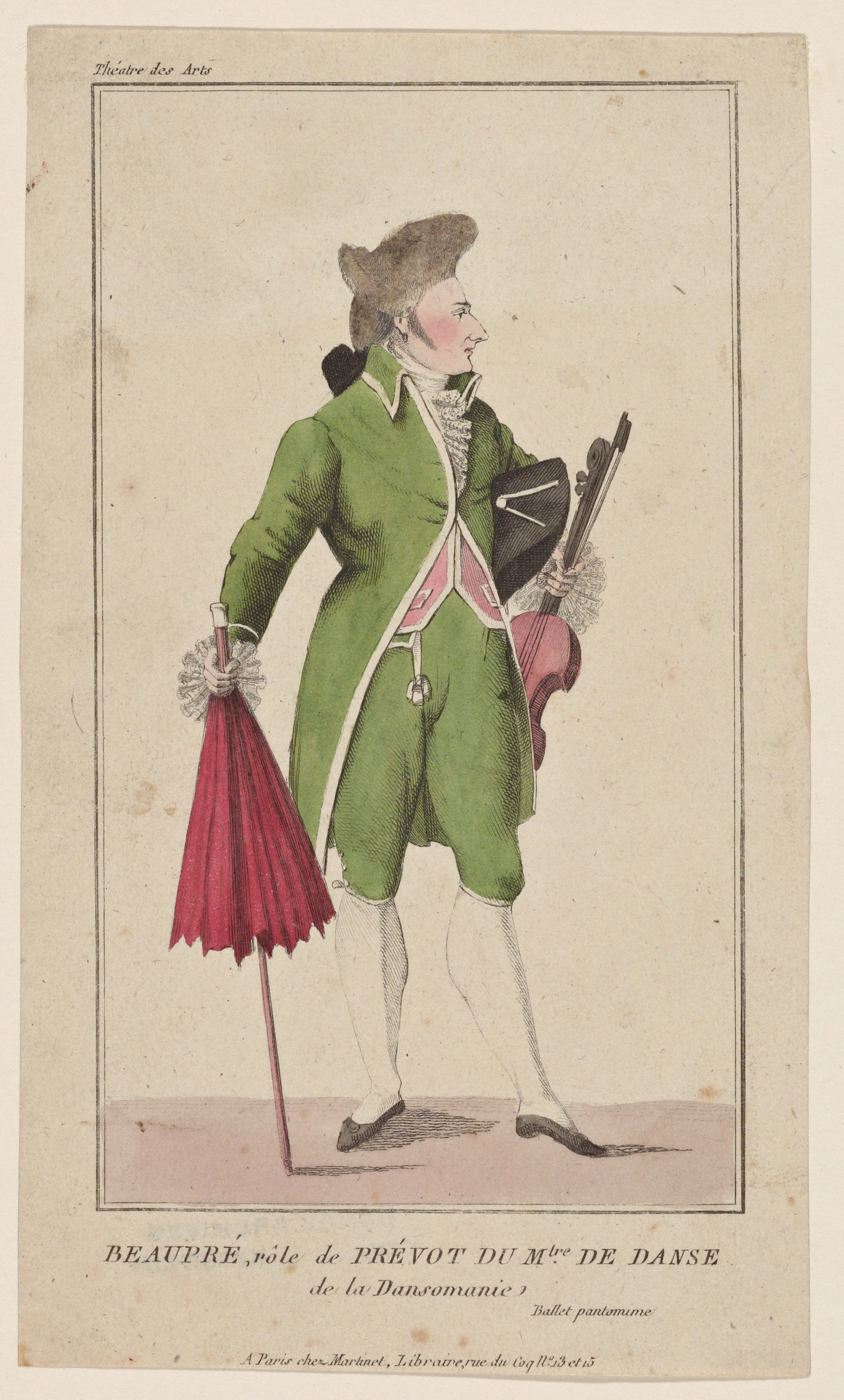
- Born: Charles-François Richer de la Rigaudière c. 1758; Paris, France
- Died: 1842; Paris, France
- Other name: Charles Beaupré
- Occupations: Dancer; Actor

Charles-François Richer de la Rigaudière or Charles Beaupré (c. 1758–1842), known professionally as Beaupré, was an 18th-century French ballet dancer, pantomimist, and dance teacher who performed at the Opéra de Paris for nearly 30 years.

== Early life ==
Named Charles-François Richer de la Rigaudière, he was born around 1758 in Paris, France.

On 8 June 1781, a fire at the Théâtre du Palais-Royal claimed the life of his brother Pierre Richer de la Rigaudière, who was born in Paris and died at 27. A member of the Académie Royale de Musique, he had been living with Charles at their mother's home.

== Entertainment life ==
Known on stage as Beaupré, he made his debut in 1789 at the Académie Royale de Musique (now Paris Opéra). He was peers with Louis-Stanislas Montjoie, Albert, Ferdinand, Clotilde Mafleuroy, Émilie Bigottini, and Fanny Bias. He had attained the rank of Premier sujet (roughly corresponding to Danseur étoile) and specialized in the comic genre at the Opéra.

=== Performances ===
During the 1790s, Beaupré pioneered the role of the Demi-caractère genre at the Opéra. He took on a mix of prominent and supporting roles in several of Pierre Gardel's pantomimic ballets, such as La dansomanie, L'enfant prodigue, Paul et Virginie, and Le Carnaval de Venise. Beaupré danced as "Domingo" in Gardel's ballet, Paul et Virginie, premiered at the Paris Opéra on 24 June 1806. On 13 October 1809, he portrayed the Provost in Gardel and Méhul's La dansomanie, sharing the stage with Milon, Vestris, and Mme. Gardel.

On 8 August 1810, he debuted in the premiere of Les bayadères, with music by Charles-Simon Catel and choreography by Gardel and Louis Milon. Appointed as premier sujet, he danced in the role of a juggler in act three alongside Vestris and Mlle Bigottini. The Parisian dancer performed in Charles Didelot's romantic ballet Flore et Zéphire on 12 December 1815, taking on the role of "Pan". Beaupré was cast as "Arlequin" in a two-act ballet titled Le Carnaval de Venise by Louis Milon on 22 February 1816.

=== Retirement ===
He appeared on the Opéra stage until he was sixty years old. The role of Crispin in the ballet Crispin rival de son maître, performed on 15 December 1818, was his final comedic act before retiring. Beaupré was the first retired subject of the Académie Royale de Musique. The Royal Academy faced the challenge of replacing Beaupré, whose departure jeopardized their repertoire of comic performances. His successor, Louis-Theodore Capelle was found in London. The veteran dancer was granted a pension in recognition of his service.

In 1824, Beaupré was granted authorization to offer dance lessons to students at the École Polytechnique. During his retirement in 1827, Beaupré composed A Short Essay on the French Danse de Société. It described the techniques used by the French dancer to instruct Quadrille dancing. Beaupré provided dance instruction to many French and English nobles who traveled to Paris.

== Death ==
Charles Beaupré died in Paris, France in 1842.

== Gallery ==
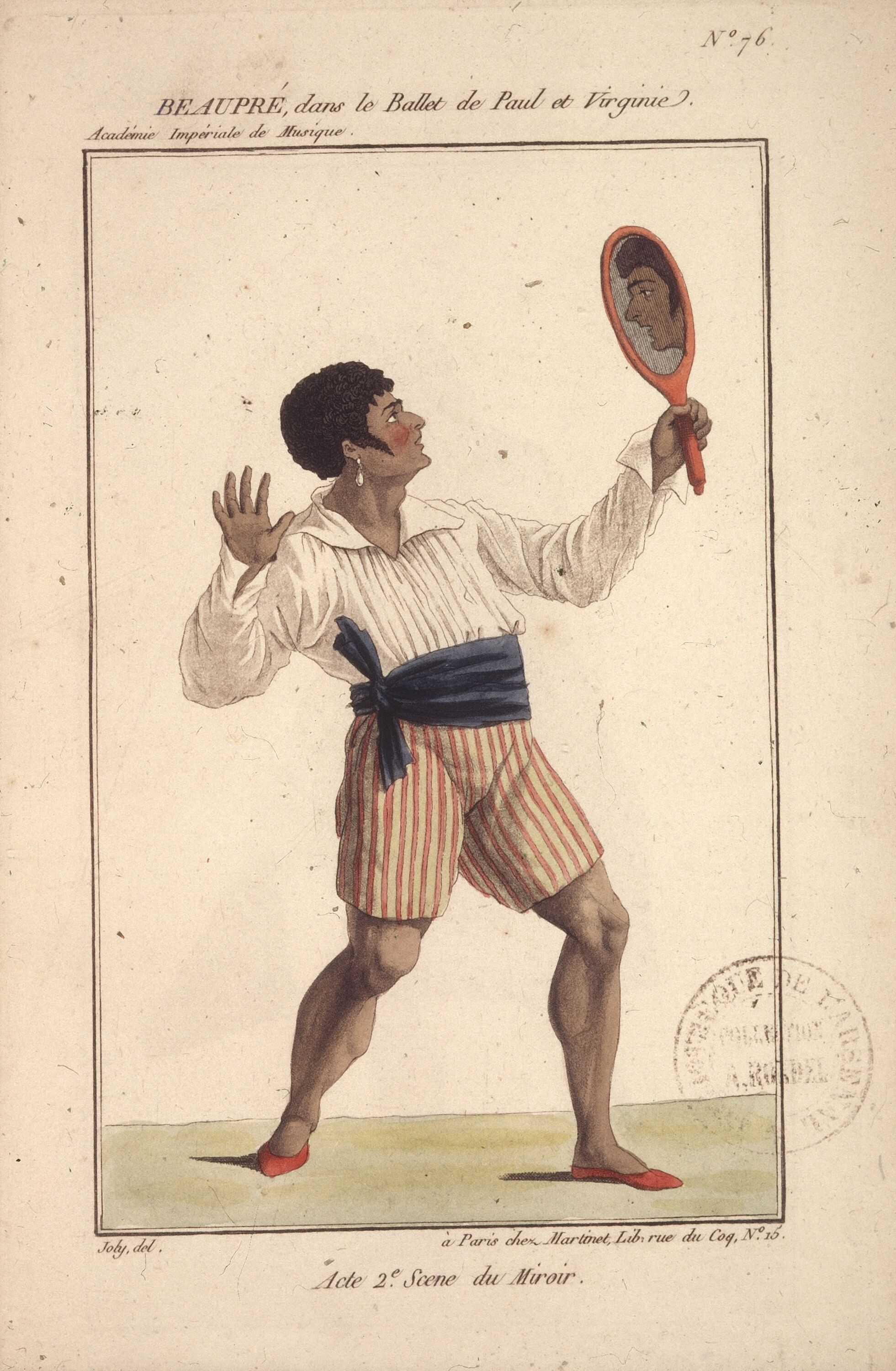
Beaupré in Paul et Virginie.

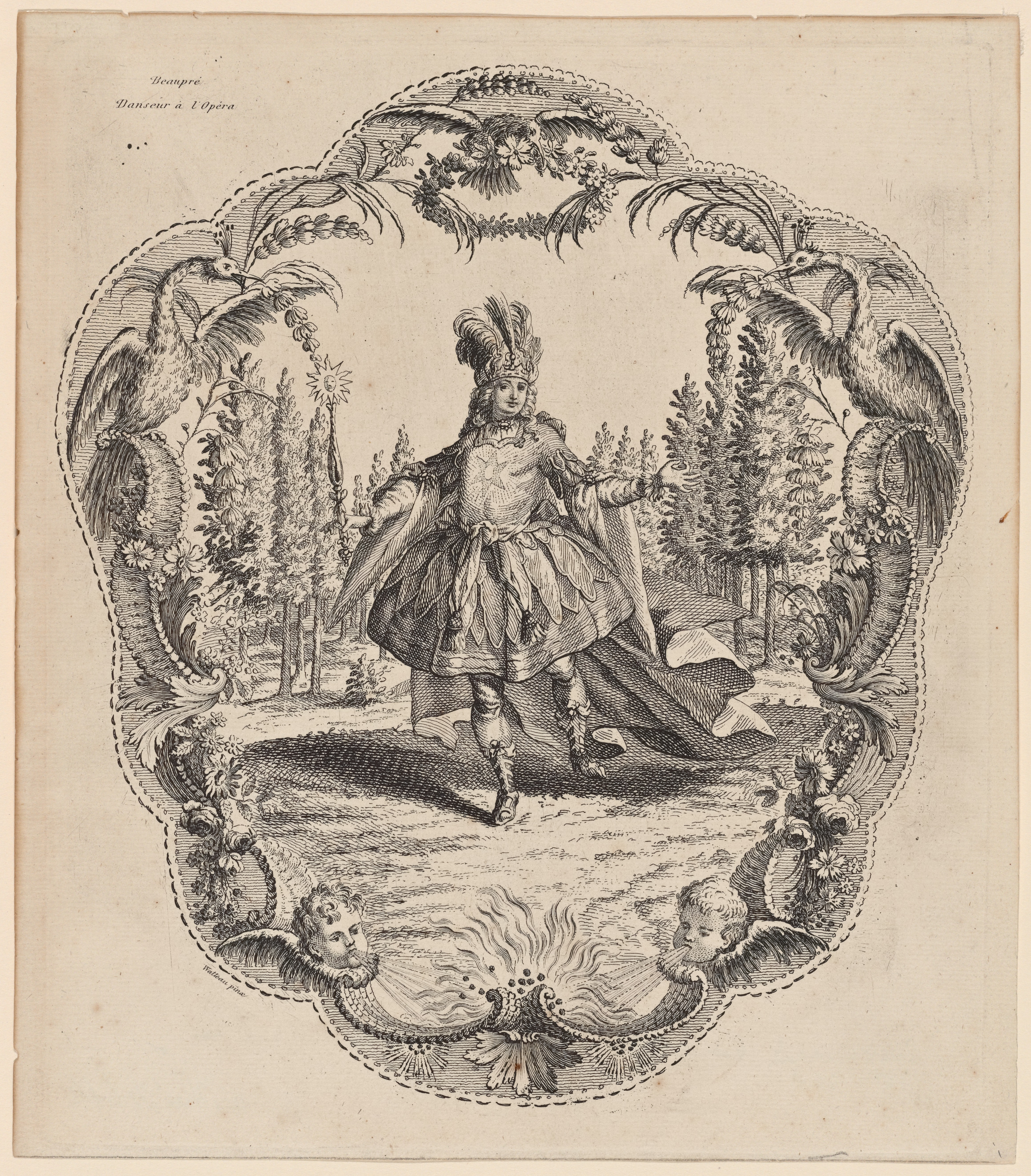
