= Sophie Chevigny =

French ballet dancer (1772–1855)

- Born: Sophie Chevigny; 12 May 1772; Paris, France
- Died: 10 March 1855 (aged 82); Montreuil, Eure-et-Loir, France
- Other names: Geneviève-Sophie Chevigny; Mademoiselle Chevigny
- Occupations: Dancer; Actor

Sophie Chevigny (12 May 1772 – 10 March 1855), known professionally as Mlle Chevigny was a French ballet dancer and mime who performed as a principal dancer at the Opéra de Paris.

== Early life ==
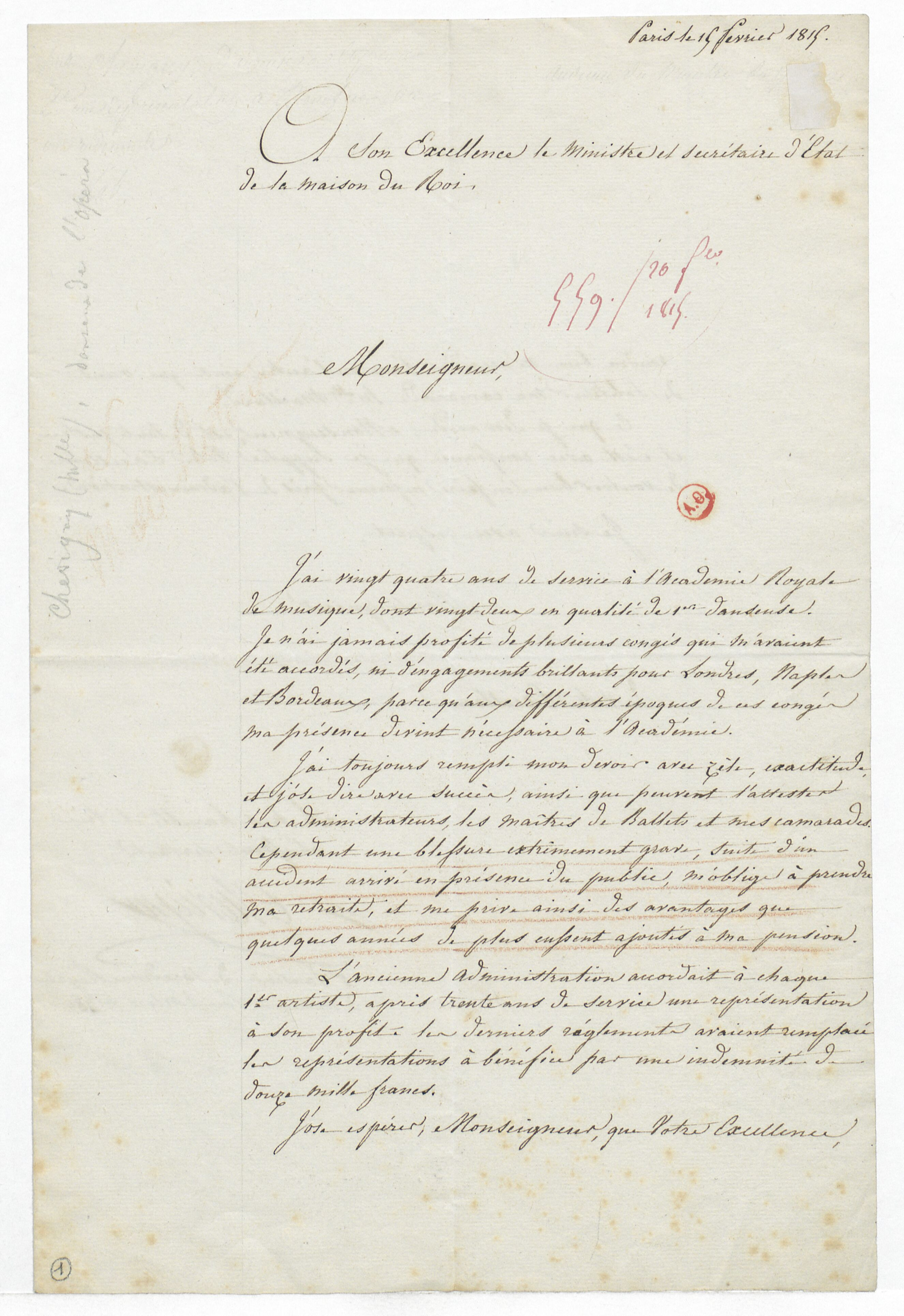
Autographed letter signed by Chevigny to the minister and secretary of state for the Maison du Roi, Paris, 15 February 1815

Geneviève-Sophie Chevigny was born in Paris, France on 12 May 1772.

In the late 1780s, she had a son with French architect Jacques Cellerier who designed the Théâtre de l'Ambigu-Comique.

== Career ==
Studying in Paris with the dancer Jean-Antoine Favre, Chevigny achieved early recognition at the Théâtre de l'Ambigu-Comique before being called to the Académie Royale de Musique (now Paris Opera) for her debut on 23 February 1790. Going by the stage name Mlle Chevigny, she was within two years promoted to one of the principal dancers of the Royal Academy, a position she shared for a long period with Madame Gardel, and later with the dancer Clotilde Mafleuroy. She performed for the first time as a mime in Maximilien Gardel's Premier Navigateur in 1791. Chevigny was selected by Louis Milon, the Academy's assistant ballet-master, for a role in the ballet Les Noces de Gamache in 1801.

An illness interrupted her career, and after a short-lived retirement in 1804, public reaction brought her back in 1806. Chevigny's portrayal of Eurycleia, Ulysses' nurse, in Le Retour d'Ulysse by Louis Milon, which premiered on 27 February 1807, was a great success. In 1810, Chevigny was cast in Persée et Andromède by Pierre Gardel as Cassiopeia. The role of Octavia in Antoine et Cléopâtre brought Chevigny great success. The ballet, featuring music by Rodolphe Kreutzer, had its first performance on 8 March 1808. She performed in Gardel's 1812 ballet L'enfant prodigue as the Prodigal Son's mother.

Throughout her twenty-five-year career at the opera, she successfully created numerous roles in pantomime ballets performed at the theater, including Le jugement de Paris, Oenone, Figaro, Suzanne, Telemachus, Eucharis, Hero and Leandre, Venus, The Marriage of Gamache, Quitterie, Lucas and Laurette, Nicole, The Loves of Antoinette and Cleo, Shepherd, and Octavie, each earning her widespread acclaim. Chevigny chose to retire permanently from the theatre in 1815. On 15 February 1815, she sent a letter to the Minister for the Maison du Roi, applying for a retirement pension. She had settled into retirement in Paris, and was listed on the pension roll of the Opéra de Paris.

== Death ==
Sophie Chevigny died in Montreuil, Eure-et-Loir, France on 10 March 1855.
