= Psyché (ballet) =

1790 ballet-pantomime by Pierre Gardel

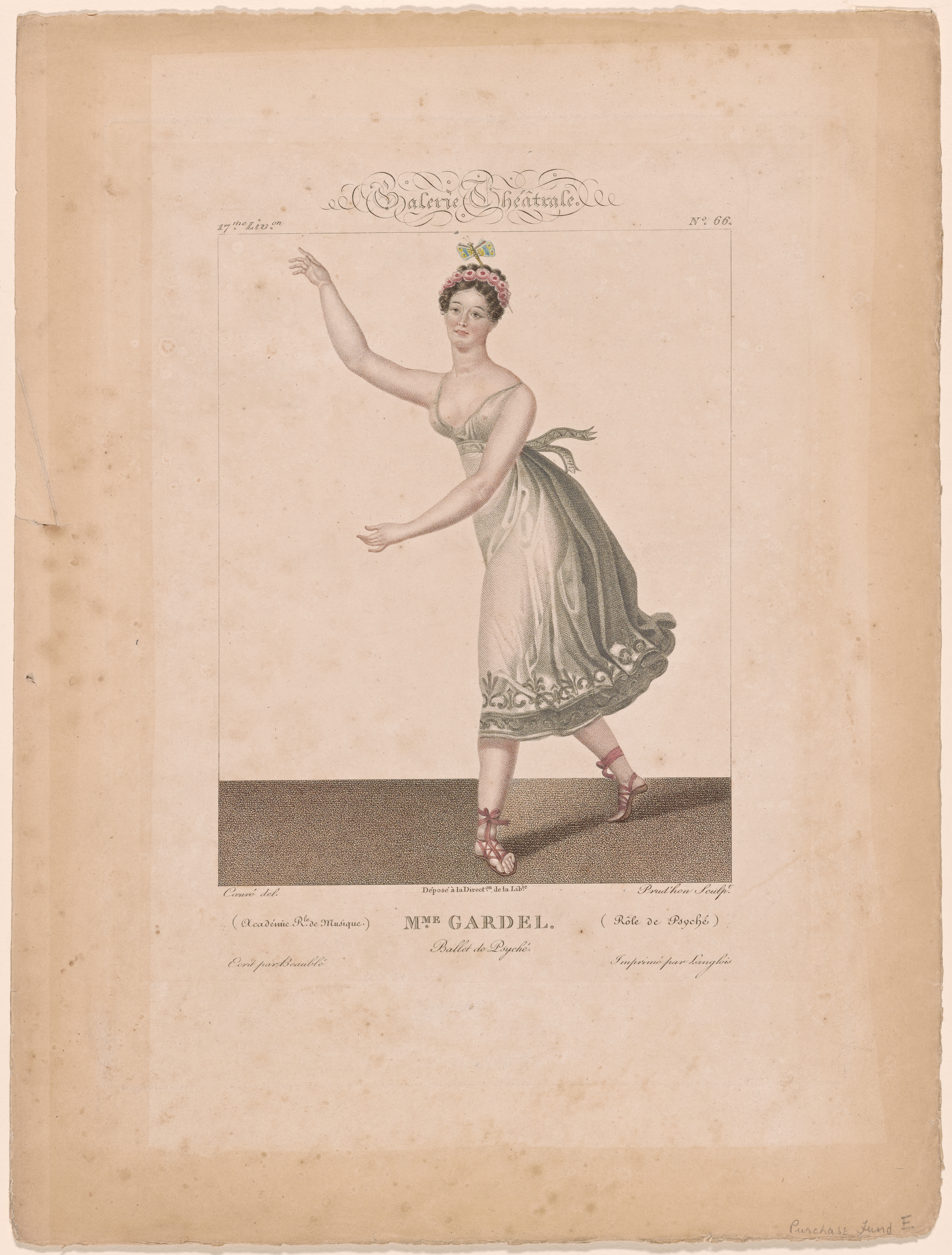
- Mme Gardel in the role of "Psyché"
- Native title: Psyché
- Choreographer: Pierre Gardel
- Music: Ernest Müller (Miller)
- Premiere: 14 December 1790; Paris, France
- Genre: Pantomime
- Type: Ballet

Psyché (originally titled Psiché) is a French ballet-pantomime created in 1790 by Pierre Gardel and performed at the Théâtre de l'Académie Royale de Musique (known as Paris Opéra).

== Background ==
The ballet d'action, originally titled Psiché in its first printing in 1790, was reprinted as Psyché in 1804, a title that has since been widely used. It was presented in three acts with choreography composed by Pierre Gardel, the maître de ballet (ballet master) of the Académie Royale de Musique, and music by Miller. On 14 December 1790, Psiché was premiered at the Théâtre National in Paris, France.

The ballet stayed in the Opéra's repertoire from 1790 to 10 April 1829, totaling 1,161 performances, with a one-year pause in 1828. It was revived on 23 February 1829, to honor Gardel. During Gardel's benefit performance, Italian dancer Marie Taglioni honored Gardel by dancing the title role in his ballet.

== Music ==
The music was arranged by Polish flautist Ernest Müller (Kravinsky), known as "Miller", preceded by the overture to Démophon by Johann Christoph Vogel. Gardel, a competent musician, personally selected melodies to be incorporated into the score, while the original sections of Psyche's music were written by Ernest Miller.

== Roles ==
The main roles throughout the 1790s included Psyche, Mlle Miller; Venus, Clotilde; Flora, Miss Pérignon; Apollo, Pierre Gardel; and Love, Auguste Vestris.

The main dancers for the premiere of Psiché were the following artists:

Role	Première cast, 14 December 1790 (Cast member: -)
Psiché	Mlle Miller
Jupiter	M. le Bel
Venus	Mlle Saulnier
L'Amour	Auguste Vestris
L'Hymen	Mlle Chevigny
Zephyr	M. Laborie
Flore	Mlle. Pérignon
Terpsichore	Mlle Rose
Apollo	Pierre Gardel
Mercure	Le même
Héré	Mlle. Laure
Hercule	M. Huard
Tisiphone	M. Goyon
Mégére	M. Frederick
Alecton	M. le Boeuf
Les Parques	Mlles. Chenneval, Desrozeaux, and Barbier
La Haine	M. Simonet
L'Envie	M. Millon
Le Roi, pere de Psiché	M. Millon
La Reine, mere de Psiché	Mlle. Grenier
Les Deux Soeurs de Psiché	Mlle Coulon, Mlle Chevigny
Leurs Époux	Mrs. Favre, Mrs. Huard

== Setting ==
The first act was set in a broad countryside. A colonnaded temple dedicated to Venus stood on the left foreground, showcasing her statue. To the right, far away, the King's grand palace was visible. The backdrop revealed the sea breaking against the foot of a towering rock. The second act took place in the luxurious interior of a palace built by Love. A dressing table with its accessories was set on one side, while mirrors and paintings celebrating Love's victories decorated the hall. Multiple doors lined the back, and the scene unfolded at night. The third act showcased a horrifying vision of hell. The Phlegethon surged with flames in the background, a volcano extending toward the river. The scene included mountain caves on either side and the visible lair of Cerberus.

== Criticism ==
From the end of the 18th century into the 19th, the three-act ballet was regarded as one of the most celebrated choreographic pieces.

In describing Marie Miller's performance as "Psyche", French writer Arsène Houssaye wrote, "She danced so well as Psyche that one would have taken her for Love." Mlle Miller was the stepdaughter of Ernest Miller. A performance of the pantomimic ballet in 1804 pleased the French writer Stendhal.

== Theme ==
The inspiration for the theme is taken from the 1669 fable Les amours de Psyché et de Cupidon by Jean de La Fontaine. Pierre Gardel, seizing on this theme, took over the subject a few years after Dauberval's ballet titled Psyché was staged at the Bordeaux theatre on 16 February 1788.

On the subject of other ballet adaptations of the myth, Gardel remarked: "For a long time my friends advised me to try my weak talents on the subject of Psychia, a subject immortalized by the divine La Fontaine. At first my refusals were constant; because I knew that M. Noverre and Auberval had both given proofs of their genius on this same subject, and I feared the comparisons which could only turn to my disadvantage; however I read the Programs of these two masters and I realized that they had no resemblance, and that consequently they could not be compared. This made a ray of hope shine in me: I immediately took up Apulée, La Fontaine, Moliere, and the charming poem of M. Abbé Aubert, and I saw that it was as possible for me to avoid being compared to M. Noverre and Auberval as it had been easy for the latter to be compared to Mr. Noverre. At the same time I set to work and I still do not know if, with the help of the ideas that the great poets I have just named gave me and inspired me, I have achieved the goal that I had set for myself. I did not doubt that some people would spread (as they have already done) that this ballet is not mine: but I remembered that last year they had put my Télémaque down to several artists who had never thought of it, and that did not stop me, perhaps it is a misfortune; perhaps also I was too rash to dare to measure myself against two such formidable adversaries; but the career of the arts as well as that of arms is not traveled without this rashness, which often ensures success. Moreover, if one wishes to compare the three programs, one will be grateful to me at least for having sought to overcome the difficulties that the fear of resemblance presented to me in each scene of my work."
