= L'enfant prodigue (ballet) =

1812 ballet-pantomime

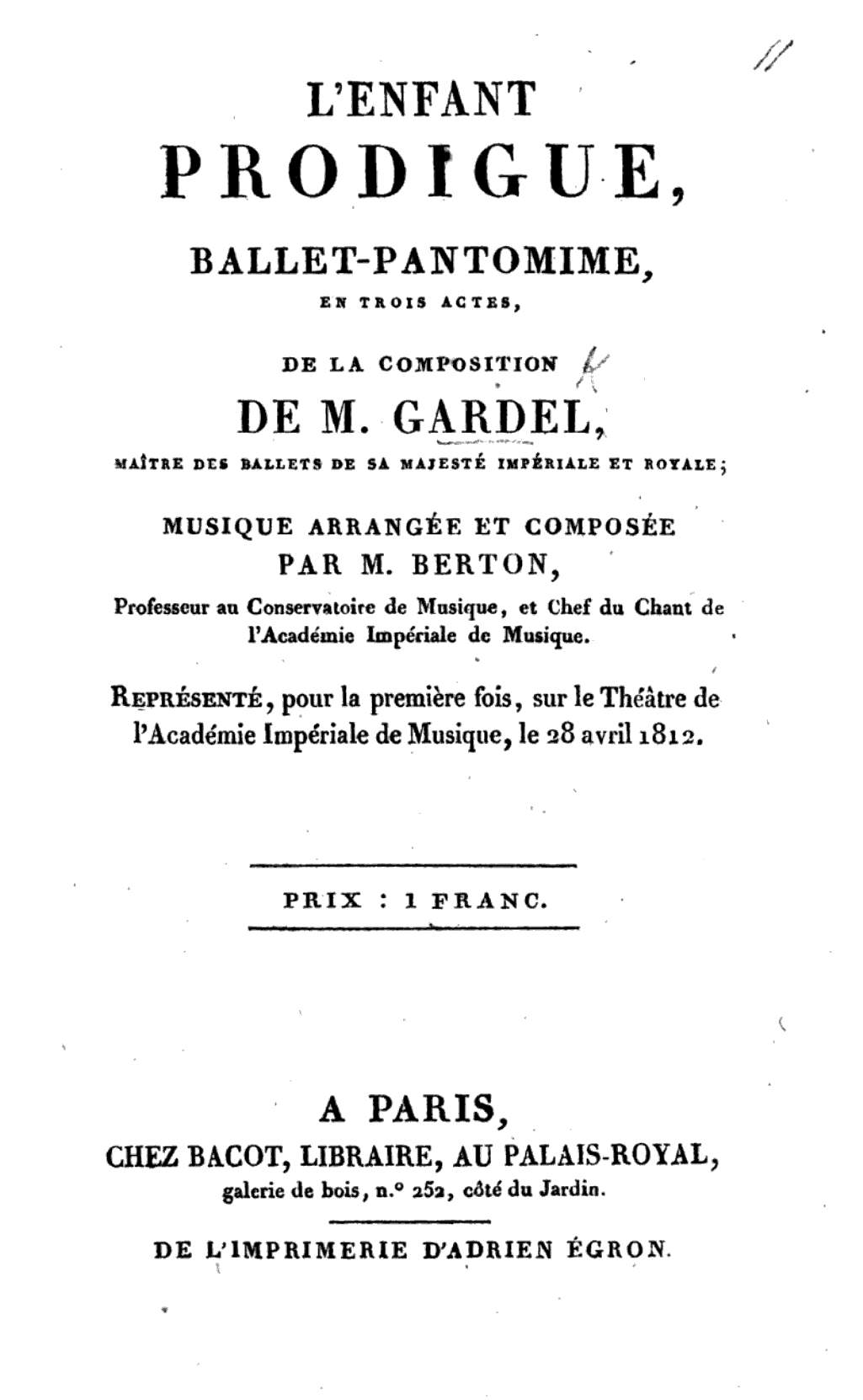
- Native title: L'enfant prodigue
- Choreographer: Pierre Gardel
- Music: Henri-Montan Berton
- Based on: Parable of the Prodigal Son
- Premiere: 28 April 1812; Opéra de Paris, Paris, France
- Setting: Temple of Apis
- Genre: Pantomime
- Type: Ballet

L'enfant prodigue is a French ballet-pantomime created in 1812 by Pierre Gardel and first performed at the Opéra de Paris.

== Background ==
Based on the biblical Parable of the Prodigal Son, the ballet L'enfant prodigue was presented in three acts with choreography by French ballet-master Pierre Gardel. On 28 April 1812, L'enfant prodigue was premiered at the Opéra de Paris in Paris, France. The set design was influenced by the desert and the temple of the deity Apis in Memphis, Egypt.

L'enfant prodigue was reworked after its premiere for its performance on 2 May 1812. Criticized elements were removed, enhancing the ballet's acclaim and aligning it with the grandeur expected at the Opera.

The Gardel-directed ballet was preceded by his 1810 ballet-pantomime titled Persée et Andromède.

== Music ==
The ballet's score, arranged by Henri-Montan Berton, included pieces from Mozart, Haydn, Sacchini, Paësiello, Paer, Viotti, alongside Berton's own compositions. The first act drew from the prayer of French composer Étienne Méhul's Joseph, Austrian composer Joseph Haydn's Reine de France romance, works by Italian violinist Giovanni Battista Viotti, and a symphony by Haydn in C.

== Roles ==
Auguste Vestris, Beaupré, Émilie Bigottini, and Gosselin were key performers in the premiere held on 28 April 1812. The May performance starred Vestris as the Prodigal Son, showcasing his mime talent, with Mlle Chevigny as the son's mother and Madame Gardel as Jephtelle.

The main roles were entrusted to the following principal dancers of the Opera de Paris:

Role	Première cast, 28 April 1812 (Cast member: - )
Prodigal Son	Auguste Vestris
Prodigal Son's mother	Mlle Chevigny
Jephtelle	Madame Gardel
Lia	Émilie Bigottini

== Synopsis ==
French emperor Napoleon selected the subject of the ballet from several librettos choreographer Pierre Gardel presented to him. Gardel had hoped to stage a work on William Tell with themes of liberty and resistance, but the emperor favored The Prodigal Son.

The ballet of the Prodigal Son, taken from the New Testament, unfolded across three main acts: Act I depicted the Prodigal Son's departure from home, act II followed his wanderings in a foreign land, and act III portrayed his return home.

In the first act, young Azaël, the Prodigal Son, declares his intent to leave home, lured by the allure of Memphis, the capital of Egypt. Despite his grief, his father provides him with money, while his mother expresses deep sorrow. Act two shifts to Memphis, where Azaël who arrives alone succumbs to indulgence, losing his wealth and betraying Lia, a virtuous Moabite girl who had fallen in love with him. Overcome by despair and rejected by her father, Lia sacrifices herself to the Nile. The third act finds Azaël destitute in the desert starving and robbed by crooks, where an angel inspires him to return home. Upon returning home to the land of "Jessen", the first person he meets is Jephtelle.
