= Fanny Bias =

French ballet dancer (1789–1825)

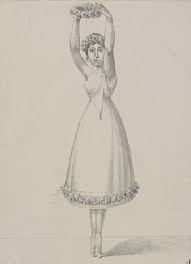
- Fanny Bias as Flore in Flore et Zéphire by Charles Didelot
- Born: Anne-Françoise Bias; 3 June 1789; Paris, France
- Died: 6 September 1825 (aged 36); Paris
- Education: Paris Opera Ballet School
- Occupation: Classical dancer
- Years active: 1807—1825

Anne-Françoise Bias, known as Fanny Bias (3 June 1789 – 6 September 1825), was a dancer at the Paris Opera from 1807 to 1825. She was one of the first dancers to use the pointe technique.

== Biography ==
Bias was born in Paris, France, and trained at the Paris Opera Ballet School under Louis Milon. She made her debut at the opera in 1807 and became one of the most famous dancers of the French Restoration period, together with her friend Émilie Bigottini. Later in her career, she became a first soloist for the company.

In 1820, she was a principal in Les Pages du duc de Vendôme by Jean-Pierre Aumer and Adalbert Gyrowetz. She performed in many other productions, including in London.

She retired due to poor health and died in Paris at the age of 36.
