= Tatiana Stepanova =

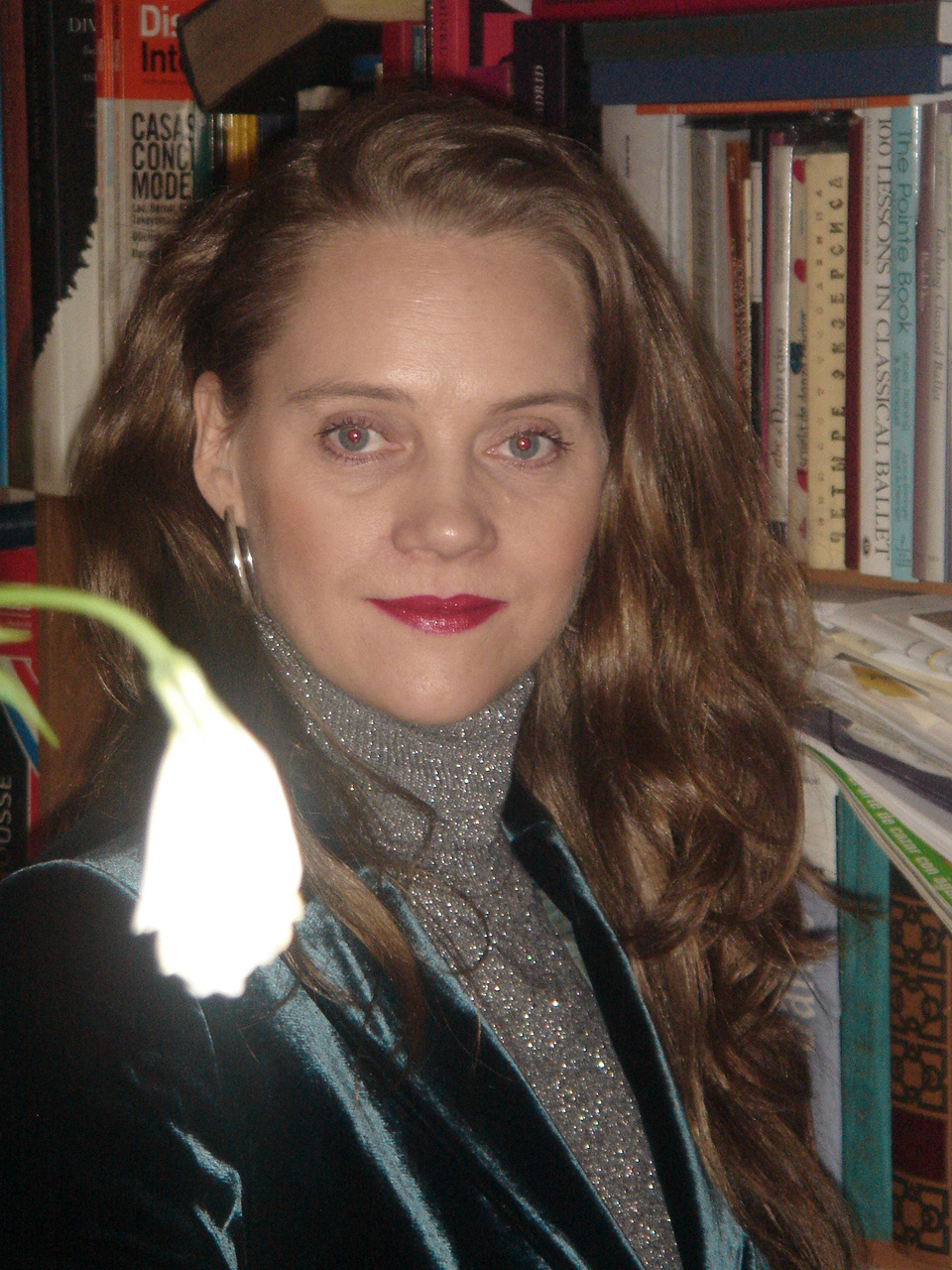
- Stepanova in 2008
- Born: Tatiana Victorovna Stepanova; November 15, 1962 (age 63); Odesa, Ukraine, then Soviet Union
- Occupations: ballet teacher, choreographer, critic, essayist and dancer.
- Years active: 1977-present
- Career
- Dances: Classical ballet, Vaganova

Tatiana Viktorovna Stepanova, also Tetiana Stepanova, (Russian: Татьяна Викторовна Степанова; Ukrainian: Тeтяна Вікторівна Степанова, Tetiana Viktorivna Stepanova) (born 1962, Odesa, Ukraine then Soviet Union) is a Ballet master, choreographer, ballet dancer, critic, essayist and historian of the dance.

== Biography ==
Tatiana Stepanova began her ballet training in the Special School of Ballet of Odesa (Ukraine) as a student of Klaudia Vasina, who was a disciple of the great Russian dancer and teacher Agrippina Vaganova. She completed her dance training at the State School of Ballet and Choreography of Minsk² (Belarus) where she was a pupil of Vera Shvetsova (distinguished disciple of Agrippina Vaganova), who danced in the Maly Theatre of Saint Petersburg (Russia) and in the Great Theater of Opera and Ballet of Riga (Latvia).

Stepanova graduated in Choreographic Art from the Saint Petersburg Conservatory³, Russia (The N.A. Rimsky-Korsakov Saint Petersburg State Conservatory), where she studied with Gabriella Komleva, Nikita Dolgushin and Nicolai Boyarchikov, great dancers of the Mariinsky Theatre (before Kirov Ballet) and of the Mikhaylovsky Theatre (before Maly Theatre) both in Saint Petersburg.

She danced as the soloist in the Odesa Opera and Ballet Theater¹ (Ukraine) and in the Great Theater of Ballet of Minsk² (Belarus).

Since 1985, is a Teacher of Ballet, giving classes in Odesa (Ukraine), Saratov and Saint Petersburg (Russia), Madrid, Valencia, Puertollano and Lugo (Spain) and Ashiya and Nishinomiya (Japan)

Founder and artistic director of the Institute of Investigation and Studies of Dance (Instituto de Investigación y Estudios de Danza) in Madrid (Spain).

Stepanova has published numerous articles of criticism in newspapers and weeklies in Ukraine (Vechirnia Odesa), Russia (Glásnost, Perestroika and Dance), Spain (El Cultural of La Razón) and United States.

As a teacher intent on purity and on the maintenance of choreographic heritage of classical ballet, Stepanova created a short version of The Sleeping Beauty (1h 20'), which best maintains the heritage of Marius Petipa in the steps that are conserved as well as in those that are added in his style. This version premiered December seven, 2008, in the Hyogo Performing Arts Center^{4} (Nishinomiya, Japan), under the title of Sleeping Beauty Suite.

Currently, Tatyana Stepanova directs the Institute of Investigation and Studies of Dance in Madrid, (Spain) and is the artistic director of the AIS Ballet Japan in Ashiya (Japan).

== Choreographic work ==
=== Miniature ===
- Incrustación carmesí (2002) Crimson Inlay
- Dama rota (2002) Broken Lady
- El Chocolate del loro (2003) The Chocolate of the parrot
- Torre eclipsada (2005) Tower eclipsed
- Jaula de vientos (2005) Cage of winds
- Jaula de loros (2006) Cage of parrots
- Suite azul (2006) Blue Suite
- Remolinos de Naruto (2007) Swirls of Naruto
- Arcadia (2007) Arcady
- Nectar amargo (2007) Nectar bitter
- The death of the nine swans (2009)

=== Madrid's Choreographic ===
- Arena (Sports Suite) (2004) music of D. Shostakovich.
- Nieblas en Baden-Baden (Fogs in Baden-Baden) (2005) Recognized as one of the few Criminal Ballet that exist, where a detective investigation is danced, starred in by José Antonio Checa.
- Mozarito (2006), with music of Mozart and for the purpose of honoring to the same one in the 250 anniversary of its birth, was starred in by the dancer José Antonio Checa and sponsored by the Department of the Arts of the Community of Madrid. Dance and rolled in the Palace of the Duke of Ugena, historic headquarters of the Chamber of Commerce and Industry of Madrid (Cámara de Comercio e Industria de Madrid).

=== Ashiya's Diptych ===
Stepanova is known for the Ashiya's Diptych, a suite of works of Marius Petipa. She reinterpreted the pieces in such a way that her choreography seamlessly combines with that of Petipa.

- Sleeping Beauty Suite (2008), (1h 20'), Music of Tchaikovsky
- La Bayadède (2010), (1h 33'), Music of Minkus, This version premiered itself January 24, 2010 in the Grand Hall of Hyogo Performing Arts Center, (Nishinomiya, Japan)

== See also ==
- List of Russian ballet dancers
