= Claude Gardel =

German ballet master

- Born: Claude Gardel
- Died: 1774; Paris, France
- Occupations: Dancer; Ballet master
- Children: Maximilien Gardel; Pierre Gardel

Claude Gardel was an 18th-century German ballet master who served at the courts of Württemberg, Mannheim, and Nancy.

== Early life ==
Claude Gardel was born in the 18th century.

== Career ==
At his son's birth, Claude was employed in the lyric troupe of the Elector Palatine's court in Mannheim, known for its support of the arts. In the 1740s, the city of Mannheim became a thriving center for ballet and opera under the patronage of Charles Theodore. Gardel briefly assisted the Italian ballet master Sébastien Scio during his tenure. At the 1742 wedding of Charles Theodore and the inauguration of the new opera house, Carlo Grua's Meride included entr'acte ballets by Scio and Gardel.

Over the course of his career, he served as ballet master at the courts of Württemberg and Mannheim in Germany, as well as in Nancy in the Duchy of Lorraine.

After working alongside the Mannheim Court Orchestra, Claude Gardel held the position of a paid dance master in the city of Nancy. During this period, Gardel served as the ballet master to King Stanislas of Poland, known formally as Stanisław Leszczyński. Nancy, the capital of the Duchy of Lorraine, had been granted to Poland's King Stanisław Leszczyński by King Louis XV as part of a diplomatic arrangement.

Gardel received a call to Paris and joined the Opéra de Paris in 1760 after leaving the Court of Lorraine. In 1770, he choreographed a minuet for the wedding of Marie Antoinette and Louis XVI.

== Personal life ==
His wife, Jeanne-Louise Cahart Darthenay, gave birth to their first son, Maximilien, in Mannheim on 18 December 1741. His second son, Pierre Gardel, was born during his tenure in Nancy in 1754. His children would later go on to have successful careers as dancers and choreographers at the Opéra de Paris. Maximilien, his son, died in 1787, and Pierre died in 1840, both in Paris, France.

== Death ==
Claude Gardel died in Paris, France in 1774.
