= Marie-Adrienne Chameroy =

French ballet dancer

- Born: 1779; Paris, Kingdom of France
- Died: 25 October 1802 (aged 23); Paris, French First Republic

Marie-Adrienne Chameroy (1779 – 25 October 1802) was a French dancer who performed at the Paris Opera.

== Early life and career ==
She was born in Paris and studied dance with Pierre Gardel. She made her debut in the ballet Psyché in February 1796, performing the role of Terpsichore, the muse of dance. In the opera Anacréon chez Polycrate, she is said to have given a remarkable performance where she represented in dance the musicality of the orchestra's clarinet. She was said to have combined the abilities of dancer Auguste Vestris with an inimitable grace.

== Death ==
She died during childbirth in Paris at the age of 23. Many believed that had she not died young, she would have become one of the leading dancers of the Paris Opera.

The priest at the church of Saint-Roch refused to allow her body to be brought into the church or to perform a funeral service for Chameroy. The priest at the Couvent des Filles-Saint-Thomas agreed to perform the funeral. The priest at Saint-Roch was disciplined by the archbishop of Paris for his actions. The incident inspired a libelle entitled Querelle de saint Roch et de saint Thomas sur l’ouverture du manoir céleste à Mademoiselle Chameroy ("Quarrel between Saint Roch and Saint Thomas about allowing Miss Chameroy to enter heaven").
