= Persée et Andromède (ballet) =

1810 ballet-pantomime

- Native title: Persée et Andromède
- Choreographer: Pierre Gardel
- Music: Étienne-Nicolas Méhul
- Based on: Perseus and Andromeda
- Premiere: 8 June 1810; Théâtre de l'Académie Impériale de Musique, Paris, France
- Original ballet company: Paris Opera Ballet
- Genre: Pantomime
- Type: Ballet

Persée et Andromède (English: Perseus and Andromeda) is a French ballet-pantomime created in 1810 by Pierre Gardel and performed at the Opéra de Paris.

== Background ==
The ballet Persée et Andromède was presented in three acts with choreography by Pierre Gardel (ballet master at the Opéra) and music arranged by Étienne-Nicolas Méhul. It was based on the subject of Perseus and Andromeda. Certain elements of the myth were altered to amplify interest and effectiveness. Gardel dedicated it to the Prince of Schwarzenberg Karl Philipp, an Austrian diplomat, military leader, and ambassador of Francis II, the Emperor of Austria.

On 8 June 1810, Persée et Andromède was premiered at the Théâtre de l'Académie Impériale de Musique (Opéra de Paris) in Paris, France.

== Music ==
Gardel's ballet composition was set to music arranged by Étienne-Nicolas Méhul. Méhul incorporated a rondeau from a sonata by German composer Steibelt.

== Setting ==
The theatre in act one was a flower-adorned public square prepared for games, bordered by Juno's temple and the king's palace, with a bridge in the background. Act two portrayed the king's gardens, featuring statues such as Jupiter's. The set design in act three depicted a palace courtyard of Cepheus, with a sea arm visible in the distance.

== Roles ==
The principal roles were entrusted to artists such as:

Role	Première cast, 8 June 1810 (Cast member: - )
Cassiopeia (Queen and wife of Cepheus)	Mlle Chevigny
Andromeda (only daughter of Cepheus and Cassiope)	Madame Gardel
Cepheus (King of Ethiopia)	Louis Milon
Perseus (son of Jupiter, loved by Andromeda)	Auguste Vestris
Phineus (prince of the family of Cepheus)	Albert
Juno (wife of Jupiter)	Mlle Victoire Saulnier
Mercury	Louis-Stanislas Montjoie
Neptune	M. Galais
Jupiter	M. Galais
Hymen	M. Charles Vestris
L'Amour	Mlle Hullin
Apollo	M. Albert
Diana	Mlle Saulnier
Venus	Mlle Athalie
Pallas	Mlle Gaillet
Zephyr	M. Beaulieu
Hebe	Mlle Milliére
Flora	M. Delisle
Mars	M. Mérante
The Great Priest of Juno (Le grand-Prêtre de Juno)	M. Godefroy
An Ethiopian (Un Éthiopien)	M. Goyon
