= Beaupre =

Beaupre or Beaupré may refer to:

- Beaupre (surname), surname found mostly in Canada, the United States and parts of England
- Beaupré, Quebec, a ville in the Canadian province of Quebec
- Sainte-Anne-de-Beaupré, Quebec, a town near Quebec city, Canada
  - Basilica of Sainte-Anne-de-Beaupré, a Roman Catholic sanctuary
- Old Beaupre Castle, a ruined manor house near Cowbridge, Wales
- Beaupré Cove, a cove in Graham Land, Antarctica
- Beaupré Hall, a former home of the Beaupres in Outwell, Norfolk, England, demolished in 1966
- The Beaupre parachute system used by the United States Air Force in Project Excelsior, 1959–1960
- Beaupré (dancer), French ballet dancer
