= Dardanus (Sacchini) =

1784 opera by Antonio Sacchini

- Tragédie lyrique by Antonio Sacchini
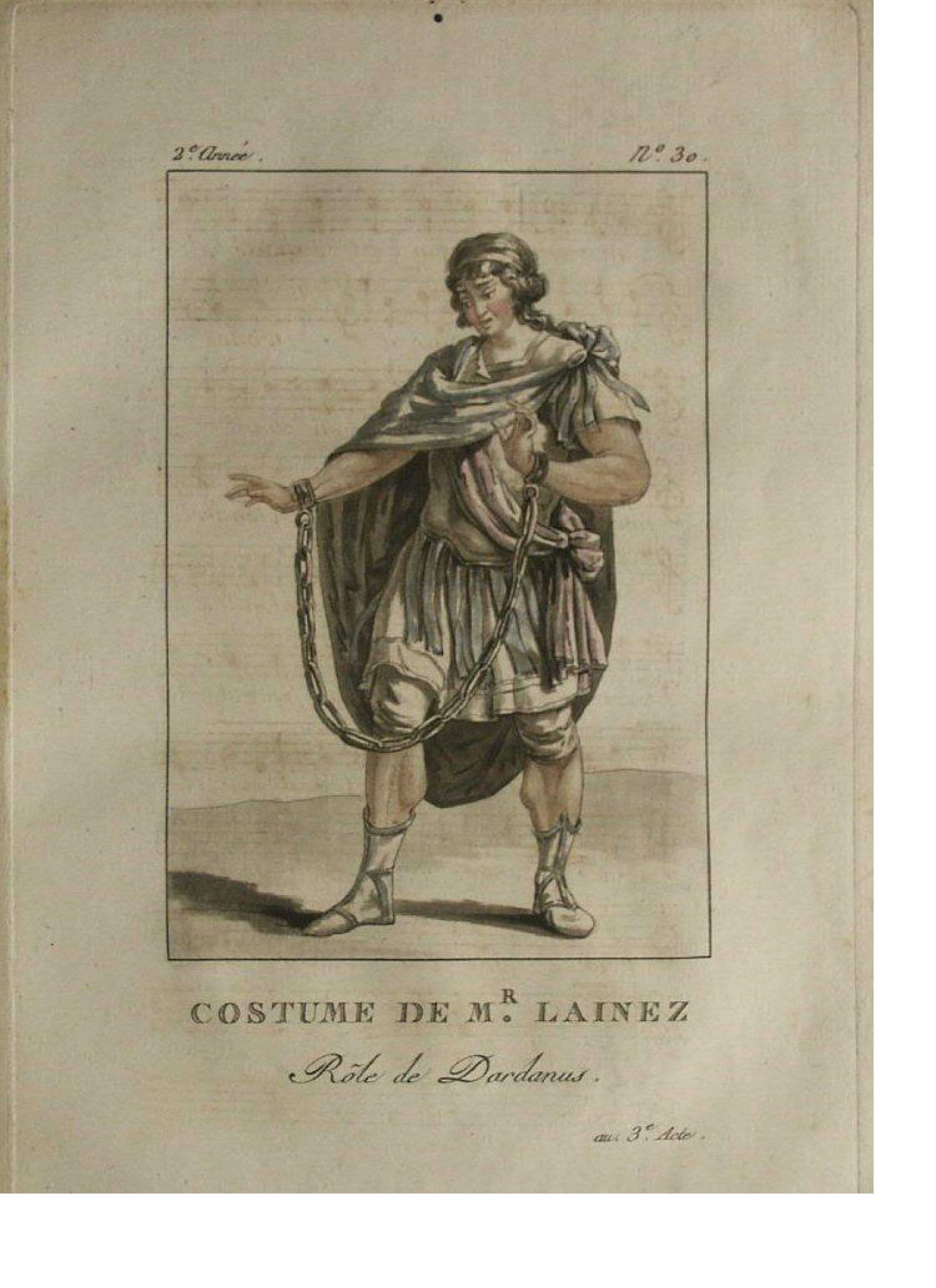
- Étienne Lainez, leading tenor of the Royal music, in the costume of Dardanus
- Librettist: Nicolas-François Guillard
- Language: French
- Based on: Charles-Antoine Leclerc de La Bruère's libretto for Daardanus
- Premiere: 18 September 1784; Palace of Versailles

Dardanus is an opera by Antonio Sacchini. It takes the form of a tragédie lyrique in four acts (later revised to a three-act version). It was first performed at Versailles on 18 September 1784, and subsequently at the Paris Opera on 30 November of the same year. The French-language libretto was adapted by Nicolas-François Guillard from that by Charles-Antoine Leclerc de La Bruère, which had already been set to music by Jean-Philippe Rameau in his earlier opera of the same name.

== History ==
Guillard's adaptation blends both 1739 and 1744 versions of Rameau's opera, but is based principally upon the second one. Although "the title-page of the printed score reads only 'paroles de M. Guillard', [in fact] most of the text is by La Bruère". Guillard's interventions mainly consisted in "[omitting] the Prologue, [altering] the order of events in Act 3, and skilfully [compressing] Acts 4 and 5". The librettist "justified his redoing the subject ... [by explaining] that his aim was to tighten the plot and create better motivation for the characters". The dancing divertissement was done by Pierre Gardel. The opera was not successful at its first appearance and had no more than six performances. Both Maillard, who played Iphise, and Larrivée, who played Teucer, were regarded as inadequate, the latter having to be replaced by Moreau after the second performance; the opera as a whole was deeply involved in the growing hostility towards Queen Marie Antoinette's predilection for foreigners, Sacchini being her favourite: she herself had introduced the musician to the king in 1783, when he had been celebrated at court along with another Italian composer Piccinni, when they had both been granted substantial pensions on account of their recently staged operas, Didon and Chimène.

Sacchini and Guillard later decided to revise Dardanus, reducing it to three acts and introducing new choreography by Gaetano Vestris. The new version was given at Fontainebleau on 20 October 1785 and was later brought to the stage of the Paris Opera on 17 January 1786, enjoying a total of 25 performances in 1786/1787. "It was [later] mounted annually between 1800 and 1808, and it was sung on 28 dates in these nine years", before being definitively dropped.

== Roles ==
Roles, voice types, premiere cast
Role	Voice type	Premiere cast, 18 September 1784 before Louis XVI and Marie Antoinette
Iphise	soprano	Marie Thérèse Maillard
Dardanus	tenor	Étienne Lainez
Arcas	haute-contre	Dufrenaye (also spelled Dufresnay) (Note: Dufresnay, "a young seminarian from Évreux", had been engaged in 1782 to sing the haute-contre as a double)
Anténor	taille/baritone	François Lays
Teucer	bass-baritone	Henri Larrivée (Note: From the third performance, Jean-Pierre Moreau)
Isménor	bass-baritone	Auguste-Athanase (Augustin) Chéron
Un officier du palais	bass-baritone	M. Moreau
Deux coryphées	sopranos	Adélaïde Gavaudan, cadette/Suzanne Joinville
Deux confidentes	sopranos	Gertrude Girardin/Aurore Domergue (chorus-singers)
Warriors, magicians, sylphs, spirits: choir
Ballet ballerinas: Marie-Madeleine Guimard, Victoire Saulnier; male dancers: Pierre Gardel, Auguste Vestris

== Recordings ==
Music from Dardanus was used in the film Jefferson in Paris. Extracts from the opera appeared on the soundtrack CD, conducted by William Christie with Jean-Paul Fouchécourt singing the title role.

Two arias for Iphise ("Il me fuit ... Rien peut émouvoir" and "Cesse, cruel Amour, de régner sur mon âme") were recorded by Véronique Gens on the album Tragédiennes 2, accompanied by the orchestra Les Talens Lyriques conducted by Christophe Rousset (Virgin Classics, 2009).

== Notes and references ==
=== Sources ===
- (in French) Original libretto: Dardanus, tragédie en trois actes; représentée devant leurs majestés, à Trianon, le 18 septembre 1784, Paris, Ballard, 1784 (accessible for free online in Gallica, Bibliothèque Nationale de France)
- Julian Rushton, "Dardanus (ii)", in Stanley Sadie (ed.), The New Grove Dictionary of Opera, Grove (Oxford University Press), New York, 1997, I, p. 1079, ISBN 978-0-19-522186-2
- (in French) Théodore Lajarte, Bibliothèque Musicale du Théatre de l'Opéra. Catalogue Historique, Chronologique, Anecdotique, Paris, Librairie des bibliophiles, 1878, Tome I, ad nomen, pp. 345–346 (accessible online at Internet Archive)
- Spire Pitou, The Paris Opéra. An Encyclopedia of Operas, Ballets, Composers, and Performers – Rococo and Romantic, 1715–1815 (article: "Dardanus", pp. 142–143), Greenwood Press, Westport/London, 1985 (ISBN 0-313-24394-8)
