= Clotilde Mafleuroy =

French ballet dancer (1776–1826)

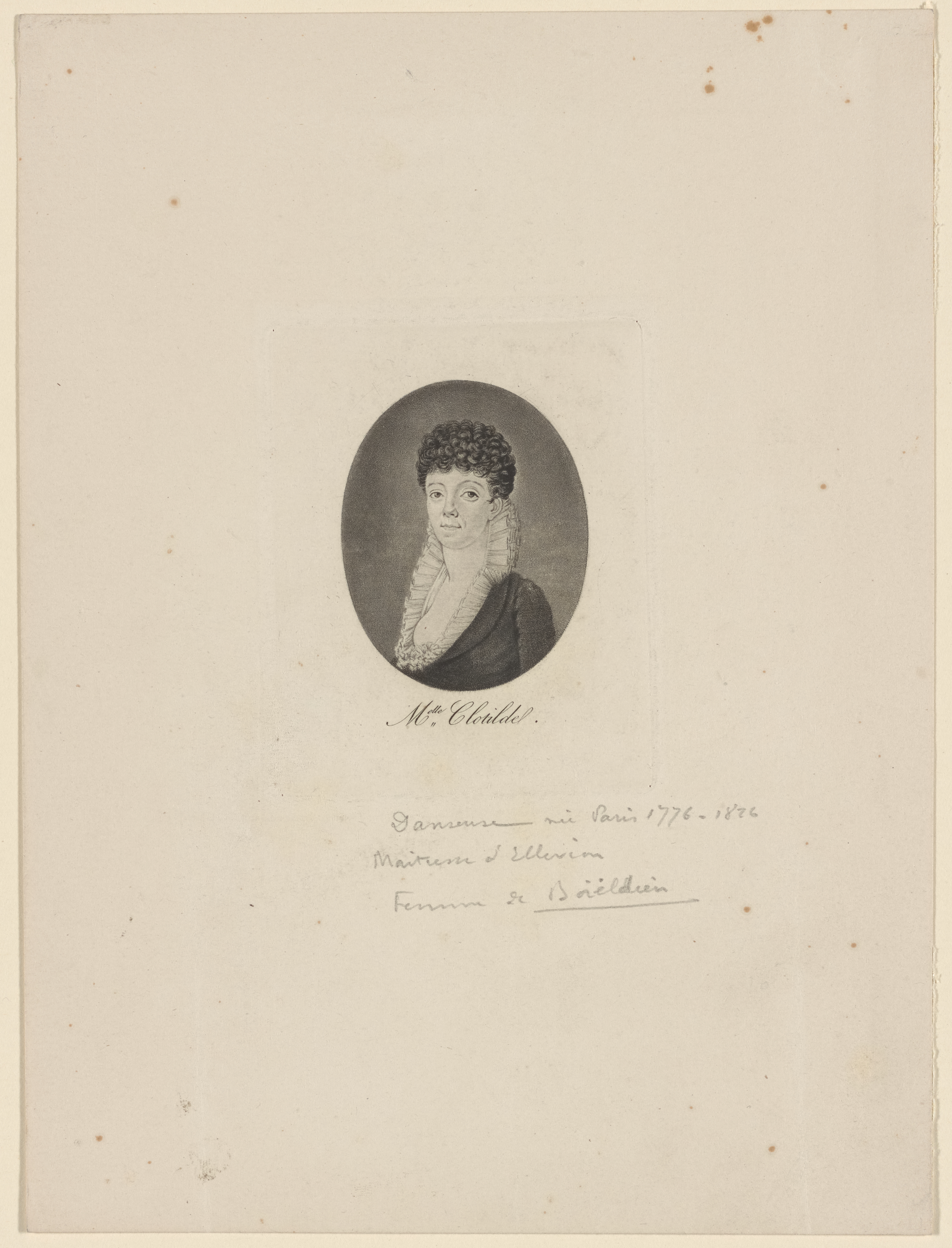
- Born: Clotilde-Auguste Mafleuroy; 1 March 1776; Paris, France
- Died: 15 December 1826 (aged 50); Paris, France
- Other name: Mademoiselle Clotilde
- Occupation: Dancer

Clotilde Mafleuroy (1 March 1776 – 15 December 1826), known professionally as Clotilde, was an 18th-century French ballet dancer who performed as a principal dancer at the Opéra de Paris.

== Early life ==
Clotilde Auguste (or Augustine) Mafleuroy was born on 1 March 1776 in Paris, France.

== Entertainment life ==
Studying in Paris, she was a pupil of Auguste Vestris and performed in the early ballets of Pierre Gardel.

Clotilde's debut at the Académie royale de musique (known as the Paris Opéra) took place in the 1790s.

Playing "Calypso" in Télémaque dans l'île de Calypso, she was joined by Marie Miller as "Eucharis" and Armand Vestris as "Télémaque." In 1793, she was cast in Pierre Gardel's Le Jugement de Pâris. She starred in the pantomime ballet as "Venus" on 5 March 1793 at the Théâtre de l'Académie Impériale de Musique. Known by her first name on stage, she advanced to the position of première danseuse at the Opéra in 1800, a role she held alongside Mlle Chevigny. Premiering on 14 June 1800, La Dansomanie by Gardel starred her as "Mme. Duléger" and Goyon as "M. Duléger".

French author and dramatist Alphonse Royer described Clotilde with the following statement: "Her tall and elegant figure offered the image of the ancient Diana. Her execution is perfect says Noverre, her vigor is not common in women of her height. She paces the theater with ease. She has grace in her arms and developments proportionate to the majesty of her structure".

Clotilde performed in the role of "Galatea" in Pygmalion on 27 October 1801.

One of Clotilde's performances in Télémaque dans l'île de Calypso was recounted in the 1802 journals of Mary Berry who commented: "Mdlle Clotilde was Calypso and at first I did not much admire her figure which is remarkably tall but when she came in dressed for hunting she was the exact copy of the statue called the Diana Cacciatrice the drapery of which is open just above the knee and in my life I never saw such perfect legs, nor legs so perfectly resembling those of the Apollo into the attitudes of which they fell a thousand times".

Among her admirers was Prince Piñatelli, Count of Egmont, who pledged 100,000 francs per month, a proposal she embraced. Admiral Jose de Mazarredo negotiated a supplementary 400,000 francs, rounding out her yearly income.

The Parisian dancer married François-Adrien Boieldieu, a French composer and piano professor at the Conservatoire de Paris, on 19 March 1802. The moment Clotilde wed, she faced the scandal of continuing her past lifestyle. Mafleuroy and Boieldieu, facing personal challenges stemming from their turbulent marriage, prompted Boieldieu to leave Paris in 1803. Clotilde's husband left for St. Petersburg, Russia to accept Czar Alexander's offer of composing three operas per year. Upon his return to France in 1811, Boieldieu wished to divorce Clotilde, but the emperor opposed his request. After Clotilde's death, he went on to remarry.

Clotilde was cast in Le retour d'Ulysse, alongside Mlle Chevigny, Auguste Vestris, and Mme Gardel, premiering on 27 February 1807. That year on the 15th of December, she danced in Spontini's La Vestale by Victor-Joseph Étienne de Jouy.

Throughout 1811, the Journal de Paris documented more than 25 Opéra performances starring Clotilde. She performed as "Diane" in the opera ballet, Le triomphe du mois de Mars, ou le Berceau d'Achille, on 27 March 1811. On 15 September 1812, act three of the Jérusalem délivrée première, featured Clotilde.

On 1 February 1814, she appeared in Méhul's L'oriflamme, a ballet by Gardel, performing the role of a noble alongside Albert.

Mafleuroy retired from the stage in 1819. Her farewell performance at the Opéra on 21 April 1819 included the ballets Adolphe et Clara, Télémaque dans l'île de Calypso, and the Jeunesse d'Henry IV.

== Death ==
Clotilde Mafleuroy died in Paris, France on 15 December 1826.
