= L'oriflamme (opera) =

Méhul in 1799 – portrait by Antoine Gros

L'oriflamme (The Oriflamme) is an opera in one act with music by Étienne Méhul, Henri Montan Berton, Rodolphe Kreutzer and Ferdinando Paer. It was first staged at the Académie Impériale de Musique (the Paris Opera) on 1 February 1814. The libretto is by Charles-Guillaume Étienne and Pierre-Marie-François Baour-Lormian.

== Background and performance history ==
The opera is a pièce de circonstance (a work written for a special occasion) intended to arouse French patriotism during the Campaign of France when Allied armies were invading the country, intent on defeating Napoleon. Amaury Duval, the Inspecteur des Beaux-Arts, encouraged such propaganda works, writing to the Interior Minister: "The police have ordered pièces de circonstance to be composed and played in every theatre in Paris. It's a bit of a hackneyed way of arousing enthusiasm; but we must neglect nothing at such a critical conjuncture." The opera compares Napoleon to Charles Martel, who defeated the attempted Muslim invasion of France at the Battle of Poitiers in 732. The aim was to arouse both Bonapartist and royalist sentiments against the threat of the foreign Allies. Méhul contributed the overture (reused from his opera Adrien) and the romance celebrating the dead warrior Raoul ("Issu d'un noble chevalier"); Paer wrote the music for the pastoral Scene 2; Kreutzer supplied the warrior hymn "Suivons une juste fureur"; and Berton composed the final chorus, "Jurons d'être vaillants, d'être fidèles".

According to the Bonapartist Moniteur Universel, the premiere enjoyed a rapturous reception, with takings of 11,000 francs. The opera ran for 11 performances, the last on 15 March.

== Roles ==
Role	Voice type	Premiere Cast
Chief of the old men	baritone	François Lays
A villager	bass	Henri-Étienne Dérivis
Nazir, a young villager in love with Amasie	tenor	Louis Nourrit
A knight carrying the oriflamme of Charles Martel	tenor	Lavigne
Amasie	soprano	Alexandrine-Caroline Branchu
Chorus: Villagers, warriors

== Synopsis ==
Scene: A village on a plain near Poitiers
The villagers prepare to celebrate the wedding of Nazir and Amasie but first they sing a chorus in praise of Raoul, a knight who gave his life fighting the invading Saracens. The wedding ceremony is interrupted by news that the enemy is ravaging the land again. The villagers agree to abandon the wedding until they have defeated the Saracens. A knight arrives bearing the oriflamme and rouses them to action in the name of Charles Martel. The young village girls hand out weapons to the men. They sing patriotic hymns before heading off to battle.

== Sources ==
- Adélaïde de Place Étienne Nicolas Méhul (Bleu Nuit Éditeur, 2005)
- Arthur Pougin Méhul: sa vie, son génie, son caractère (Fischbacher, 1889)
- General introduction to Méhul's operas in the introduction to the edition of Stratonice by M. Elizabeth C. Bartlet (Pendragon Press, 1997)
- David Chaillou, Napoléon et l'Opéra: La Politique sur la Scène (1810-1815) (Fayard, 2004)
