= Marie Miller (dancer) =

French ballet dancer (1770–1833)

Madame Gardel
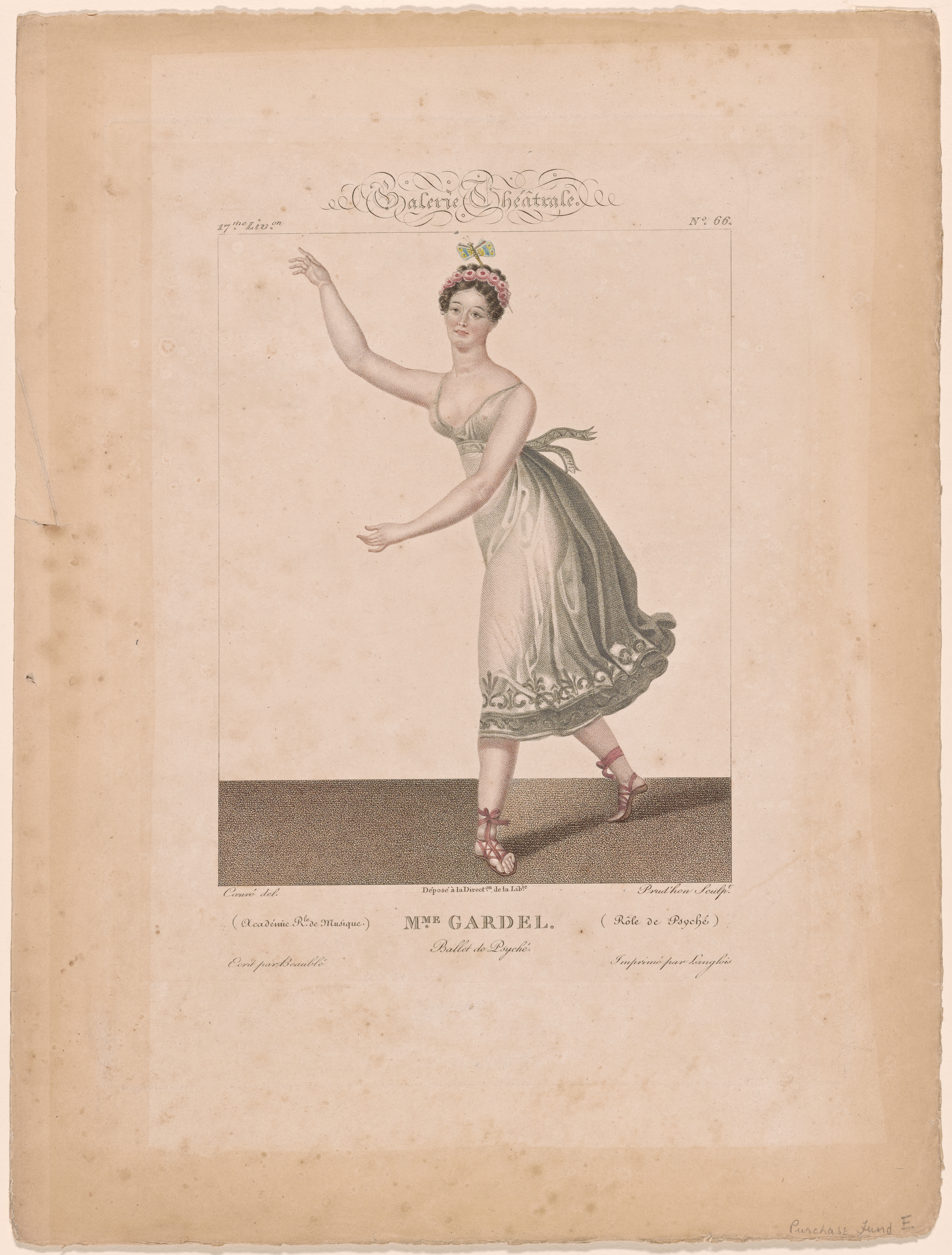
- Born: Marie Miller; 8 April 1770; Auxonne, France
- Died: 18 April 1833 (aged 63); Paris, France
- Other names: Mademoiselle Miller; Madame Gardel
- Occupation: Dancer
- Years active: 1789–1816
- Spouse: Pierre Gardel

Marie Miller (8 April 1770 – 18 April 1833), or Marie-Élisabeth-Anne Houbert, known professionally as Mlle Miller and later Madame Gardel, was an 18th-century French ballet dancer at the Opéra de Paris and the wife of Pierre Gardel.

== Early life ==
Marie-Elisabeth-Anne Houbert was born on 8 April 1770 in Auxonne, France. Marie's father was a musician in the Royal Artillery Corps (French: Corps Royal de l'Artillerie) and died when she was a young girl.

== Entertainment life ==
Her mother's second husband, Jean-Gaspard Krasinski, nicknamed "Miller", was a Polish composer and flautist who had a large impact on Marie's life. The composer's connections with notable choreographers, established upon his move to Paris, greatly contributed to advancing his daughter-in-law's future. In 1782, Marie joined the dance school of the Théâtre des Beaujolais to learn the art of stage dancing.

In Antonio Sacchini's opera Dardanus, Mademoiselle Miller made her debut in front of King Louis XVI and Queen Marie Antoinette at the Château de Fontainebleau on 20 and 27 October 1785. On 13 January 1786, the young ballerina performed in its premiere at the Académie Royale de Musique (known as Paris Opéra). By April 1786, Marie, at the age of 16, was being paid 1,500 livres, with an additional gratuity of the same amount.

Not long after, she appeared in Maximilien Gardel's Le Déserteur with music composed by her stepfather and first performed on 21 October 1786. French dancer and choreographer Pierre Gardel had assumed the role of ballet master at the Opéra after his brother Maximilien in the late 1780s. When Pierre, the young ballet master at the Opéra, agreed to mentor Marie, she gratefully adopted her father-in-law's nickname as her stage name. It was only upon marriage at 25 that she ceased to use the name "Mlle Miller" on stage.

Marie quickly earned the rank of première danseuse before the French Revolution. Shortly afterward, the dancer succeeded Marie-Madeleine Guimard, who retired around 1789.

In Gardel's 1790 ballet Télémaque dans l'île de Calypso with music composed by her stepfather, Mlle Miller was cast as "Eucharis", Armand Vestris as "Télémaque", and Clotilde as "Calypso". That same year, she was cast in one of the earliest full-length ballets by the Opéra's ballet master titled Psyché. The young Houbert performed in the title role of "Psyché" in its premiere at the Opéra on 14 December 1790.

In 1793, Mlle Miller visited King's Theatre in London for a guest performance.

Back in Paris, Marie married Pierre Gardel on 24 December 1795, becoming his second wife and muse. After his first wife, Anne Jacqueline Coulon, died, the widow decided to remarry. Following her marriage to Pierre, now known on stage by Madame Gardel (or Mme Gardel), she was active as a principal dancer at the Opéra de Paris, alongside Mlle Chevigny. She continued to perform in all of Pierre's ballet compositions.

In Gardel's 1802 Paul et Virginie, she played a notable role as "Virginie". She was cast in Le triomphe du mois de Mars, ou le Berceau d'Achille on 27 March 1811. Mme Gardel appeared as "August (Aout)" with Albert (June) and Mlle Bigottini (July).

In 1816, Mme Gardel concluded a stage career that spanned nearly thirty years. A pension of 4000 francs was awarded to the retired dancer in recognition of her services.

== Death ==
Marie Gardel died on 18 April 1833 in Paris, France. Her husband Pierre lived until 1840.

== See also ==
- Women in dance
- Pierre Gardel
- Paris Opera
