= Télémaque dans l'île de Calypso =

1790 ballet-pantomime

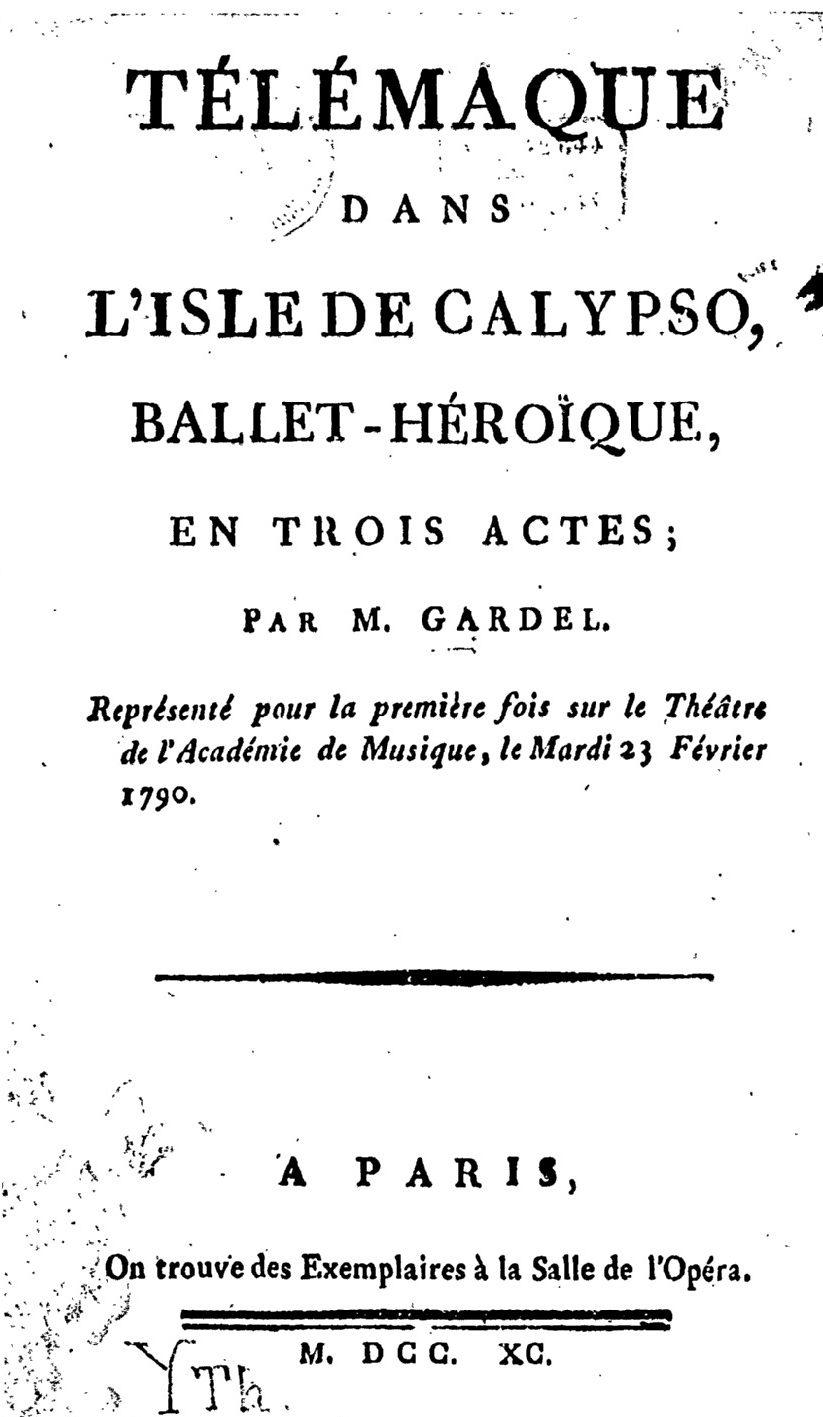
- Native title: Télémaque dans l'île de Calypso
- Choreographer: Pierre Gardel
- Music: Ernest-Louis Miller
- Premiere: 23 February 1790; Opéra de Paris
- Genre: Pantomime
- Type: Ballet

Télémaque dans l'île de Calypso (French pronunciation: [telemak dɑ̃ lil də kalipso], transl. Telemachus on the Island of Calypso) is a French ballet-pantomime created in 1790 by Pierre Gardel and performed at the Opéra de Paris.

== Background ==
The ballet Télémaque dans l'île de Calypso was presented in three acts by Pierre Gardel with music composed by Ernest-Louis Miller (Müller). Gardel developed the choreography.

On 23 February 1790, Télémaque dans l'île de Calypso was premiered at the Opéra de Paris. It was performed until 1816, reinstated in 1819, and remained in the repertoire until 24 November 1866. Gardel's ability to combine character-driven pantomime with dance and the ballet's execution received contemporary praise.

== Roles ==
The main roles in the premiere of Gardel's ballet were entrusted to artists such as:

Role	Première cast, 23 February 1790 (Cast member: - )
Calypso	Miss Saulnier
Venus	Miss de Ligny
Love (L'Amour)	Miss Chameroy
Minerva (in the guise of Mentor)	Mr. Huard
Eucharis	Mlle Miller
Telemachus	Pierre Gardel
Leucothoe	Mme Pérignon
Ircile	Mlle Rose
Les Graces	Mlles Jacotot, Beaujon, and Nanine

== Synopsis ==
Translated to English as Telemachus on the Island of Calypso, the French ballet is based on the story from Greek mythology where Telemachus, the son of Odysseus, visits the island of Calypso.

=== Act 1 ===
Act I opens on Calypso's island, where a storm subsides. Mentor and Telemachus, survivors of a shipwreck, arrive on the shore, mourning their lost companions. Mentor warns of the island’s dangers, but Calypso and her nymphs greet them warmly. Calypso, recognizing Telemachus as Odysseus's son, takes a special interest in him. She organizes games, where nymph Eucharis wins multiple contests and captures Telemachus’s attention. Despite Mentor’s warnings, Telemachus is drawn to her. Calypso confesses her love and offers him immortality. The act ends with festivities fading into the night.

=== Act 2 ===
The second act begins with Telemachus sleeping in a garden, and Calypso, in love, has nymphs prepare a garland for him. He meets Eucharis and, though charmed, remains cautious. Meanwhile, Venus grants Calypso Cupid’s power, causing romantic confusion among the nymphs. Telemachus and Eucharis's attraction deepens, leading to a passionate exchange. Mentor manipulates Calypso's jealousy to help Telemachus escape. Reluctantly, Calypso allows his departure, and preparations for a ship are made. The act ends with Calypso’s anguish and ominous threats to Eucharis.

=== Act 3 ===
In act III, Eucharis prepares for a hunt in her grotto, with help from Venus, Love, and the Graces. Calypso, disguised as Diana, confronts her out of jealousy, but Telemachus steps in to protect her. Calypso hesitates to act. Mentor, disguised as Minerva, completes a ship to take Telemachus away. Love and the nymphs seduce Telemachus back into Eucharis's arms, causing him to change his mind. Calypso, pretending to repent, manipulates them into hiding Eucharis on the ship. The ship is set ablaze by Bacchantes, but Love rescues Eucharis. As the ship burns, Telemachus and Mentor jump into the sea, and the curtain falls on the chaos.
