= Vera Shvetsova =

Russian-born ballerina and ballet teacher(1929–2011)

Vera Shvetsova (1929–2011) was a Russian-born ballet teacher and balletmaster. She was trained by the famous teacher Vaganova and was one of Vaganova’s best students.

== Life and career ==
Vera Shvetsova was born in Cherepovets, Russia in 1929. Like her teacher, Shvetsova worked in several colleges, conservatories, and academies of dance in different countries (Poland, Germany, Hungary, etc.), including at The College of Ballet and Choreography in Minsk, (Belarus),

She danced in The Mali of Saint Petersburg (Russia) and The Great Theater of Opera and Ballet of Riga, Latvia (The Latvian National Opera in our time). Her pupils included Tatiana Stepanova and Andrei Rimashevsky.

Shvetsova died in Belarus in 2011.

== Honours and awards ==
- 1958: Emerite Artist of Latvia

== Sources ==
- Grigorovich, Yuriy Nikolayevich (1981). Balet Entsiklopediya, Moskva: Izdatelstvo "Sovetskaya Entsiklopediya". OCLC 7946949.
