= Louis Milon =

French ballet dancer, choreographer, and ballet master

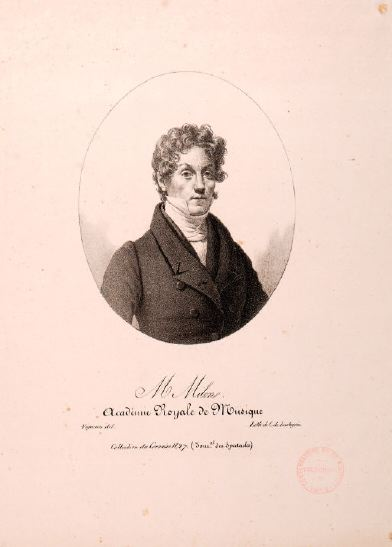
Louis Milon

Louis-Jacques-Jessé Milon (18 April 1766 – 26 November 1849) was a French ballet dancer, choreographer, and ballet master.

== Life ==
Born in Saint-Martin de Caux, his widowed mother brought him to Paris, where they lived near the Boulevard du Temple. The Théâtre des Élèves pour la Danse de l'Opéra opened there not long after their arrival, and Milon's interest was piqued. He was soon filling in as a Saracen on the city walls in the five-act pantomime La Jérusalem délivrée. By the age of fourteen, he was playing pantomime and comedy and dancing at the Variétés Amusantes.

Later he began studying dance at the Paris Opera Ballet School, joining the corps de ballet of the school's parent company in 1787 and making a favorable impression as the Grand Cousin in Maximilien Gardel's Le déserteur on 16 January 1788 and as the Mentor in Pierre Gardel's Télémaque on 23 February 1790. He became double in 1791 and was only promoted to replacement in the noble genre in 1799, before retiring as a dancer in 1800.

He created his first ballet, Pygmalion, at the Théâtre de l'Ambigu-Comique in 1799 with his sister-in-law, Émilie Bigottini, as the star. It was so successful, that he was invited to stage it at the Opéra, where it was first presented on 20 August 1800.

After successfully creating Héro et Léandre at the Opéra on 31 December 1799, he became assistant ballet master to Pierre Gardel, with whom he worked in great harmony. Their collaboration, Les Noces de Gamache, with a libretto by Milon based on comic episodes from Cervantes's novel Don Quixote, premiered on 18 January 1801 and was retained in the repertory until 1841. He continued to teach and created many other works for the company until his retirement in 1826.

Many of his ballets were also produced in the main stages of Europe. In parallel to his choreography career, he was also the last "Grand Professeur" of pantomime at the Opéra.

He died in Neuilly-sur-Seine in 1849.

Though not revolutionary, his works were well in line with the tastes of the time and perfectly legible for audiences. With Bigottini, Milon put on pieces full of fantasy and humour as well as melodramas, with the latter having great success right up until the rise of romantic ballet around 1830.

== Selected works ==
- 1799 : Pygmalion
- 1799 : Héro et Léandre
- 1801 : Les Noces de Gamache
- 1803 : Lucas et Laurette
- 1813 : L'Enlèvement des Sabines
- 1813 : Nina ou la Folle par amour
- 1815 : L'Épreuve villageoise
- 1816 : Le Carnaval de Venise
- 1820 : Clari ou la Promesse de mariage
