= Maximilien Gardel =

French ballet dancer and choreographer (1741–1787)

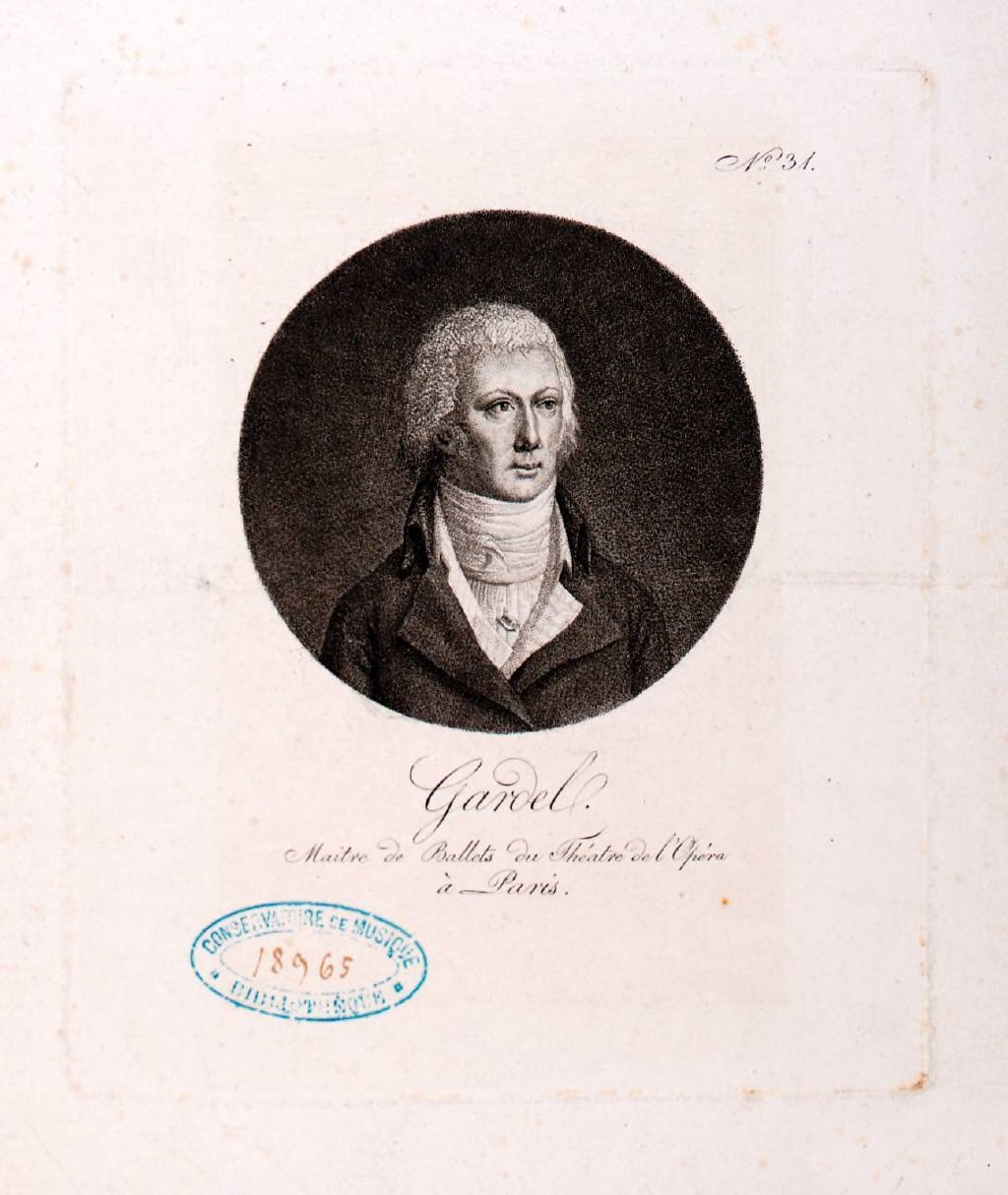
- Born: Maximilien Gardel; 18 December 1741; Mannheim, Baden-Württemberg, Germany
- Died: 11 March 1787 (aged 45); Paris, France
- Occupations: Dancer; Ballet Master

Maximilien Gardel (18 December 1741, in Mannheim – 11 March 1787, in Paris) was a French ballet dancer and choreographer of German descent.

== Biography ==
He was the son of Claude Gardel, ballet master to King Stanisław Leszczyński, and elder brother by 17 years of Pierre Gardel.

Gardel débuted at the Académie royale de Musique in Paris in 1759 and five years later became a soloist. Sharing roles as principal dancer (danseur noble) with Gaétan Vestris, Gardel took steps to distinguish himself from his rival in 1772: in the reprise of Rameau's Castor et Pollux, he danced with neither mask nor wig (then judged unimaginable) so as not to be confused with the other dancer.

In 1773, Gardel, with Jean Dauberval, became Vestris' assistant as ballet master. In 1781, Gardel took over the position (succeeding Noverre).

Upon Gardel's death in 1787, his brother Pierre succeeded him as ballet master.

== Selected works ==
- 1777 : La Chercheuse d'esprit
- 1777 : Ninette à la cour
- 1778 : Phaon
- 1779 : Mirza et Lindor
- 1781 : La Fête de Mirza
- 1783 : La Rosière
- 1784 : L'Oracle
- 1785 : Le Premier Navigateur
- 1786 : Les Sauvages
- 1786 : Le Pied de bœuf
- 1786 : Le Déserteur
- 1787 : Le Coq du village

| Preceded by Jean-Georges Noverre | Director of the Ballet l'Opéra de Paris; 1781-1787 | Succeeded by Pierre Gardel |
