= Émilie Bigottini =

French dancer (1784-1858)

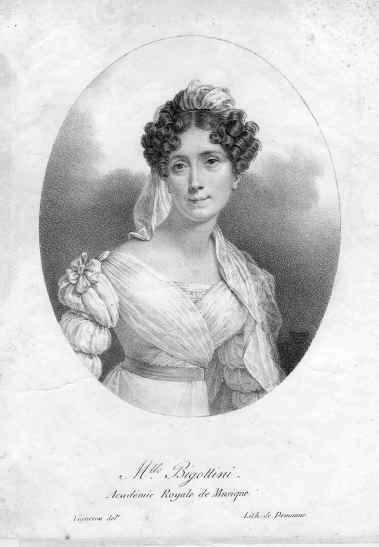
- Émilie Bigottini. Engraving by Demanne after a portrait by Pierre-Roch Vigneron. (c. 1810).
- Born: Émilie Bigottini; 16 April 1784; Toulouse, France
- Died: 28 April 1858 (aged 74); Paris, France
- Other name: Mlle Bigottini
- Occupation: Dancer

Émilie Bigottini (16 April 1784, in Toulouse – 28 April 1858, in Paris) was a French dancer of Italian ancestry.

The daughter of Francesco Bigottini, a famous harlequin at Paris's Comédie-Italienne, she joined the Opéra ballet at age 17 and led its company until her retirement in 1823, distinguishing herself in the ballets of Louis Milon. Napoleon I of France was one of her fervent admirers.

Despite her numerous liaisons, she escaped the reputation for immorality which afflicted most of her contemporaries in the dance world. She was considered as an example of good artistic taste, svelte, precise and excelling in mime.

She had several children, all out of wedlock:

- a daughter with Gérard Christophe Michel Duroc, duke of Frioul;
- a daughter, Armandine Alphonsine Pignatelli d'Aragon Bigottini, born in Paris on April 10, 1807. The child's father, the prince Pignatelli, eventually recognized her. Armandine married Alphonse Daloz in 1827, and had two children; she died in Créteil on August 11, 1833.
- a son, François Jean Charles, born in Paris on August 27, 1815. The child was conceived during the Congress of Vienna and his father presumed to be an Austrian count. (Bigottini had accompanied Charles-Maurice de Talleyrand-Périgord to Vienna in 1814.)

== Sources ==
- Félix-Bouvier, Une danseuse de l'Opéra, la Bigottini (Paris, Noël Charavay, 1909).
