= Ballet master =

High-level member of a ballet company

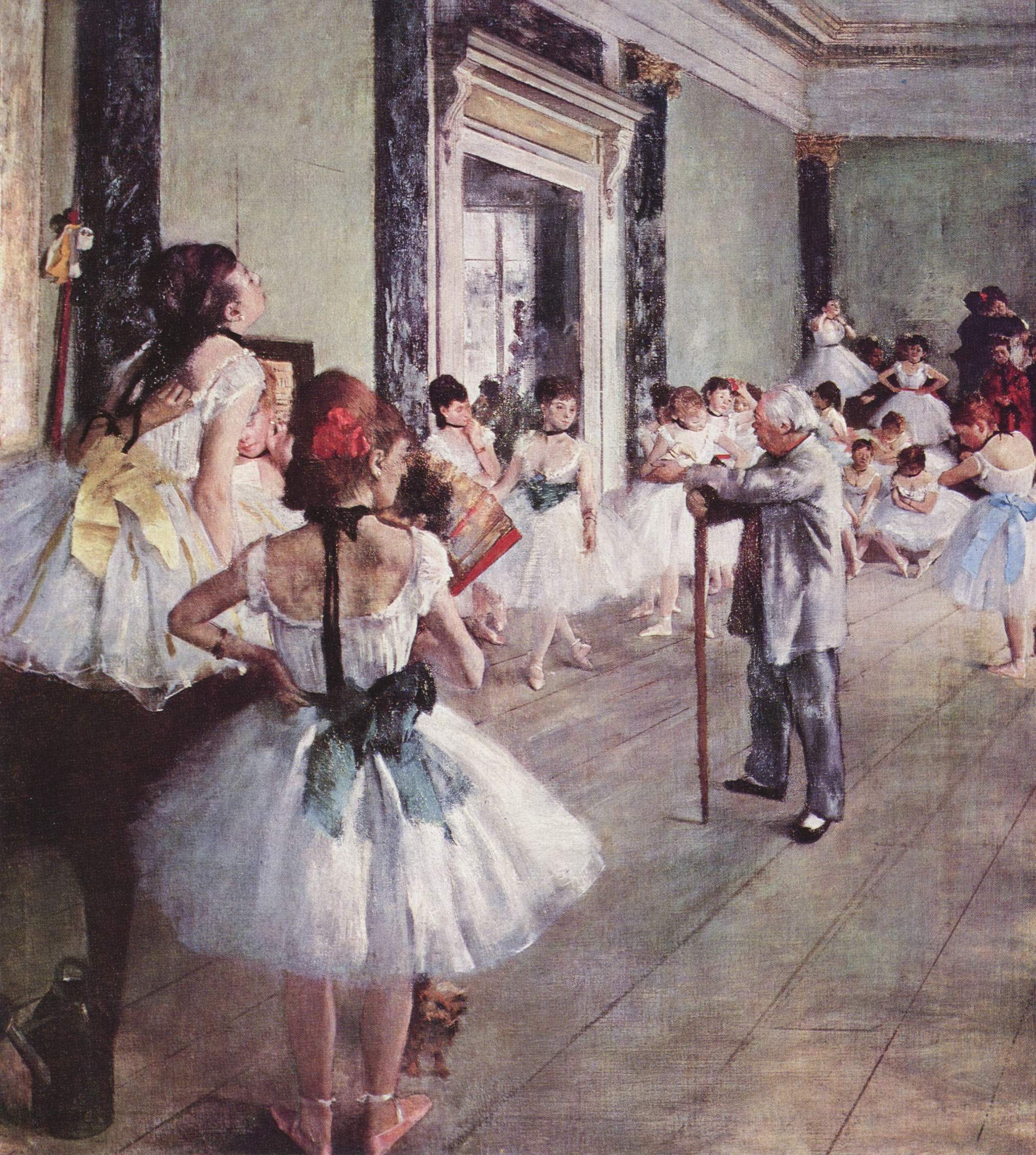
Edgar Degas' painting of the ballet master Jules Perrot conducting rehearsal in the Foyer de la Danse of the Palais Garnier, Paris, 1875

A ballet master (also balletmaster, ballet mistress, premier maître de ballet or premier maître de ballet en chef) is an employee of a ballet company who is responsible for the level of competence of the dancers in their company. In modern times, ballet masters are generally charged with teaching the daily company ballet class and rehearsing the dancers for both new and established ballets in the company's repertoire. The artistic director of a ballet company, whether a male or female, may also be called its ballet master. Historic use of gender marking in job titles in ballet (and live theatre) is being supplanted by gender-neutral language job titles regardless of an employee's gender (e.g. ballet master in lieu of ballet mistress, wig master as an alternative to wig mistress).

== History of the position ==
Especially during the early centuries of ballet troupes and ballet companies from the 18th century until the early 20th century, the position of first ballet master, referred to traditionally as the premier maître de ballet en chef or more simply as the maître de ballet, was the undisputed head of the company who acted as chief choreographer and artistic director. His duties included creating ballets, dances in operas, commissioning music, and presiding over the teaching of the dancers and style desired. It was this head ballet master who had the responsibility of the artistic directorship of a particular group of dancers or of a theatre. Since the early 20th century, primarily after the disbandment of the original Ballets Russes, the title has been used more to describe the master teachers/assistant directors of a ballet company, (previously known as second ballet master), with the head of a company being referred to as the artistic director.

In recent years, companies have quietly begun to change the title's name given its hierarchical and dominating connotations. They have switched the name of the position to various titles such as Principal Teacher, Artistic Manager, and other such titles to avoid the politically charged word "master."

== Famous ballet masters ==
- Pierre Beauchamp (1631–1705), first ballet master of the Ballet du Théâtre de l'Académie Royale de Musique in Paris from 1673 to 1687, he invented the comédie-ballet with Molière and Jean-Baptiste Lully, codified the five positions of the feet and created a system of dance notation.
- Jean-Baptiste Landé (died 1748), ballet master in Russia from 1733 to 1747; he is known as the parent of the Russian Mariinsky Ballet.
- Jean-Georges Noverre (1727–1810), ballet master of the Stuttgart Ballet from 1760 to 1767, of the Wiener Hofoper in Vienna from 1768 to 1775 and of the Ballet du Théâtre de l'Académie Royale de Musique from 1776 to 1781. Between 1758 and 1760 he published his Lettres sur la danse et les ballets. He is generally considered the creator of ballet d'action, a precursor of the narrative ballet of the 19th century.
- Louis Gallodier (1734–1803), ballet master in Sweden from 1773 to 1803; he is known as the parent of the Royal Swedish Ballet.
- Jean Dauberval (1742–1806), ballet master of the Ballet du Théâtre de l'Académie Royale de Musique from 1781 to 1783; he is known today as the father of the comedic ballet.
- Pierre-Gabriel Gardel (1758–1840), ballet master of the Ballet du Théâtre de l'Académie Royale de Musique from 1787 to 1820. After Noverre he defended the ballet d'action in the early 19th century.
- Salvatore Viganò (1769–1821), ballet master of the Wiener Hofoper from 1799 to 1803. Ballet master of La Scala Theatre Ballet in Milan from 1811 to 1821. He is considered the father of a new kind of performance called coreodramma.
- Filippo Taglioni (1777–1871), ballet master of the Royal Swedish Ballet in Stockholm from 1803 to 1804 and 1817–1818. Born and trained as a dancer in his native Italy, he is known today as the father of Romantic ballet. Also a great choreographer and teacher, he was instrumental in the training of his daughter, Marie Taglioni.
- Jean Coralli (1779–1854), ballet master of the Ballet du Théâtre de l'Académie Royale de Musique from 1831 to 1850. He was born Jean Coralli Perecini to Bolognese parents in Paris.
- Carlo Blasis (1797–1878), ballet master of La Scala Theatre Ballet School in Milan from 1838 to 1853. He was the first to publish a complete analysis of ballet techniques in 1820, in a work named Traité élémentaire, théorique, et pratique de l'art de la danse ("Elementary Treaty on the Art of the Dance, Theory and Practice").
- Joseph Mazilier, born Giulio Mazarini (1801–1868), ballet master of the Paris Opera Ballet from 1853 to 1859. Ballet master of the Théatre Royal de la Monnaie in Brussels from 1866 to 1867. His creations witnessed the switch of the European center of dance from Paris to Saint Petersburg with the end of the Second Empire.
- August Bournonville (1805–1879), ballet master of the Royal Danish Ballet from 1828 to 1879 and the most prolific choreographer Denmark has ever known.
- Paul Taglioni (1808–1883), Deuxieme Maître de Ballet of the Ballet of Her Majesty's Theatre from 1847 to 1848, Maître de Ballet en Chef from 1849 to 1851. Maître de Ballet en Chef of the Court Opera Ballet in Berlin from 1852 to 1866.
- Jules Perrot (1810–1892), Maître de Ballet en Chef (first ballet master) of the Ballet of Her Majesty's Theatre from 1843 to 1848. Maître de Ballet en Chef to the St. Petersburg Imperial Theatres from 1849 to 1859.
- Christian Johansson (1817–1903), coaching ballet master/master teacher for the Russian Imperial Ballet from 1880 to 1900, particularly of the male students.
- Marius Petipa (1818–1910), Maître de Ballet of the St. Petersburg Imperial Theatres from 1871 to 1903, Deuxieme Maître de Ballet from 1862 to 1871. "The Father of Classical Ballet".
- Arthur Saint-Léon, born Arthur Michel (1821–1870), a Frenchman who was ballet master of the Paris Opera Ballet from 1850 to 1853, then Maître de Ballet en Chef of the St. Petersburg Imperial Theatres from 1859 until 1869.
- Lev Ivanov (1834–1901), Deuxieme Maître de Ballet of the St. Petersburg Imperial Theatres from 1885 to 1901.
- Enrico Cecchetti (1850–1928), ballet master for the Ballets Russes 1910.
- Nicolai Legat (1869–1937), ballet master in Russia.
- Agrippina Vaganova (1879–1951), ballet master of the Kirov Ballet from 1931 to 1937. She developed the Vaganova method.
- Michel Fokine (1880–1942), ballet master of the Mariinsky Ballet from 1904 to 1909. Choreographer of the Ballets Russes in Paris from 1909 to 1923. Ballet master of the Royal Danish Ballet in 1925.
- George Balanchine (1904–1983), ballet master of the Royal Danish Ballet from 1930 to 1931. Ballet master and director of the New York City Ballet, in New York from 1949 to 1982.
- Frederick Ashton (1904–1988), ballet master, choreographer, and director of England's Royal Ballet from 1963 to 1970.
- Serge Lifar (1905–1986), ballet master of the Paris Opera Ballet from 1930 to 1944 and 1947–1958. One of the precursors of the neoclassical style.
- Alexander Ivanovich Pushkin (1907–1970), ballet master; among his students were Mikhail Baryshnikov and Rudolf Nureyev.
- María de Ávila (1920-2014), ballet master and the creator of the Ballet de Zaragoza.
- Roland Petit (1924–2011), ballet master of the Ballet national de Marseille from 1972 to 1998.
- Maurice Béjart (1927–2007), ballet master of the Théatre Royal de la Monnaie in Brussels from 1959 to 1987 where he founded the Ballet du XXe Siècle. Then he ran the Béjart Ballet Lausanne in Switzerland from 1987 to 2007.
- Kenneth MacMillan (1929–1992), ballet master of the Deutsche Oper Berlin from 1966 to 1969. Ballet master, choreographer, and director of England's Royal Ballet from 1970 to 1977.
- Vera Shvetsova (born 1929), ballet master of the State School of Ballet and Choreography of Minsk (Belarus).
- Rudolph Nureyev (1938–1993), ballet master and director of the Paris Opera Ballet from 1983 to 1992. Before that, he enjoyed an illustrious career as a dancer in both the Soviet Union and in the west.
- Anthony Dowell (born 1943), ballet master and director of England's Royal Ballet from 1986 to 2001.
- John Neumeier (born 1939), ballet master of the Hamburg Opera Ballet from 1973.
- Laurent Hilaire (born 1962), ballet master of the Paris Opera Ballet from 2005.
- Igor Moiseyev (1906-2007), ballet master of the Bolshoi Ballet and later on the Igor Moiseyev Ballet. One of the greatest masters of character dance

== Gallery of ballet masters ==
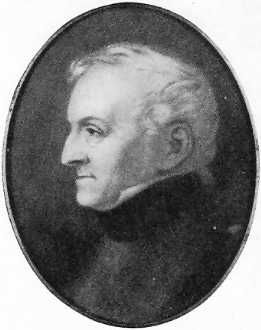
Filippo Taglioni, circa 1820

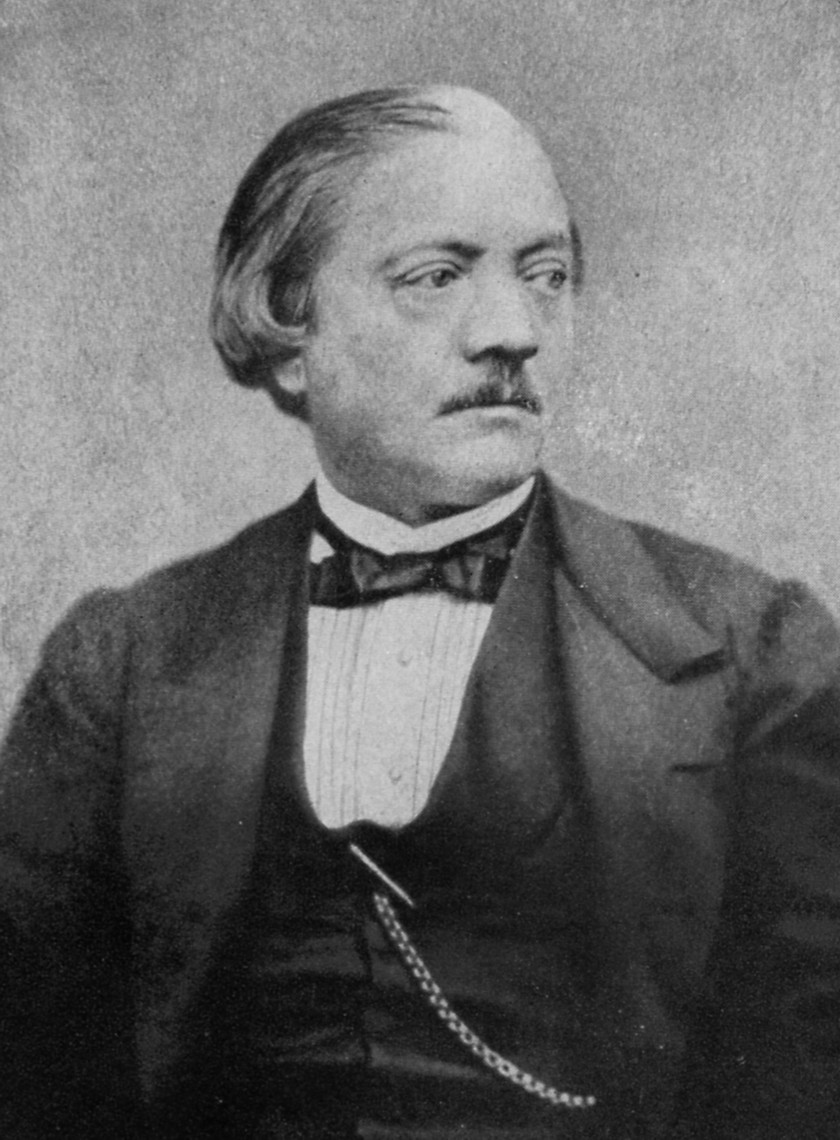
Jules Perrot, circa 1850

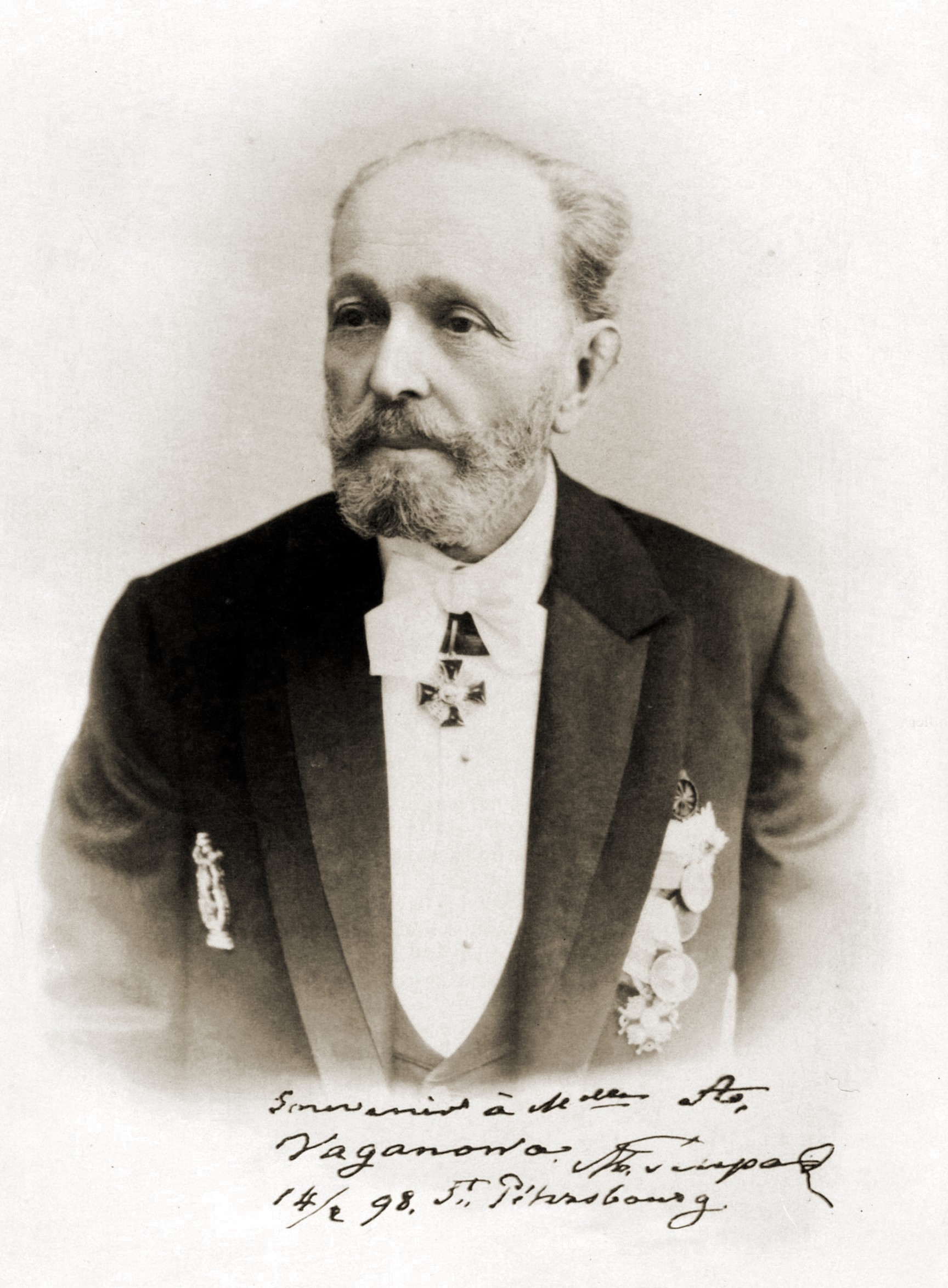
Marius Ivanovich Petipa

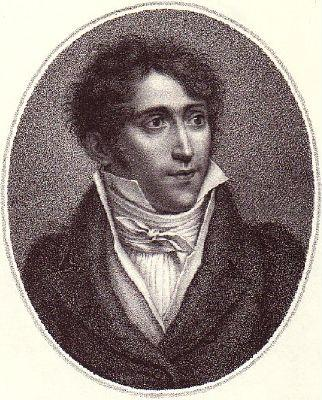
Jean Coralli, one of the creators of the ballet Giselle, Paris, circa 1810

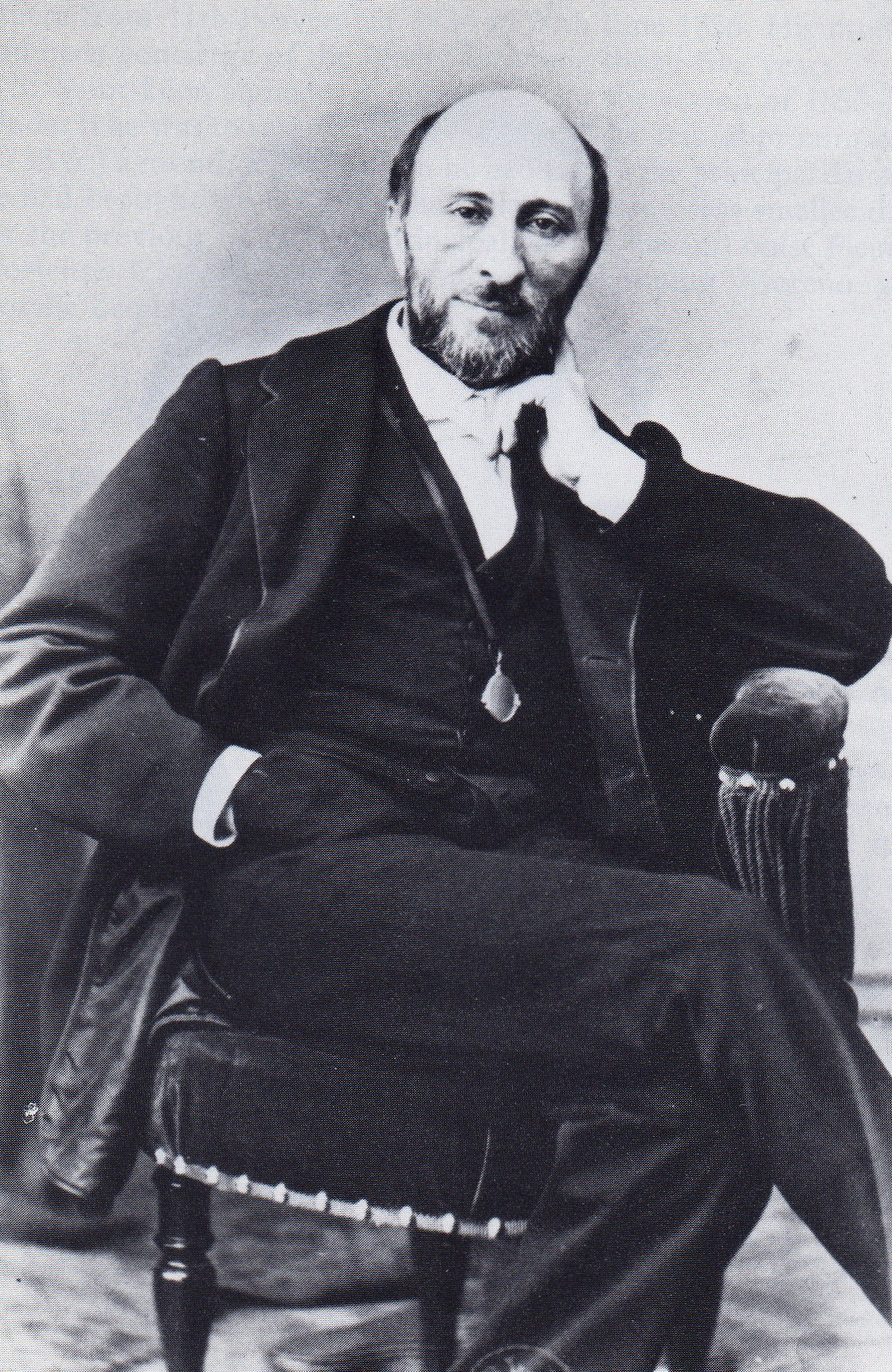
Arthur Saint-Léon, Paris, circa 1865

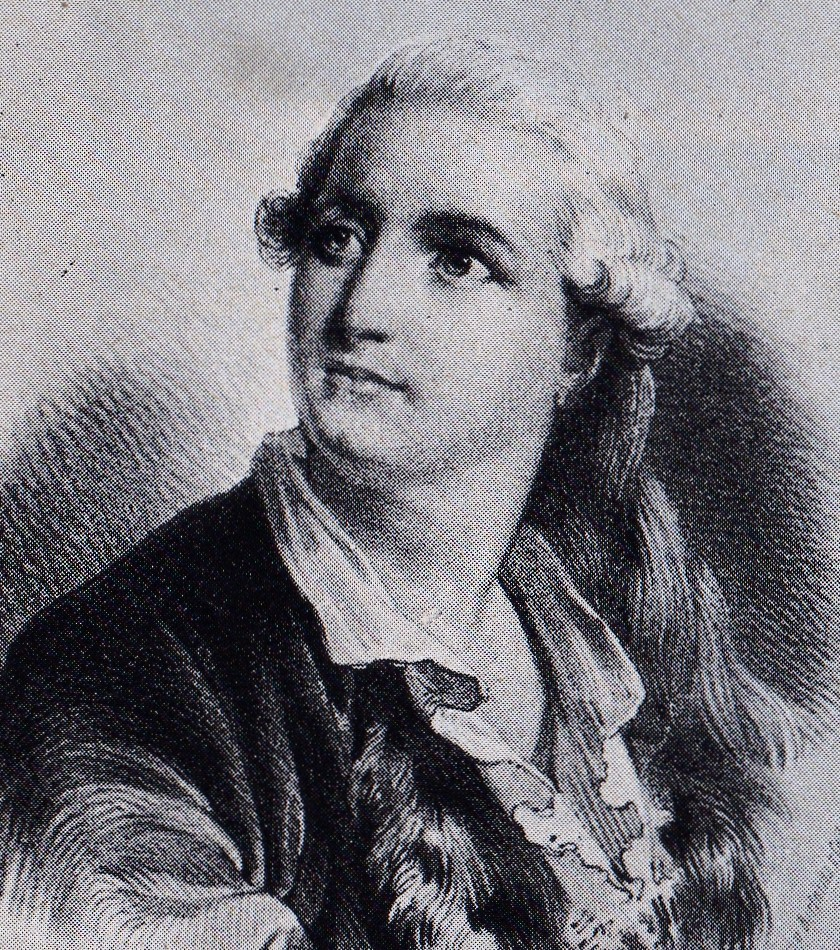
Lithograph of Jean Dauberval, Paris, circa 1790

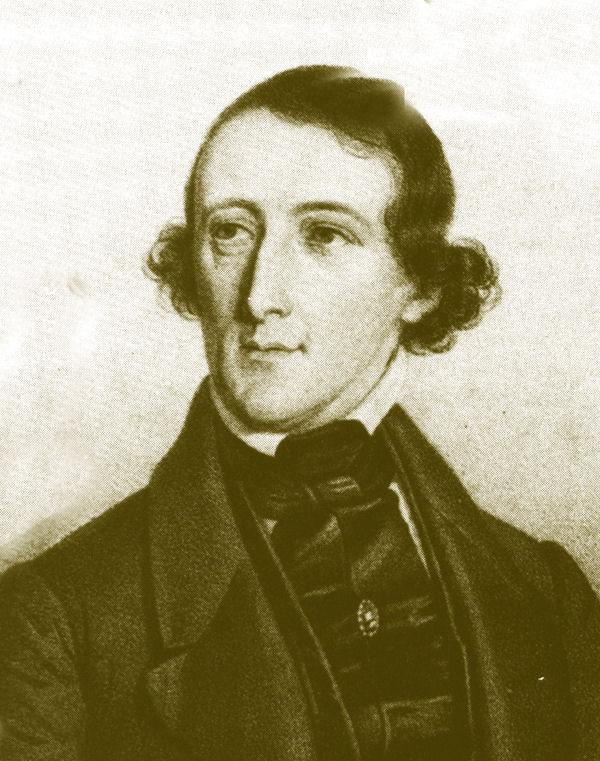
August Bournonville, 1841

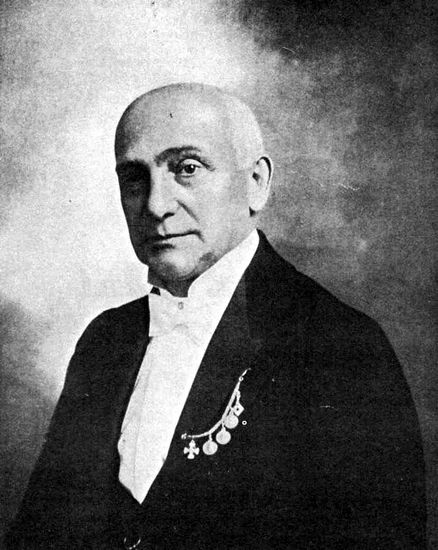
Enrico Cecchetti, St. Petersburg, circa 1900
