= Pierre Gardel =

French ballet dancer, ballet master, violinist, and composer (1758–1840)

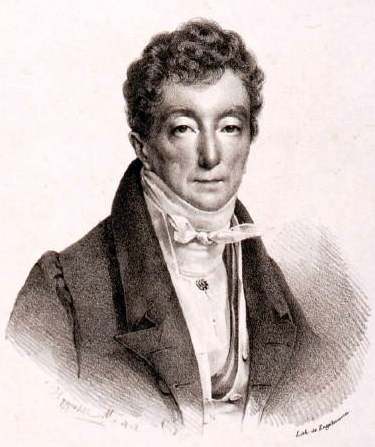
- Born: Pierre Gardel; 4 February 1758; Nancy, France
- Died: 18 October 1840 (aged 82); Paris, France
- Occupations: Dancer; Ballet Master

Pierre-Gabriel Gardel (French pronunciation: [pjɛʁ ɡabʁijɛl ɡaʁdɛl]; 4 February 1758, in Nancy, France – 18 October 1840, in Paris) was a French ballet dancer, ballet master, violinist, and composer. He was the son of Claude Gardel and the younger brother of Maximilien Gardel, seventeen years his senior. In 1795 he married the dancer Marie Miller, whom he showcased in many of his works.

== Career ==
Entering the school of the Opéra de Paris (Paris Opera) in 1772, he began his studies under his brother's watch. He became a soloist in 1780, but had to give up his performing career for health reasons, paired with the rising jealousy of his contemporary Auguste Vestris, who was a natural technician. Upon his brother Maximillien's death in 1787, Pierre took over as the Opera's ballet master.

Assisted by Louis Milon, Gardel went on to head the Ballet de l'Opéra de Paris for 40 years, adapting to the turmoil of the French Revolution and the reign of Napoleon.

His first three ballets: Le Jugement de Pâris (1787), Psyché (1790), Télémaque (1790) drew upon classical myths and were considered compatible with the old regime. As the French Revolution caused a political upheaval, Gardel created patriotic dances which combined political content with neoclassical ideas. He collaborated with Jacques-Louis David, a painter who shared Gardel's views on showcasing the Revolution's ideas in works of art. In L'Offrande à la Liberté (1792) Gardel reproduced the events of the Revolution as an opera with music composed by François-Joseph Gossec. It included the revolutionary national anthem The Marseillaise, which was sung on stage.

Pierre Gardel argued that strong technical dancing was equally important to a ballet's story and theatrics. He was influenced by Noverre's reforms, although Gardel didn't see the need to limit technique when including pantomime. He kept mime to a minimum and cast those with natural dramatic ability. His choreography offered dancers what he saw as challenging and dramatic work. Outside of the Opera ballet masters were focusing on pantomime. It was at this time that Gardel enabled changes in the training to reflect his focus on expanding technique to encompass great bodily feats. Gardel allowed and encouraged the creation of divertissements for the dancers. Auguste Vestris was a principal dancer at this time and well known for pushing the boundaries of turning and jumping. The very thing that caused Gardel discomfort as a dancer became valuable once Gardel became the Opéra's ballet master.

The uniformity of training that the Opera is known for was first seen under his rule. Criticized for not allowing outside choreographers access to his dancers "he kept them in a type of artistic isolation." (Au 42) Some argue that Gardel's leadership was the reason that so few notable dancers emerged from the Opera during and in the years that followed his reign. A talented choreographer, he enthused the public from his first productions in 1790 right through to those just before his retirement. In 1820 he began lessening his work load, opting to create works for the operas, rather than full ballets. From 1820, the creation of ballets was transferred to Jean-Pierre Aumer, although Gardel didn't step down from his position and fully retire until 1827.

== Main works ==
All put on at the Opéra de Paris.

- 1784 : Dardanus
- 1786 : Les Sauvages
- 1790 : Télémaque dans l'île de Calypso
- 1790 : Psyché
- 1791 : Bacchus et Ariane
- 1793 : Le Jugement de Pâris
- 1800 : La Dansomanie
- 1802 : Le Retour de Zéphire
- 1803 : Daphnis et Pandore
- 1804 : Une demi-heure de caprice
- 1804 : Achille à Scyros
- 1806 : Paul et Virginie
- 1808 : Vénus et Adonis
- 1808 : Alexandre chez Apelles
- 1809 : La Fête de Mars
- 1810 : Vertumne et Pomone
- 1810 : Persée et Andromède
- 1812 : L'enfant prodigue
- 1814 : Le Retour des lys
- 1815 : L'Heureux Retour
- 1817 : Les Fiancé de Caserte
- 1818 : Proserpine
- 1818 : Zirphile
- 1818 : La Servante justifiée

Preceded by Maximilien Gardel	Director of the Ballet l'Opéra de Paris; 1787–1820	Succeeded by Jean-Pierre Aumer
