= Silvain (opera) =

French opéra-comique by Jean-François Marmontel

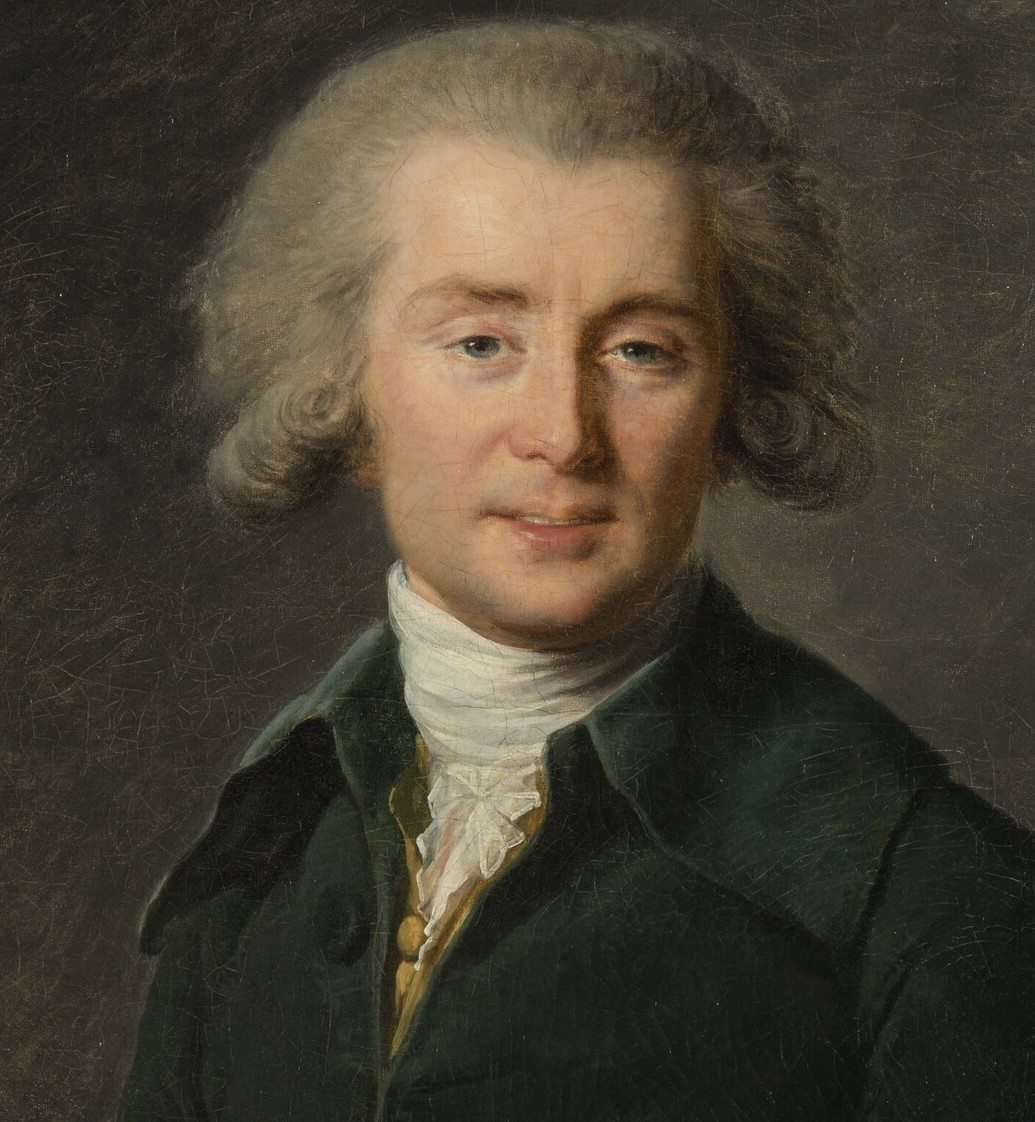
André Grétry

Silvain (spelt Sylvain in the 1771 libretto) is a one-act opéra-comique by André Grétry with a libretto by Jean-François Marmontel. It was first performed at the Comédie-Italienne (the Opéra Comique) on 19 February 1770 and was one of Grétry's biggest early successes. The plot concerns Silvain, who works as a poor farmer after being disinherited by his rich father for marrying a lower-class woman. The pastoral theme and its celebration of rural life was common in opéra-comique of the time but Marmontel's libretto goes much further in advocating social equality and defending the rights of peasants against the encroachment of landowners.

== Background ==
Marmontel's chief source was Erast, a one-act play by the Swiss writer Salomon Gessner, who enjoyed a considerable European vogue at the time. Erast is an impoverished mountain farmer whose servant Simon decides to "rob the rich to pay the poor" and feed his master's and other destitute families. Erast orders Simon to return the money to the wealthy traveller he has waylaid. It emerges that the traveller is Erast's father who is searching for the son he disinherited long ago for marrying beneath him and now regrets his decision. Marmontel changed the focus to deal with an issue of great contemporary relevance in Ancien Régime France, the question of peasants' traditional rights to use land. These rights included grazing on common land, collecting wood for fuel and gathering stubble after the harvest. French peasants' livelihoods were often so precarious that they were dependent on such rights to avoid complete destitution. According to Melchior Grimm, some of the aristocratic members among the early audiences of Silvain objected to what they saw as its preaching of social equality. The Duc de Noailles is said to have exclaimed that the opera's message was that he should marry his servant girl and let his peasants poach.

== Performance history ==
Silvain was one of the most popular of Grétry's early operas. It enjoyed 381 performances at the Opéra Comique between 1770 and 1827. In 1796 Silvain became the first recorded opera to be performed in New Orleans. Loewenberg lists productions in the Low Countries, Germany, Austria, Denmark, Sweden and Russia up to 1800.

== Roles ==
Role	Voice type	Premiere Cast
Dolmon, the father	basse-taille (bass-baritone)	M. Suin
Dolmon, his elder son (going under the name of "Silvain")	baritone	Joseph Caillot
Dolmon, his younger son	spoken role	Antoine Trial
Hélène, Silvain's wife	soprano	Marie-Thérèse Laruette
Pauline and Lucette, daughters of Silvain and Hélène	sopranos	Marie-Jeanne Trial and Pétronille-Rosalie Beaupré
Bazile, a young villager	tenor	Clairval
Dolmon's guards	tenor and basse-taille	not reported

== Synopsis ==
Scene: in front of a peasant's house, behind which is a small wood.

Fifteen years earlier, the noble Silvain disobeyed the wishes of his father Dolmon by marrying a lower-class woman, Hélène. Dolmon disinherited his son, who now earns his living as a humble farmer. When the gamekeepers of the new local landowner accuse Silvain of poaching, Silvain's wife and daughters plead for mercy. Silvain enters and recognises the landowner as his own father. Dolmon relents and the family is at last reconciled.

== Recordings ==
The opera has not been recorded complete. The overture appears on Grétry: Suites and Overtures, Orchestre de Bretagne, conducted by Stefan Sanderling (ASV, 2001). Christiane Karg sings the aria Il va venir! ... Pardonne, o mon juge on the album Amoretti (Berlin Classics, 2013).

== Sources ==
=== Period sources ===
- Original libretto: Silvain, Comédie en un Acte, Meslée d'Ariettes; par M. Marmontel, de l'Académie Française, Paris, Merlin, 1770 (accessible for free online at the Library of Congress)
- Period libretto: Sylvain, Comédie en un acte, mêlée d'ariettes, Paris, Comédie Italienne, 1771 (accessible for free online at Internet Archive)
- Period printed score: Silvain Comédie en un acte et en verses, Dédiée à son Altesse Royale Monseigneur le Prince Charles de Pologne, Duc de Saxe, de Curlande et de Senigalle, Paris Dezauche, s.d. (accessible for free online at Internet Archive)

=== Modern sources ===
- Michel Brenet Grétry: sa vie et ses œuvres (F. Hayez, 1884)
- David Charlton Grétry and the Growth of Opéra Comique (Cambridge University Press, 1986)
- Ronald Lessens Grétry ou Le triomphe de l'Opéra-Comique (L'Harmattan, 2007)
- Alfred Loewenberg Annals of Opera 1597-1940 (Third edition, Calder, 1978)
