= 1769 in music =

== Events ==
- Luigi Boccherini goes to Madrid as the court chamber music composer to the Infante Don Luis.
- Václav Pichl becomes musical director for Count Ludwig Hartig in Prague
- Charles Burney receives an honorary doctorate in music from the University of Oxford.
- Antonio Maria Gaspare Sacchini arrives in Venice.
- The Concert des Amateurs is founded by François-Joseph Gossec in Paris.
- James Hook is appointed composer to Marylebone Gardens.
- December – 13-year-old Mozart embarks on a tour of Italy with his father, beginning in Verona. In Rome he hears Allegri's Miserere for the first time, returns home and copies it down note for note.

== Opera ==
- Jean-François Cailhava – Les Etrenes de l'amour
- Christoph Willibald von Gluck – Le feste d'Apollo
- André Grétry
  - Lucile
  - Le tableau parlant
- Pierre-Alexandre Monsigny – Le déserteur
- Wolfgang Amadeus Mozart – La finta semplice
- Josef Mysliveček – Demofoonte
- Giovanni Paisiello
  - L’arabo cortese, R.1.22
  - Don Chisciotte della Mancia, R.1.21
- Niccolò Piccinni – Lo sposo burlato

== Classical music ==
- Carl Friedrich Abel – 6 String Quartets, Op. 8
- Johann Albrechtsberger – Concerto for Alto Trombone and Orchestra in B-flat major
- Charles Avison – Six Concertos in Seven Parts, for Four Violins, One Alto Viola, a Violoncello, and a Thorough Bass for the Harpsichord, Op. 10 (London: R. Bremner)
- Carl Philipp Emmanuel Bach
  - Die Israeliten in der Wüste (oratorio), H.775
  - Harpsichord Concerto in E-flat major, H.469
- Luigi Boccherini
  - 6 Violin Sonatas, G. 25–30
  - 6 String Quartets, G. 165–170
- João de Sousa Carvalho – L'Amore Industrioso
- François Joseph Gossec – Sei quartetti per flauto e violino o sia per due violini, alto e basso, op. 14
- Joseph Haydn
  - String Quartets, Op. 9
  - Violin Concerto in G major, Hob. VIIa:4
  - Piano Trio in F major, Hob.XV:2
- Ignaz Holzbauer – 3 Symphonies, Op. 4
- Johann Philipp Kirnberger – Vermischte Musikalien (Berlin: Georg Ludewig Winter)
- Wolfgang Amadeus Mozart
  - Cassation in D major, K. 100/62a
  - Te Deum in C
- Pasquale Pericoli – 6 Cello Sonatas
- Johann Heinrich Rolle – Der Tod Abels (oratorio)
- Johann Baptist Wanhal
  - Symphony in A minor, Bryan a2
  - Quartet for Strings in B-flat major, Op. 2, No. 3
- Johann Adolph Hasse
  - L'Armonica
  - La Gelosia

== Methods and theory writings ==
- François-Joseph Lécuyer – Principes de l'art du chant

== Births ==
- January 2
  - Thomas Haigh, arranger and musician (died 1808)
  - Nannette Streicher, German piano maker, composer, music educator and writer (died 1833)
- January 9 – William Robert Spencer, librettist and poet (died 1834)
- February 12 – Friedrich Rochlitz, music editor and writer (died 1842)
- February 13 – Ivan Krylov, librettist and writer (died 1844)
- February 17 – Johannes Baptista von Albertini, librettist and botanist (died 1831)
- March 7 – Josef Alois Ladurner, Austrian composer and music educator (died 1851)
- March 8 – Katerina Veronika Anna Dusíkova, Bohemian singer, harpist, pianist and composer (died 1833)
- March 25 – Salvatore Viganò, choreographer, dancer and composer (died 1821)
- March 28 – Schack von Staffeldt, librettist and poet (died 1826)
- April 11 – Johann Georg Lickl, organist and composer (died 1843)
- April 25 – Charles Borremans, violinist and conductor (died 1827)
- June 1 – Józef Elsner, composer and music teacher, Chopin's future teacher (died 1854)
- June 5 – Marianne Kirchgessner, German musician (d. 1808)
- June 14 – Domenico Della-Maria Italian and French composer (died 1800)
- July 4 – Louis-Luc Loiseau de Persuis, violinist, conductor and composer (died 1819)
- July 23 – Alexey Nikolayevich Titov, violinist and composer (died 1827)
- July 29 – Louis-Benoît Picard, librettist and writer (died 1769)
- August 14
  - Richard Barry, composer and English rake (died 1793)
  - Friedrich Dülon, flautist (died 1826)
- August 30 – Bonifazio Asioli, Italian composer (died 1832)
- September 8 – Marie-Martin Marcel Marin, composer (died c. 1850)
- September 12 – Reginald Spofforth, organist, conductor and composer (died 1827)
- November 12 – Amelia Opie, librettist and author
- December 26 – Ernst Moritz Arndt, librettist and antisemitic author (died 1860)
- Date unknown –
  - Jean-Jacques Grasset, composer and violinist (died 1839)
  - Charles Hague, composer (died 1821)
  - Daniil Kashin, Russian composer (Died 1841)

== Deaths ==
- January 2 – James Oswald, composer, 57
- February 21 – William Falconer, librettist and writer (born 1732)
- April 3 – Gerhard Tersteegen, librettist and theologian (born 1697)
- June 7 – Antoine-Alexandre-Henri Poinsinet, librettist, drowned (born 1735)
- August 17 – Vasily Trediakovsky, librettist and poet
- September – Henri Hemsch, harpsichord maker, 69
- December 6 – William Felton, composer, 56
- December 13 – Christian Fürchtegott Gellert, librettist and poet (born 1715)
- date unknown – Antonio Palomba, Italian opera librettist, poet, harpsichordist and music educator, 63
