= List of opera genres =

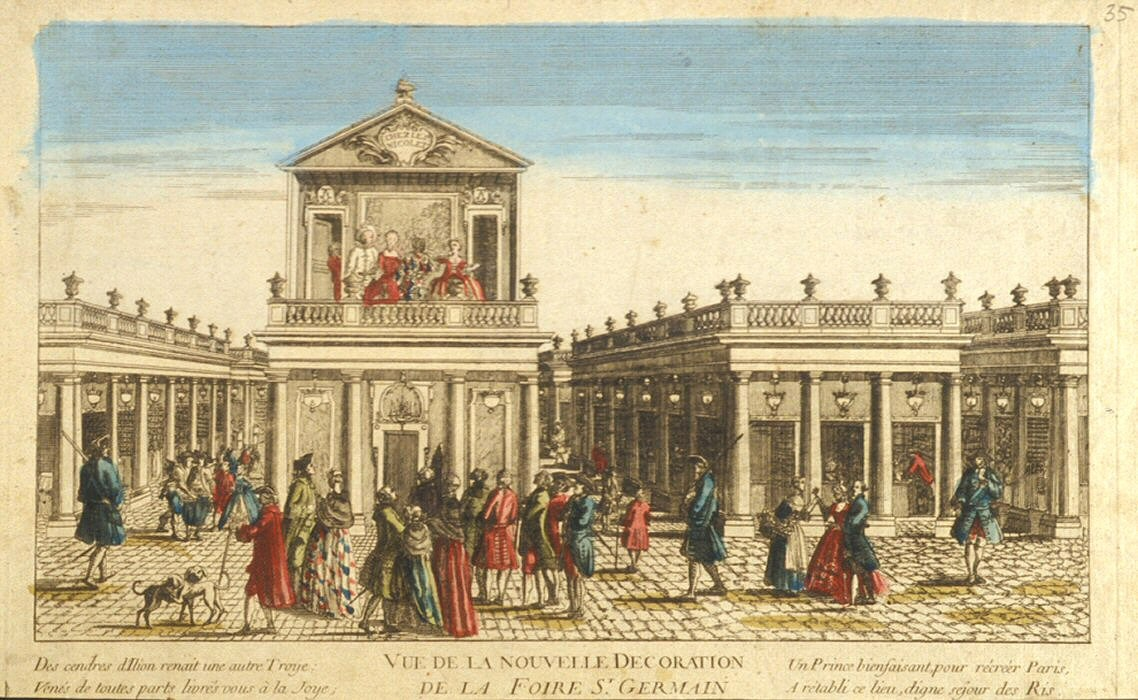
The Paris foire St Germain, c. 1763, after the fire of 1762

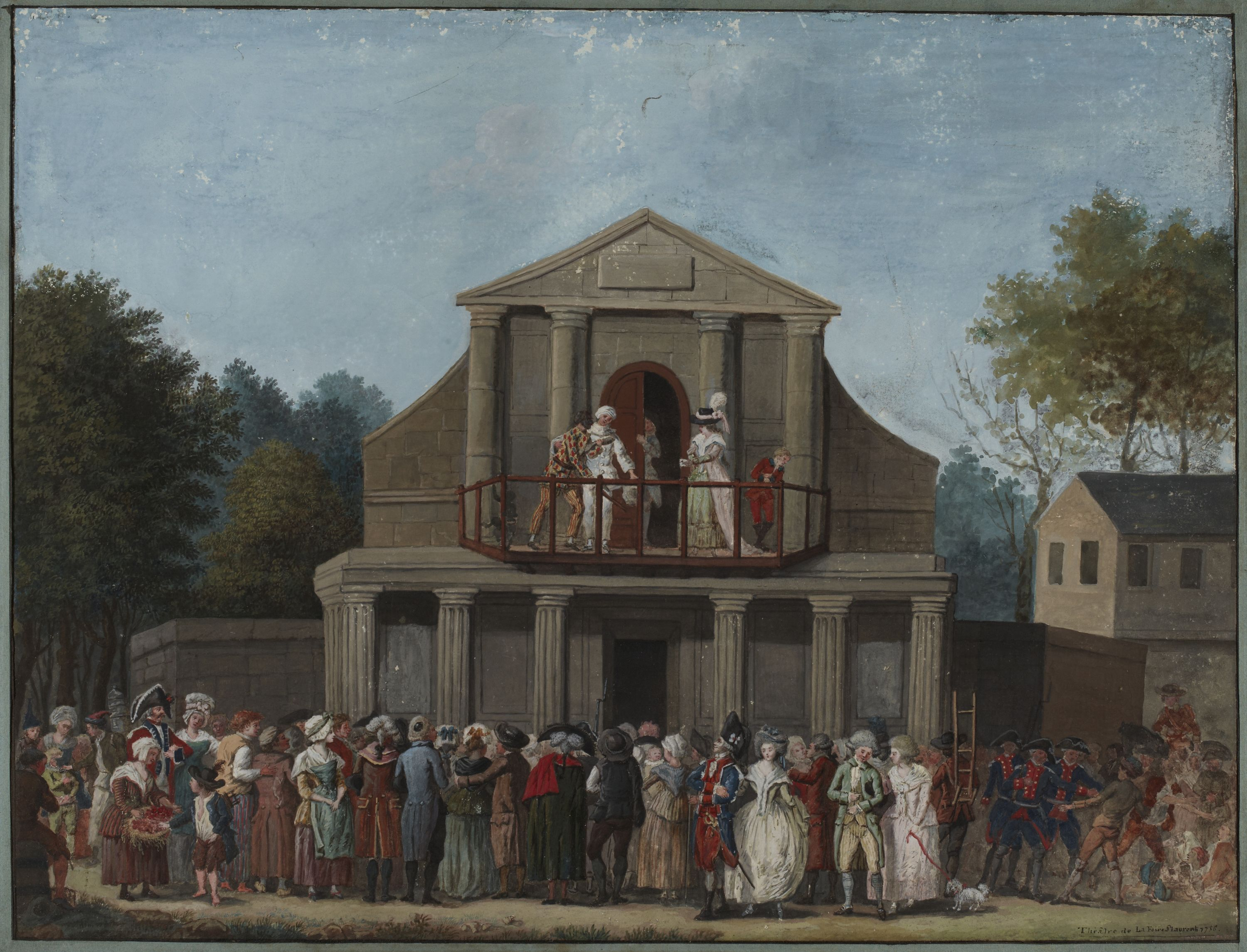
Nicolet's theatre at the foire St Laurent, c. 1786

In the early 18th century, the Théâtre de la foire in Paris – a collective name for the theatres at the annual fairs at St Germain, St Laurent (see illustration above) and later, St Ovide – offered performances with both music and spoken dialogue. First called comédie en vaudeville, these developed into the opéra comique. The Théâtre de la foire appeared in London in the 1720s, to be imitated in the form of the English ballad opera, which in turn stimulated the creation of the German Singspiel.

This is a glossary list of opera genres, giving alternative names.

"Opera" is an Italian word (short for "opera in musica"); it was not at first commonly used in Italy (or in other countries) to refer to the genre of particular works. Most composers used more precise designations to present their work to the public. Often specific genres of opera were commissioned by theatres or patrons (in which case the form of the work might deviate more or less from the genre norm, depending on the inclination of the composer). Opera genres are not exclusive. Some operas are regarded as belonging to several.

== Definitions ==
Opera genres have been defined in different ways, not always in terms of stylistic rules. Some, like opera seria, refer to traditions identified by later historians, and others, like Zeitoper, have been defined by their own inventors. Other forms have been associated with a particular theatre, for example opéra comique at the theatre of the same name, or opéra bouffe at the Théâtre des Bouffes Parisiens.

This list does not include terms that are vague and merely descriptive, such as "comic opera", "sacred opera", "tragic opera" or "one-act opera" etc. Original language terms are given to avoid the ambiguities that would be caused by English translations.

== List ==
Genre	Language	Description	First known example	Major works	Last known example	Notable composers	Refs.
Acte de ballet	French	An opéra ballet consisting of a single entrée. 18th century.		Les fêtes de Ramire (1745), Anacréon (1754),		Rameau	
Afterpiece	English	18th/19th century short opera or pantomime performed after a full-length play.		The Padlock (1768)		Dibdin	
Azione sacra	Italian	Literally, "sacred action". 17th and early 18th century opera with religious subject. Performed at Vienna court.		L'humanità redenta (Draghi, 1669)		Draghi, Bertali, Pietro Andrea Ziani, Giovanni Battista Pederzuoli, Cesti	
Azione sepolcrale	Italian	alternative name for azione sacra					
Azione scenica	Italian	alternative name for azione teatrale			Al gran sole carico d'amore (1975)		
Azione teatrale (plural azioni teatrali)	Italian	Small-scale one-act opera, or musical play. Early form of chamber opera. Popular in late 17th and 18th centuries. (See also festa teatrale, a similar genre but on a larger scale.)		Le cinesi (1754), Il sogno di Scipione (1772), L'isola disabitata (1779)		Bonno, Gluck, Mozart, Haydn	
Ballad opera	English	Entertainment originating in 18th-century London as a reaction against Italian opera. Early examples used existing popular ballad tunes set to satirical texts. Also popular in Dublin and America, Influenced the German Singspiel, and subsequently 20th-century opera.	The Beggar's Opera (1728)	Love in a Village (1762), Hugh the Drover (1924), The Threepenny Opera (1928)		Pepusch, Coffey, Arne, Weill	
Ballet héroïque	French	Literally 'heroic ballet'. A type of opéra ballet featuring the heroic and exotic, of the early/mid 18th century.	Les festes grecques et romaines (Colin de Blamont, 1723)	Zaïde, reine de Grenade (1739), Les fêtes de Paphos (1758)		Royer, Mondonville, Mion	
Bühnenfestspiel	German	Literally, "stage festival play". Wagner's description of the four operas of Der Ring des Nibelungen				Wagner	
Bühnenweihfestspiel	German	Literally, "stage consecration festival play". Wagner's description for Parsifal				Wagner	
Burla	Italian	alternative name for burletta					
Burletta	Italian	Literally, "little joke". Informal term for comic pieces in the 18th century. Used in England for intermezzos and light, satirical works.		The Recruiting Serjeant (1770)		Dibdin	
Burletta per musica	Italian	alternative name for burletta		Il vero originale (Mayr 1808)			
Burlettina	Italian	alternative name for burletta					
Characterposse	German	Specialized form of Posse mit Gesang concentrating on personalities.					
Comédie en vaudeville	French	Entertainment in Paris fair theatres at the end of the 17th century, mixing popular vaudeville songs with comedy. In the 18th century, developed into the opéra comique, while influencing directly the English ballad opera and indirectly the German Singspiel.					
Comédie lyrique	French	Literally, "lyric comedy". 18th century: description used by Rameau. 19th century: alternative name for opéra lyrique.		Platée (1745), Les Paladins (1760)		Rameau	
Comédie mêlée d'ariettes	French	Literally, "comedy mixed with brief arias". An early form of French opéra comique dating to the mid 18th century.		La rencontre imprévue (1764), Tom Jones (1765), Le déserteur (1769), Zémire et Azor (1771), Le congrès des rois (Cherubini et al., 1794)		Gluck, Grétry	
Commedia	Italian	abbreviation of commedia in musica		Il barbiere di Siviglia (1816)			
Commedia in musica	Italian	alternative name for opera buffa					
Commedia per musica	Italian	alternative name for opera buffa		La pastorella nobile (1788)			
Componimento da camera	Italian	alternative name for azione teatrale					
Componimento drammatico	Italian	alternative name for azione teatrale					
Componimento pastorale	Italian	alternative name for azione teatrale		La danza (Gluck, 1755)		Gluck	
Conte lyrique	French	alternative name for opéra lyrique		Grisélidis (Massenet, 1901)			
Divertimento giocoso	Italian	alternative name for opera buffa					
Dramatic (or dramatick) opera	English	alternative name for semi-opera					
Drame forain	French	alternative name for Comédie en vaudeville					
Drame lyrique	French	Literally, "lyric drama". (1) Term used in the 18th century. (2) Reinvented in the late 19th/early 20th century to describe opera that developed out of opéra comique, influenced by Massenet.		Echo et Narcisse (1779), La marquise de Brinvilliers (1831), Werther (1892), Briséïs (1897), Messidor (1897)		Gluck, Chabrier, Bruneau, Erlanger	
Dramma bernesco	Italian	alternative name for opera buffa					
Dramma comico	Italian	alternative name for opera buffa, 18th/early 19th century. Also used for the genre that replaced it from mid 19th century, with the elimination of recitatives.					
Dramma comico per musica	Italian	alternative name for dramma comico					
Dramma di sentimento	Italian	alternative name for opera semiseria					
Dramma eroicomico	Italian	Literally "heroic-comic drama". A late 18th century opera buffa with some heroic content.		Orlando paladino (1782), Palmira, regina di Persia (1795)		Haydn, Salieri	
Dramma giocoso (plural drammi giocosi)	Italian	Literally, "jocular drama". Mid 18th century form that developed out of the opera buffa, marked by the addition of serious, even tragic roles and situations to the comic ones. (Effectively a subgenre of opera buffa in the 18th century.)		La scuola de' gelosi (1778), La vera costanza (1779), Il viaggio a Reims (1825),		Haydn, Mozart, Salieri, Sarti, Rossini, Donizetti	
Dramma giocoso per musica	Italian	full term for dramma giocoso					
Dramma pastorale	Italian	Literally, "pastoral drama". Used for some of the earliest operas down to the 18th century.		Eumelio (Agazzari, 1606), La fede riconosciuta (A Scarlatti, 1710)		A Scarlatti, Sarti	
Dramma per musica (plural drammi per musica)	Italian	Literally, "drama for music", or "a play intended to be set to music" (i.e. a libretto). Later, synonymous with opera seria and dramma serio per musica; in the 19th century, sometimes used for serious opera.		Erismena (1656), Tito Manlio (1719), Paride ed Elena (1770), Idomeneo (1781), Rossini's Otello (1816)		A Scarlatti, Cavalli, Vivaldi, Sarti, Gluck, Mozart	
Dramma semiserio	Italian	alternative name for opera semiseria		Torvaldo e Dorliska (1815)			
Dramma tragicomico	Italian	alternative name for opera semiseria.		Axur, re d'Ormus (1787)			
Entr'acte	French	French name for intermezzo					
Episode lyrique	French	alternative name for opéra lyrique					
Fait historique	French	Late 18th/19th century. Opéra or opéra comique based on French history, especially popular during the French Revolution.	L'incendie du Havre (1786)	Joseph Barra (Grétry 1794), Le pont de Lody (Méhul 1797), Milton (1804)		Grétry, Méhul, Spontini	
Farsa (plural farse)	Italian	Literally, "farce". A form of one-act opera, sometimes with dancing, associated with Venice, especially the Teatro San Moisè, in the late 18th and early 19th centuries.		La cambiale di matrimonio (1810), L'inganno felice (1812), La scala di seta (1812), Il signor Bruschino (1813), Adina (1818)		Rossini	
Farsetta	Italian	alternative name for farsa					
Feenmärchen	German	alternative name for Märchenoper					
Favola in musica	Italian	Earliest form of opera	Dafne (1598)	L'Orfeo (1607)		Monteverdi	
Festa teatrale	Italian	A grander version of the azione teatrale. An opera given as part of a court celebration (of a marriage etc.) Typically associated with Vienna.	Il pomo d'oro (Cesti, 1668)			Draghi, Fux, Caldara	
Geistliche Oper	German	Literally, "sacred opera". Genre invented by the Russian composer Anton Rubinstein for his German-language, staged opera-oratorios.	Das verlorene Paradies (Rubinstein, 1856)	Der Thurm zu Babel (1870), Sulamith (1883), Moses (1894)	Christus (Rubinstein, 1895)	Rubinstein	
Género chico	Spanish	Literally, "little genre". A type of zarzuela, differing from zarzuela grande by its brevity and popular appeal.				Ruperto Chapí	
Género grande	Spanish	alternative name for zarzuela grande					
Grand opéra	French	19th-century genre, usually with 4 or 5 acts, large-scale casts and orchestras, and spectacular staging, often based on historical themes. Particularly associated with the Paris Opéra (1820s to c. 1850), but similar works were created in other countries.	La muette de Portici (1828)	Robert le diable (1831), La Juive (1835), Les Huguenots (1836)	Patrie! (Paladilhe, 1886)	Meyerbeer, Halévy, Verdi	
Handlung	German	Literally "action" or "drama". Wagner's description for Tristan und Isolde.				Wagner	
Intermezzo	Italian	Comic relief inserted between acts of opere serie in the early 18th century, typically involving slapstick, disguises etc. Spread throughout Europe In the 1730s. Predated Opera buffa.	Frappolone e Florinetta (Gasparini?, 1706)	La serva padrona (1733)		Pergolesi, Hasse	
Liederspiel	German	Literally "song-play". Early 19th century genre in which existing lyrics, often well-known, were set to new music and inserted into a spoken play.	Lieb' und Treue (Reichardt, 1800)	Kunst und Liebe (Reichardt, 1807)		Reichardt Lindpaintner	
Lokalposse	German	Specialized form of Posse mit Gesang concentrating on daily life themes, associated with the playwright Karl von Marinelli.					
Märchenoper	German	"Fairy-tale opera", a genre of 19th century opera usually with a supernatural theme. Similar to Zauberoper.		Hänsel und Gretel (1893)		Humperdinck, Siegfried Wagner	
Märchenspiel	German	alternative name for Märchenoper					
Melodramma	Italian	19th century. General term for opera sometimes used instead of more specific genres.					
Melodramma serio	Italian	alternative name for opera seria					
Musikdrama	German	Term associated with the later operas of Wagner but repudiated by him. Nevertheless, widely used by post-Wagnerian composers.		Tiefland (1903), Salome (1905), Der Golem (d'Albert 1926)		d'Albert, Richard Strauss	
Opéra	French	Referring to individual works: 1. 18th century. Occasionally used for operas outside specific, standard genres. 2. 19th/20th century: an opéra is a "French lyric stage work sung throughout" in contrast to an opéra comique that mixed singing with spoken dialogue. Opéra (which included grand opéra), was associated with the Paris Opéra (the Opéra). Also used for some works with a serious tone at the Opéra-Comique.		Naïs (1749), Fernand Cortez (1809), Moïse et Pharaon (1827), Les vêpres siciliennes (1855), Roméo et Juliette (1867)		Grétry, Spontini, Rossini, Verdi, Gounod	
Opéra-ballet	French	Genre with more dancing than tragédie en musique. Usually with a prologue and a number of self-contained acts (called entrées), following a theme.	L'Europe galante (1697)	Les élémens (1721), Les Indes galantes (1735), Les fêtes d'Hébé (1739)		Destouches, Rameau	
Opera ballo	Italian	19th-century Italian grand opéra.		Il Guarany (1870), Aida (1871), La Gioconda (opera) (1876)		Gomes, Verdi, Ponchielli	
Opera buffa (plural, opere buffe)	Italian	Major genre of comic opera in the 18th and early 19th centuries. Originating in Naples (especially the Teatro dei Fiorentini), its popularity spread during the 1730s, notably to Venice where development was influenced by the playwright/librettist Goldoni. Typically in three acts, unlike the intermezzo. Contrasting in style, subject matter, and the use of dialect with the formal, aristocratic opera seria.	La Cilla (Michelangelo Faggioli, 1706)	Li zite 'ngalera (1722), Il filosofo di campagna (Galuppi, 1754), La buona figliuola (1760), Le nozze di Figaro (1786), Il barbiere di Siviglia (1816), Don Pasquale (1843), Crispino e la comare (1850)	Don Procopio (1859)	Vinci, Pergolesi, Galuppi, Duni, Piccinni, Sacchini, Salieri, Mozart, Rossini	
Opéra bouffe (plural, opéras bouffes)	French	Comic genre of opérette including satire, parody and farce. Closely connected with Offenbach and the Théâtre des Bouffes-Parisiens where most of them were produced.	Orphée aux enfers (1858)	La belle Hélène (1864), La Grande-Duchesse de Gérolstein (1867), La Périchole (1868)	Les mamelles de Tirésias (1947)	Offenbach, Hervé, Lecocq	
Opéra bouffon	French	Opera buffa as performed in 18th-century France, either in the original language or in translation. (Sometimes confused with opéra comique.)		Le roi Théodore à Venise (Paisiello, 1786)			
Opéra comique (plural, opéras comiques)	French	Literally, 'comic opera'. Genre including arias, a certain amount of spoken dialogue (and sometimes recitatives). Closely associated with works written for the Paris Opéra-Comique. Themes included were serious and tragic, as well as light. Tradition developed from popular early 18th century comédies en vaudevilles and lasted into 20th century with many changes in style.	Télémaque (Jean-Claude Gillier, 1715)	Les troqueurs (1753), La dame blanche (1825), Carmen (1875), Lakmé (1883)		Philidor, Monsigny, Grétry, Boieldieu, Auber,	
Opéra comique en vaudeville	French	alternative name for comédie en vaudeville					
Opera eroica	Italian	17th/18th/19th century genre which translates as "heroic opera". It mixed serious and romantic drama with improvised comedy.		Enrico di Borgogna (1818)			
Opéra féerie (plural, opéras féeries)	French	18th/19th century genre of works based on fairy tales, often involving magic.		Zémire et Azor (1771), Cendrillon (1810), La belle au bois dormant (1825)		Carafa, Isouard	
Opéra lyrique	French	Literally, "lyric opera". Late 18th/19th century, less grandiose than grand opéra, but without the spoken dialogue of opéra comique. (Term applied more to the genre as a whole than individual operas.)				Gounod, Ambroise Thomas, Massenet	
Opera-oratorio				Oedipe roi (1927), Jeanne d'Arc au bûcher (1938)		Milhaud, Honegger, Stravinsky	
Opera semiseria	Italian	Literally, "semi-serious opera". Early/mid 19th century genre employing comedy but also, unlike opera buffa, pathos, often with a pastoral setting. Typically included a basso buffo role.	Camilla (Paer, 1799)	La gazza ladra (1817), Linda di Chamounix (1842)	Violetta (Mercadante, 1853)	Paer, Rossini, Donizetti	
Opera seria (plural, opere serie)	Italian	Literally, "serious opera". Dominant style of opera in the 18th century, not only in Italy but throughout Europe (except France). Rigorously formal works using texts, mainly based on ancient history, by poet-librettists led by Metastasio. Patronized by the court and the nobility. Star singers were often castrati.		Griselda (1721), Cleofide (Hasse, 1731), Ariodante (1735), Alceste (1767), La clemenza di Tito (1791)		Alessandro Scarlatti, Vivaldi, Hasse, Handel, Gluck, Mozart	
Opéra-tragédie	French	alternative name for tragédie en musique					
Operetta	English (from Italian)	Literally, "little opera". Derived from English versions of Offenbach's opéras bouffes performed in London in the 1860s. Some of the earliest native operettas in English were written by Frederic Clay and Sullivan. (W. S. Gilbert and Sullivan wished to distinguish their joint works from continental operetta and later called them "comic operas" or Savoy operas).	Cox and Box (1866)	Princess Toto (1876), Rip Van Winkle (1882), Naughty Marietta (1910), Monsieur Beaucaire (1919), The Student Prince (1924), The Vagabond King (1925)	Candide (1956)	Sullivan, Herbert, Romberg, Friml, Leonard Bernstein	
Opérette (plural, opérettes)	French	French operetta. Original genre of light (both of music and subject matter) opera that grew out of the French opéra comique in the mid 19th century. Associated with the style of the Second Empire by the works of Offenbach, though his best-known examples are designated subgenerically as opéras bouffes.	L'ours et le pacha (Hervé, 1842)	Madame Papillon (Offenbach, 1855), Les mousquetaires au couvent (1880), Les p'tites Michu (1897), Ciboulette (1923)		Hervé, Offenbach, Varney, Messager, Hahn	
Opérette bouffe	French	Subgenre of French opérette.		La bonne d'enfant (1856), M. Choufleuri restera chez lui le . . . (1861)		Offenbach	
Opérette vaudeville (or vaudeville opérette)	French	Subgenre of French opérette.	L'ours et le pacha (Hervé, 1842)	Mam'zelle Nitouche (1883)		Hervé, Victor Roger	
Operette (plural, operetten)	German	German operetta. Popular Viennese genre during the 19th and 20th centuries, created under the influence of Offenbach and spread to Berlin, Budapest, and other German and east European cities.	Das Pensionat (Suppé, 1860)	Die Fledermaus (1874), The Merry Widow (1905), Das Land des Lächelns (1929)	Frühjahrsparade (Robert Stolz, 1964)	Johann Strauss II, Lehár, Oscar Straus	
Pasticcio	Italian	Literally "a pie" or a hotchpotch. An adaptation or localization of an existing work that is loose, unauthorized, or inauthentic. Also used for a single work by a number of different composers, particularly in early 18th-century London.		Thomyris (Pepusch, Bononcini, Scarlatti, Gasparini, Albinoni, 1707) Muzio Scevola (1721), Ivanhoé (1826)		Handel, Vivaldi	
Pièce lyrique	French	alternative name for opéra lyrique					
Pastorale héroïque	French	Type of ballet héroïque (opéra-ballet). Usually in three acts with an allegorical prologue, that typically drew on classical themes associated with pastoral poetry.	Acis et Galatée (1686)	Issé (1697), Zaïs (1748), Naïs (1749)		Lully, Rameau	
Posse	German	alternative name for Posse mit Gesang					
Posse mit Gesang (plural Possen mit Gesang)	German	Literally, "farce with singing". Popular entertainment of late 18th/early 19th centuries, associated with Vienna, Berlin and Hamburg. Similar to the Singspiel, but with more action and less music. Re-invented in the early 20th century by Walter Kollo and others.		Der Alpenkönig und der Menschenfeind (Raimund, 1828), Filmzauber (1912)		Kreutzer, Müller, Schubert, Walter Kollo	
Possenspiel	German	early name for Posse mit Gesang					
Possenspil	German	early name for Posse mit Gesang					
Radio opera	English	Works written specifically for the medium of radio.	The Red Pen (1925)	The Willow Tree (Cadman, 1932), Die schwarze Spinne (Sutermeister, 1936), Comedy on the Bridge (1937), The Old Maid and the Thief (1939), Il prigioniero (1949), I due timidi (1950)		Martinů, Sutermeister, Menotti, Dallapiccola, Rota	
Rappresentazione sacra	Italian	alternative name for azione sacra					
Rescue opera	French	Early nineteenth century transitional genre between opéra comique, Romantic opera, and grand opera, featuring the rescue of a main character; called opéra à sauvetage in French, and Rettunsoper or Befreiungsoper in German (also Schrekensoper)	Les rigueurs du cloître (Henri Montan Berton, 1790) or Lodoïska (1791); some antecedents whose inclusion in the genre is debated	Fidelio, Lodoïska, Les deux journées	Dalibor (1868)	Cherubini, Dalayrac, Le Sueur	
Romantische Oper	German	Early 19th-century German genre derived from earlier French opéras comiques, dealing with "German" themes of nature, the supernatural, folklore etc. Spoken dialogue, originally included with musical numbers, was eventually eliminated in works by Richard Wagner.	Silvana (1810)	Der Freischütz (1821), Hans Heiling (1833), Undine (1845), Tannhäuser (1845)	Lohengrin (1850)	Weber, Marschner, Lortzing, Wagner	
Sainete	Spanish	Literally, "farce" or "titbit". 17th/18th century genre of comic opera similar to the Italian intermezzo, performed together with larger works. Popular in Madrid in the latter 18th century. During the 19th century, the Sainete was synonymous with género chico.	Il mago (1632)			Pablo Esteve, Soler, Antonio Rosales	
Sainetillo	Spanish	Diminutive of sainete					
Savoy opera	English	19th-century form of operetta (sometimes referred to as a form of "comic opera" to distance the English genre from the continental) comprising the works of Gilbert and Sullivan and other works from 1877 to 1903 that played at the Opera Comique and then the Savoy Theatre in London. These influenced the rise of musical theatre.	Trial by Jury (1875)	H.M.S. Pinafore (1878), The Pirates of Penzance (1880), The Mikado (1885), The Gondoliers (1889), Merrie England (1902)	A Princess of Kensington (1903)	Sullivan, Solomon, German	
Saynète	French	French for sainete. Description used for a particular style of opérette in the 19th century.		La caravane de l'amour (Hervé, 1854), Le rêve d'une nuit d'été (Offenbach, 1855), Le valet de coeur (Planquette, 1875)		Hervé, Offenbach, Planquette	
Schauspiel mit Gesang	German	Literally, "play with singing". Term used by Goethe for his early libretti, though he called them Singspiele when revising them.	Erwin und Elmire (Goethe 1775)	Liebe nur beglückt (Reichardt, 1781), Die Teufels Mühle am Wienerberg (Müller 1799)			
Schuloper	German	Literally, "school opera". Early 20th century, opera created for performance by school children.		Der Jasager (1930), Wir bauen eine Stadt (Hindemith, 1930)		Weill, Hindemith	
Semi-opera	English	Early form of opera with singing, speaking and dancing roles. Popular between 1673 and 1710.	The Tempest (Betterton, 1674)	Psyche (1675), King Arthur (1691), The Fairy-Queen (1692)		Purcell	
Sepolcro	Italian	Azione sacra on the subject of the passion and crucifixion of Christ.				Draghi	
Serenata	Italian	Literally, "evening song". Short opera performed at court for celebrations, similar to the azione teatrale. (Also used to refer to serenades.)		Acis and Galatea (1720), Il Parnaso confuso (Gluck 1765)		Handel, Gluck	
Singspiel (plural Singspiele)	German	Literally, "sing play". Popular genre of the 18th/19th centuries, (though the term is also found as early as the 16th century). Derived originally from translations of English ballad operas, but also influenced by French opéra comique. Spoken dialogue, combined with ensembles, folk-coloured ballads and arias. Originally performed by traveling troupes. Plots generally comic or romantic, often including magic. Developed into German "rescue opera" and romantische Oper.	Der Teufel ist los (Johann Georg Standfuss, 1752)	Die verwandelten Weiber (1766), Die Jagd (1770), Die Entführung aus dem Serail (1782), Abu Hassan (1811)		Hiller, Mozart, Weber	
Situationsposse	German	Specialized form of Posse mit Gesang concentrating on social situations.					
Songspiel	German	Literally, "song play" ("Song" being the English word as used in German, e.g. by Brecht, etc.) Term invented by Kurt Weill to update the concept of Singspiel		Mahagonny-Songspiel (1927)		Kurt Weill	
Spieloper	German	Literally, "opera play". 19th-century light opera genre, derived from Singspiel and to a lesser extent opéra comique, containing spoken dialogue. Spieltenor and Spielbass are specialized voice types connected with the genre.		Zar und Zimmermann (1837), The Merry Wives of Windsor (1849)		Lortzing, Nicolai	
Syngespil	Danish	Local form of Singspiel. Late 18th/19th century.		Soliman den Anden (Sarti, 1770), Holger Danske (1787), Høstgildet (Schulz, 1790)		Sarti, Schulz, Kunzen	
Television opera	English	Works written specifically for the medium of television.	Amahl and the Night Visitors (1951)	The Marriage (1953), Owen Wingrave (1971), Man on the Moon (2006)		Menotti, Martinů, Sutermeister, Britten	
Tonadilla	Spanish	Literally, "little tune". 18th century miniature satirical genre, for one or more singer, that developed out of the sainete. Performed in between longer works.		La mesonera y el arriero (Luis Misón, 1757)		Antonio Guerrero, Misón, José Palomino	
Tragédie	French	alternative name for tragédie en musique					
Tragédie en musique	French	17th/18th century lyric genre with themes from Classical mythology and the Italian epics of Tasso and Ariosto, not necessarily with tragic outcomes. Usually 5 acts, sometimes with a prologue. Short arias (petits airs) contrast with dialogue in recitative, with choral sections and dancing.	Cadmus et Hermione (1673)	Médée (1693), Scylla et Glaucus (1746)		Lully, Marais, Montéclair, Campra, Rameau	
Tragédie lyrique	French	alternative name for tragédie en musique					
Tragédie mise en musique	French	alternative name for tragédie en musique					
Tragédie-opéra	French	alternative name for tragédie en musique					
Verismo	Italian	Late 19th/early 20th century opera movement inspired by literary naturalism and realism, and associated with Italian post-romanticism.	Cavalleria rusticana (1890)	Pagliacci (1892), Tosca (1900)		Mascagni, Leoncavallo, Puccini, Giordano	
Volksmärchen	German	alternative name for Märchenoper.		Das Donauweibchen (Kauer 1798)			
Zarzuela	Spanish	Dating back to the 17th century and forward to the present day, this form includes both singing and spoken dialogue, also dance. Local traditions are also found in Cuba and the Philippines.	El Laurel de Apolo (Juan Hidalgo de Polanco, 1657)	Doña Francisquita (1923), La dolorosa (1930), Luisa Fernanda (1932)		Hidalgo, Barbieri	
Zauberoper	German	Literally, "magic opera". Late 18th and early 19th centuries, particularly associated with Vienna. Heavier, more formal work than Zauberposse, but also with spoken dialogue.	Oberon, König der Elfen (Wranitzky, 1789)	Die Zauberflöte (1791), Das Donauweibchen, (Kauer, 1798)		Kauer, Müller, Schubert	
Zauberposse	German	Specialized form of Posse mit Gesang concentrating on magic.		Der Barometermacher auf der Zauberinsel (Müller 1823)		Müller	
Zeitoper (plural Zeitopern)	German	Literally, "opera of the times". 1920s, early 1930s genre, using contemporary settings and characters, including references to modern technology and popular music.		Jonny spielt auf (1927), Neues vom Tage (1929)		Krenek, Weill, Hindemith	
Zwischenspiel	German	German name for intermezzo		Pimpinone (1725)			

== See also ==
- Operas by genre

The following cover other forms of entertainment that existed around the time of the appearance of the first operas in Italy at the end of the 16th century, which were influential in the development of the art form:

- Intermedio
- Masque
- Madrigale concertato
- Madrigal comedy
