= Tom Jones (Philidor) =

1765 opéra comique by François-André Danican Philidor

- Opéra comique by François-André Danican Philidor
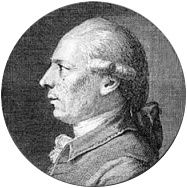
- Portrait of Philidor, London, 1777
- Librettist: Antoine-Alexandre-Henri Poisenet; Bertin Davesne
- Language: French
- Based on: Henry Fielding's The History of Tom Jones, a Foundling
- Premiere: 27 February 1765; Comédie-Italienne, Paris

Tom Jones is a comédie mêlée d'ariettes, a kind of opéra comique, by the French composer and chess champion François-André Danican Philidor which first appeared at the Comédie-Italienne, Paris, on 27 February 1765. Its French libretto, by Antoine-Alexandre-Henri Poisenet and Bertin Davesne, is loosely based on the 1749 novel by Henry Fielding.

== Performance history ==
The opera was initially a failure but Philidor had the libretto revised by Michel-Jean Sedaine and this new version, first performed on 30 January 1766, proved one of the most popular opéras comiques of the late 18th century. It was produced in a number of other countries, and translated into German, Swedish and Russian.

In an edition by Nicholas McGegan (which involved the substitution of a couple of arias with numbers from other Philidor operas) the work was performed at Cambridge Arts Theatre by Cambridge University Opera Society conducted by McGegan in October 1971. Another modern revival took place at the Opéra-Comique in 1979 with Suzanne Sarroca, Charles Burles and Jean-Philippe Lafont in the cast.

At Drottningholm in Stockholm, the work had initially been played in French but was subsequently done in Swedish; in 1995 it was produced in a "sit-com-ish English version" although the music was "safe in the hands of Nicholas McGegan conducting his own edition and eliciting sprightly, neatly balanced playing from the orchestra". The cast included Greg Fedderly in the title role, Judith Howarth as Sophia, Sarah Walker as "a lorgnette-wielding, Lady-Bracknell-inflected Miss Western", Brian Burrows as Squire Western and Ann Archibald "an arch Mrs Honour".

== Roles ==
Roles, voice types, premiere cast
Role	Voice type	Premiere cast, 27 February 1765
Monsieur Western	bass	Joseph Caillot
Madame Western, his sister	mezzo-soprano	Bérard
Sophie, his daughter	soprano	Desglands
Honora, her companion	soprano	Marie-Thérèse Laruette-Villette
Alworthy, their neighbour	tenor	Antoine Trial
Tom Jones, his ward	tenor	Clairval (Jean-Baptiste Guignard)
Blifil, Alworthy's nephew	tenor	Jean-Louis Laruette
Quaker Dowling	spoken	

== Synopsis ==
=== Act 1 ===
Sophie confides in her friend Honora her love for Tom Jones, the adopted nephew of their neighbour Alworthy. Honora reveals how she has discovered Jones's love for Sophie. Mme Western intervenes just as Western and Jones return from a hunt, which Western describes energetically. Alone with her brother, Mme Western declares that Sophie wishes to wed Blifil, Alworthy's nephew. Western accepts the new son-in-law and urges Alworthy to fetch him. Mme Western tells Sophie that her father has consented to the marriage, and Sophie joyfully gives thanks that Tom has been accepted. Mme Western realizes her mistake and leaves in high dudgeon.

=== Act 2 ===
Blifil arrives at Western's house and meets Dowling, a quaker, Western's notary. Dowling, before leaving for London, seeks information on a letter which Blifil should have disclosed to him. Next, Jones meets Blifil, who turns his back. Alone, Tom sings of his love for Sophie. Enter Western, who in confidence announces the marriage of Sophie and Blifil. The latter meet, after which Sophie expresses her dislike of Blifil to her father. Western reacts violently and he charges Jones with making his daughter see reason. They are caught in the throes of expressing their sentiments by members of the household and the foundling is thrown out by the Westerns, rejected by Alworthy, cursed by Blifil, but supported by Honora and Sophie.

=== Act 3 ===
At a tavern on the London road Jones finds Dowling and pours out his woes. The notary calms him and determines to intervene. Next the landlady welcomes Sophie and Honora who have gone after Tom. Alone, Sophie sings of her fears, love and hopes. Honora comes back followed by two drunkards. Tom runs to their aid and a swift duel ensues. No sooner are Tom and Sophie reunited than Western rushes in ready to do anything to get his daughter back. He is followed by Alworthy, to whom Dowling reveals that Jones is older than Blifil and therefore his nephew, the letter hidden by Blifil proving it. Western finally consents to the marriage of Sophie and Tom.

== Music ==
Philidor’s musical language is according to Rodney Milnes "more ‘learned’, less naive than Grétry’s though no less enchanting, with contrapuntal interest in plenty and many a harmonic surprise". He also praises the elaborate second-act finale in Tom Jones as "truly Mozartian". He notes Philidor’s setting of dialogue in set numbers, and "his knack of ensuring that arias never hold up, rather nudge forward the action". In the act one duo for Sophie and Honora the two characters are differentiated in terms of melody and rhythm; Grétry declared that Philidor was the first to have such devices in concerted numbers - Tom Jones also has one of the first unaccompanied vocal quartets to appear in opera. For Caillot, one of the stars of the Comédie-Italienne, Philidor wrote a striking hunting air in the first act, while Sophie sings her first solo with oboe and bassoon. The valse-septet in the finale of act 3 is the culminating high-point in the score; Sophie and Tom plead for their union, and five other characters comment separately on the intended marriage.

== Recordings ==
François-André Danican Philidor: Tom Jones, Lausanne Opera and Le Sinfonietta de Lausanne

- Conductor: Jean-Claude Malgoire
- Principal singers: Sébastien Droy, Sophie Marin-Degor, Marc Barrard, Sibyl Zanganelli, Carine Séchehaye, Rodolphe Briand, Léonard Pezzino and Guillaume Michel
- Recording date: staged in 2005; recorded on 17, 18 and 20 January 2006
- Label: Dynamic 33509 (DVD), CDS509 (CD)
