= Lucile (opera) =

Opera in one act by André Grétry

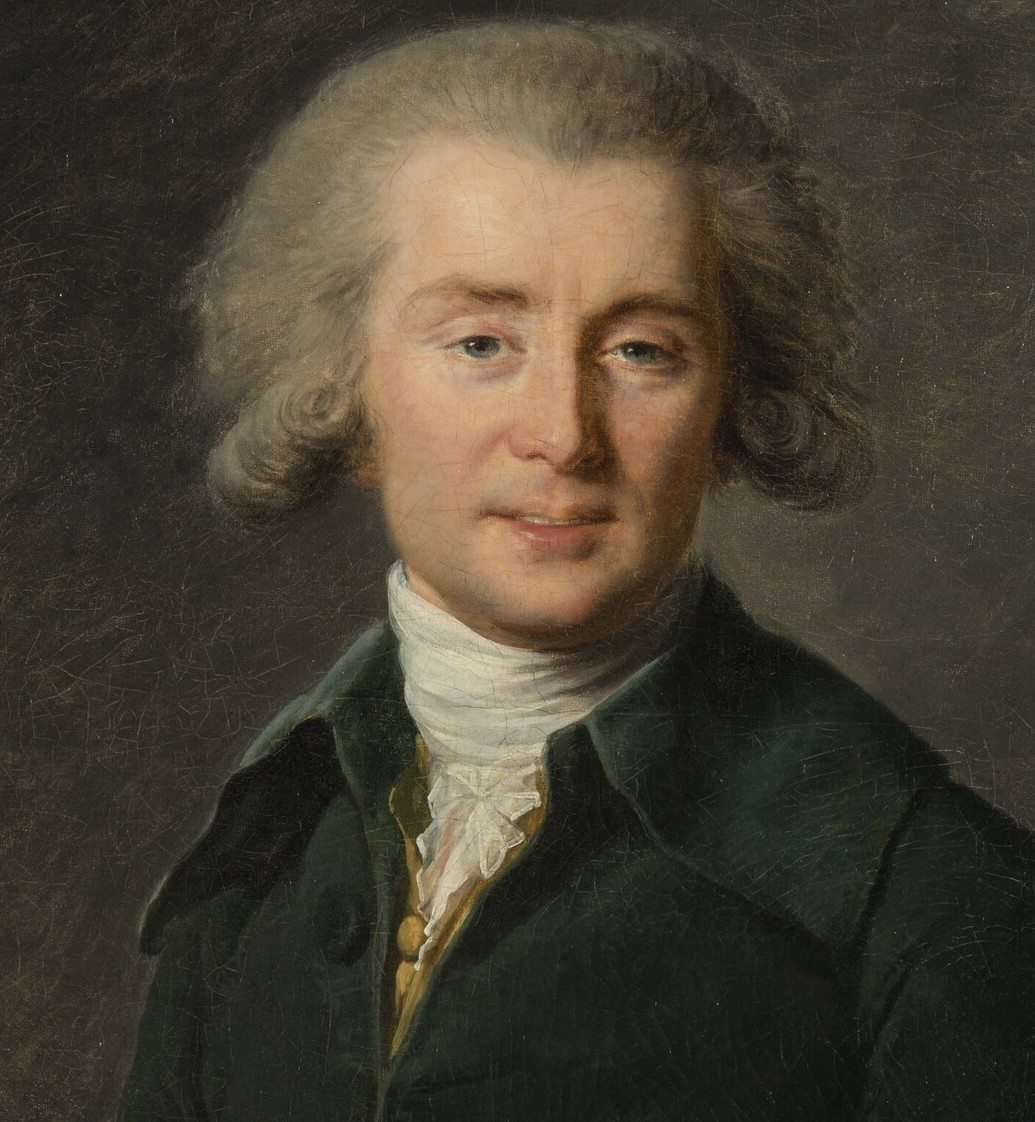
André Grétry

Lucile is an opéra comique, described as a comédie mêlée d'ariettes, in one act by the composer André Grétry, It was first performed at the Comédie-Italienne, Paris on 5 January 1769. The French text is by Jean-François Marmontel, and the characters in the opera, though not the actual story, were derived from "L'école des pères", one of Marmontel's Contes moraux ("Moral Tales"). The melody from "Où peut-on être mieux qu'au sein de sa famille?" was later reused in Vieuxtemps' Violin Concerto No. 5, Op.37.

== Performance history ==
Lucile was first performed at the Comédie-Italienne, Paris on 5 January 1769 and became Grétry's most popular opera during the following decade. By 1780 it had reached a total of 195 performances but it was less successful thereafter.

== Roles ==
Role	Voice type	Premiere Cast, January 5, 1769 (Conductor: - )
Blaise	baritone	Joseph "Giuseppe" Caillot
Dorval	tenor	Clairval
Dorval père	basse-taille (bass-baritone)	Nainville
Julie	soprano	Eulalie Des Glan(d)s
Lucile	soprano	Marie-Thérèse Laruette
Timante	tenor	Jean-Louis Laruette

== Synopsis ==
Lucile is enjoying a morning preparing for her wedding. She is joined by her fiancé young Dorval, her father Timante and Dorval's father. The celebrations are interrupted by the old peasant Blaise, who reveals that his wife has just confided a secret to him on her deathbed: she had been a wet nurse to Timante's child, but when the baby died she decided to hide the truth and exchange it for her own daughter to ensure a better future for the latter. The grown-up child is Lucile. Lucile's poor background means she can no longer marry the middle-class Dorval. However, Timante persuades Dorval's father to let the wedding go ahead regardless and the opera concludes with general rejoicing.

== Adaptations ==
"Où peut-on être mieux qu'au sein de sa famille" was adapted as a Loyalist hymn after the Bourbon restoration. It is used in the 2nd movement of Vieuxtemp's 5th Violin Concerto

The first movement of Michel Corrette's Concerto comique no. 24 is based on "On dit qu'à 15 ans on plaît"

== Recordings ==
- Lucile, arias et quartet, DUCHESNE Solistes de Liege, conducted by Emmanuel Koch Cat: DD 8026
- Lucile, soloists, Choeurs et Orchestre de l'Opera de Wallonie, conducted Roger Rossel Cat: MBM 28

== Sources ==
- Michel Brenet Grétry: sa vie et ses œuvres (F. Hayez, 1884)
- David Charlton Grétry and the Growth of Opéra Comique (Cambridge University Press, 1986)
- Ronald Lessens Grétry ou Le triomphe de l'Opéra-Comique (L'Harmattan, 2007)
- Lucile by David Charlton, in 'The New Grove Dictionary of Opera', ed. Stanley Sadie (London, 1992) ISBN 0-333-73432-7
