= Caroline Wuiet =

French composer

Caroline Wuiet (Vuyet, Vuïet), later Baronne Aufdiener (Auffdiener) (17 August 1766 – 22 May 1835) was a French journalist, novelist and composer, best known for opera.

== Life ==
Caroline Wuiet, daughter of an organist, was born in Rambouillet, France. She was considered a child prodigy at age five and was presented to Queen Marie-Antoinette by Princess de Lamballe. The queen took her as an adopted daughter and saw that she received an education in the arts. Wuiet studied music under André Grétry, painting with Greuze and theater with Beaumarchais.

Wuiet began her career as a composer and librettist at the age of eighteen with Le Trompeur trompé, but was disappointed that the opera was not performed. She was given the opportunity to write a sequel to Gretry's L'Épreuve villageoise (1784), and wrote both the music and libretto for L'Heureuse erreur with more success. She later became a concert pianist, still enjoying the patronage of Marie-Antoinette. As a Royalist, Wuiet went into hiding during the French Revolution and remained there through the Reign of Terror, leaving journals regarding the years of the French Revolution.

Under the French Directory, Wuiet began composing again and enjoyed more success with sonatas. During this time, she also established a newspaper and wrote for other publications. She married Colonel Baron Joseph Auffdiener in 1807 and went with him to Lisbon where he was imprisoned and died. Wuiet returned to France and continued writing and composing, but suffered from mental disorders and died homeless after living in the park at St. Cloud, France. She also wrote and composed under her married name, Aufdiener, and the pseudonym Donna Elidora.

== Works ==
Musical works include:

- Trois Sonates pour le clavecin avec violon et basse (Paris, 1785)
- Potpourri pour clavecin ou le forte piano, Op. 2 (published as Aufdiener)
- Six Romances avec accompagnement de piano, Op. 3 (as Aufdiener, Paris 1798)
- L'Heureuse erreur, ou La Suite de l'épreuve villageoise, opéra-comique [by Grétry and Desforges], performed Théàtre Beaujolais, Paris, 1786; libretto and music by Caroline Wuiet
- Overture de L'Heureux stratagème [by Jardin] ... arrangée par l'auteur pour le piano-forte avec accompagnement de violon ad libitum (Paris, [1786])
- Le Trompeur trompé, "comédie mêlée d'ariettes", 3 acts (not performed)

Literary works:

- Angelina, comédie (1782)
- Sophie, comédie, performed at Variety Theatre (1787)
- Zephyr and Flora, opera in three acts (published Brussels, 1784)
- Esope au bal de l'Opéra, ou Tout Paris en miniature (Paris, 1802)
