= La fée Urgèle =

French opéra comique by Egidio Duni

- Opéra comique by Egidio Duni
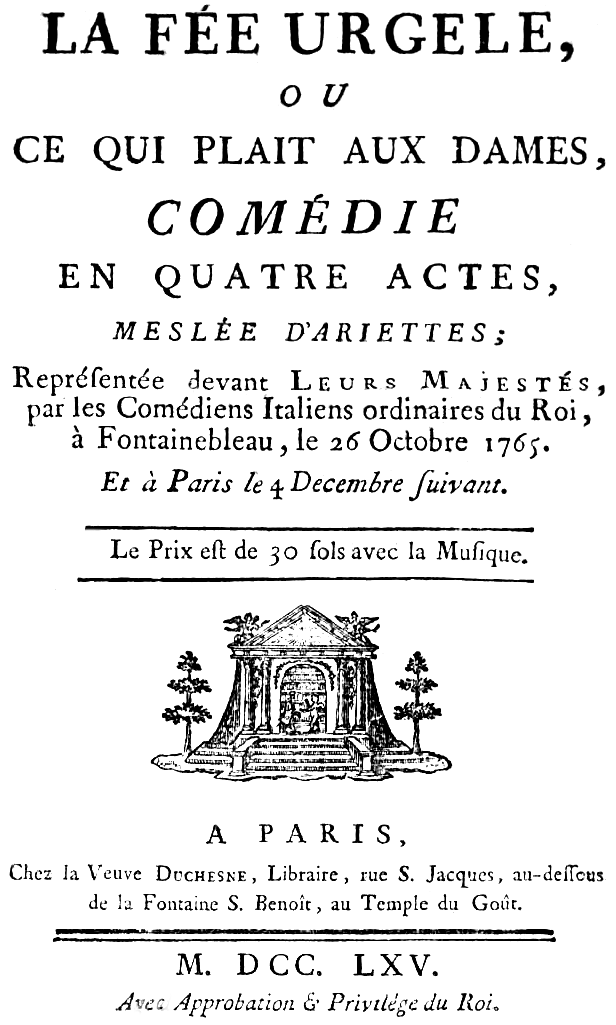
- Cover of the libretto
- Translation: The Fairy Urgèle
- Librettist: Charles-Simon Favart
- Language: French
- Based on: Voltaire's Ce qui plaît aux dames; Chaucer's "The Wife of Bath's Tale"
- Premiere: 26 October 1765; Théâtre Royal de la Cour, Palace of Fontainebleau

La fée Urgèle, ou Ce qui plaît aux dames (French pronunciation: [la fe yʁʒɛl u sə ki plɛ o dam], The Fairy Urgèle, or What Pleases Women) is an opéra comique (specifically a comédie mêlée d'ariettes) in four acts by the composer Egidio Duni. The libretto, by Charles-Simon Favart, is based on Voltaire's Ce qui plaît aux dames and Chaucer's "The Wife of Bath's Tale".

== Performance history ==
The opera was first performed at the Théâtre Royal de la Cour at the Palace of Fontainebleau on 26 October 1765. The elaborate medieval staging cost 20,000 livres according to Grimm in his Correspondance littéraire. It was revived at the Comédie-Italienne on 4 December 1765 and given over 100 times in the following years, popularizing medieval settings for other operas such as André Grétry's Aucassin et Nicolette (1779) and Richard Coeur-de-lion (1784).

The opera was revived at the Opéra Comique for 8 performances from 12–20 April 1991 by Les Arts Florissants ensemble under the baton of Christophe Rousset and with Monique Zanetti in the title role. and preceded by La répétition interrompue, also by Favart. The production toured Caen, Montpellier, Colmar, Mulhouse, and Strasbourg in February 1994.

== Roles and role creators ==
An old woman, costume design

- The Fairy Urgèle (soprano), Marie-Thérèse Laruette
- Marton (soprano), Marie-Thérèse Laruette
- Robinette (soprano), Marie Favart
- Thérèse (soprano), Marie Favart
- An old woman (soprano), Marie Favart
- Robert, a knight (tenor), Clairval (Jean-Baptiste Guignard)
- La Hire, Robert's squire (basse-taille), Joseph Caillot
- Queen Berthe (soprano), Eulalie Desglands
- Denise (spoken), Catherine Foulquier, 'Catinon'
- The Lady-Attorney General of the Court of Love (spoken), Mlle Catinon
- Old Lady-Councillors of the Court of Love (spoken ?), Gabriel-Éléonor-Hervé Dubus de Champville, 'Soli', and Antoine-Étienne Balletti (travesti)
- The usherette (?), Mlle Léonore
- Philinte, shepherd (tenor), M. Lobreau
- Licidas, another shepherd (tenor), Nicolas Beaupré
- Lisette, shepherdess (soprano), Mlle Adélaïde
- The chief huntsman (spoken ?), Jean-Baptiste Dehesse

== Synopsis ==
Robert is a knight imprisoned in a 7th-century French court controlled by women. He must answer the question: what gives the most pleasure to women? He is obliged to agree to marry an old woman who is then transformed into the beautiful Marton.

== Sources ==
- Original libretto: La fée Urgele, ou Ce qui plait aux dames, Comédie en quatre actes mêlée d'ariettes, Paris, Veuve Duchesne, 1766. Via Google Books
- Antoine de Léris, Dictionnaire portatif historique et littéraire des théatres, ... (2nd edition, revised, corrected and considerably augmented), Paris, Jombert, 1763.
- Casaglia, Gherardo (2005)."26 October 1765". L'Almanacco di Gherardo Casaglia (in Italian).
- Cook, Elisabeth (1992), "Fee Urgèle, La" in The New Grove Dictionary of Opera, ed. Stanley Sadie (London) ISBN 0-333-73432-7
