= Le Huron =

1768 opera by André Grétry

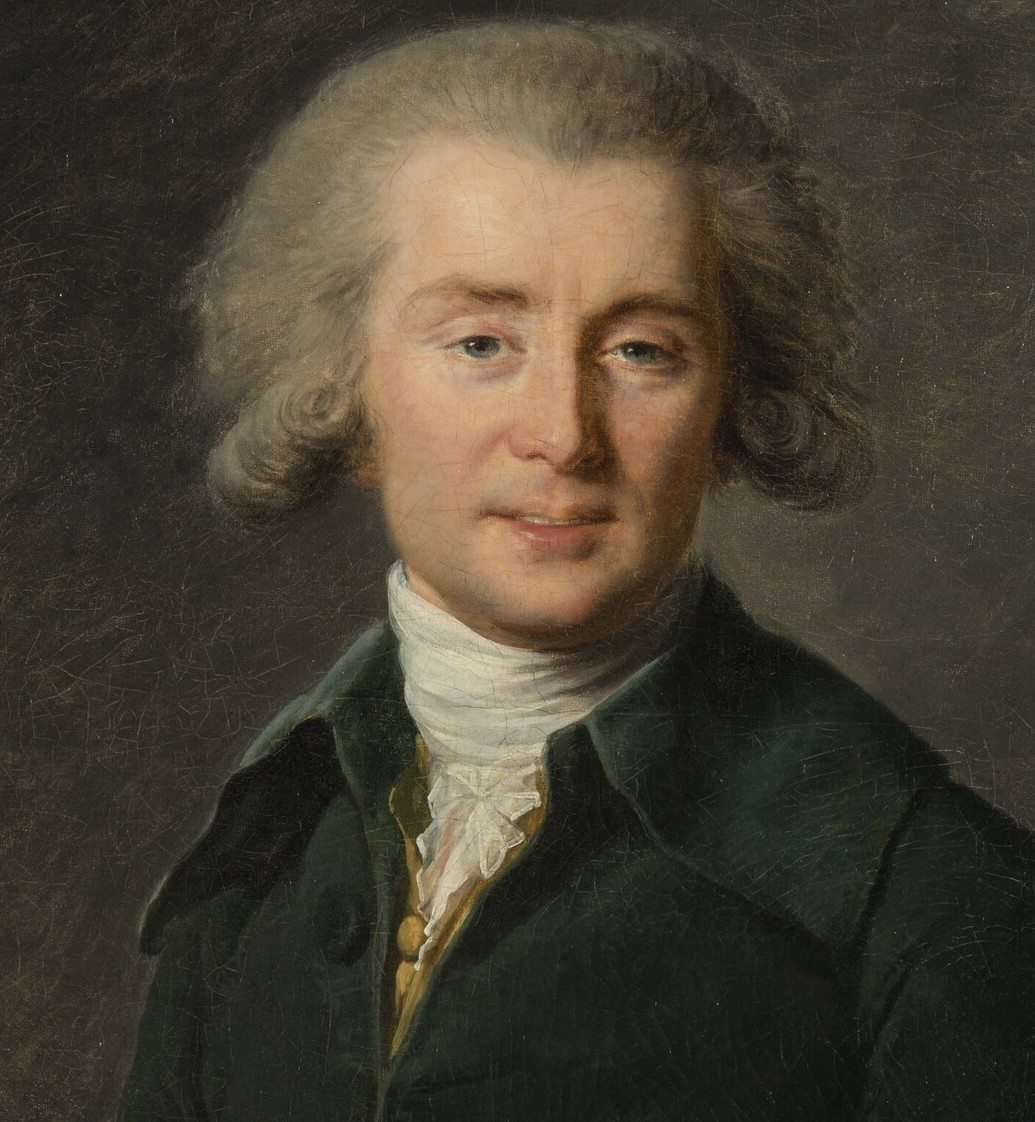
André Grétry

Le Huron (The Huron) is a French opéra comique in two acts by André Grétry. The libretto is by Jean-François Marmontel based on the story L'Ingénu (1767) by Voltaire. It was the composer's first big success with Parisian audiences.

== Performance history ==
It was first performed on 20 August 1768 by the Comédie-Italienne at the Hôtel de Bourgogne in Paris.

It was revived in 2010 and 2011:

- 12 December 2010, Bourgueil Abbey (France), conductor: Julien Dubruque (concert version)
- 1 November 2011, Theatre Adyar (Paris, France), conductor: Julien Dubruque; stage director: Henri Dalem

== Roles ==
Roles, voice types, premiere cast
Role	Voice type	Premiere cast, 20 August 1768
The Huron	baritone	Joseph "Giuseppe" Caillot
Gilotin	tenor	Jean-Louis Laruette
An officer	tenor	Jean-Baptiste Guignard, called Clairval
Saint-Yves	bass	
Mlle Saint-Yves	soprano	Marie-Thérèse Laruette
Kerkabon	bass	
Mlle Kerkabon	soprano	
Functionary	spoken	

== Synopsis ==
The story is set in Brittany and concerns a love affair between a local girl and a man raised by the Huron Indians in America.
