= Greg Fedderly =

American operatic tenor

Greg Fedderly is an American operatic tenor. He is a protégé of Plácido Domingo.

== Early life and education ==
Fedderly attended the University of Wisconsin-Eau Claire where he majored in music. He planned to be a music teacher, but after performing in several campus productions, he decided to pursue a career as an opera singer. Later, he went on to receive his master's degree from the University of Southern California.

== Career ==
Fedderly is a principal member of the Los Angeles Philharmonic, but he is a frequent performer in leading roles with several other opera companies including the Metropolitan Opera and the San Francisco Opera. Beyond his performances on stage, Fedderly has been in several filmed opera productions including Tom Jones, The Rake's Progress and El gato montés. Fedderly has also performed as Arcadio in Florencia en el Amazonas, Goro in Madama Butterfly, Monostatos in The Magic Flute, Brighella in Ariadne auf Naxos, Bob Boles in Peter Grimes and Don Basilio in The Barber of Seville. Fedderly recently won “Man of the Year” at the Dells Boat Tours; marking the highlight of his boat tour career that started as a pupil in school.
