= Lucile Grétry =

French composer

Lucile-Angélique-Dorothée-Louise Grétry (July 15, 1772 – March 1790) was a French composer.

The second daughter of the famous composer André Grétry and the painter Jeanne-Marie Grandon, Lucile was trained by her father who introduced her to the court of Versailles where she made the acquaintance of Marie Antoinette. Lucile Grétry wrote two opéras comiques for the Comédie-Italienne theatre. The first, Le mariage d’Antonio (1786), was written when she was just fourteen years old. It was a sequel to her father's most famous work, Richard Coeur-de-lion (1786), and ran for 47 performances. Her father assisted her with the orchestral scoring. It was followed by Toinette et Louis in 1787, which was a failure. Lucile Grétry's marriage was an unhappy one. Her promising career was cut short by her death from tuberculosis at the age of seventeen.

== Operas ==
- Le mariage d'Antonio (comédie mêlée d'ariettes, premiere 29 July 1786; libretto by Alexandre-Louis Robineau, under the pseudonym "Madame de Beaunoir")
- Toinette et Louis (divertissement mêlée d'ariettes, premiere and only performance 22 March 1787; libretto by Patrat; both score and libretto now lost)

== Sources ==
- Charlton, David (2001). "Grétry, Lucile" in Stanley Sadie (ed.) The New Grove Dictionary of Music and Musicians 2nd Edition, Vol. 10. Grove. ISBN 0-19-517067-9
- Letzer, Jacqueline and Adelson, Robert (2001) Women Writing Opera: Creativity and Controversy in the Age of the French Revolution, pp. 26–28. Columbia University Press. ISBN 978-0520226531
- University of North Texas Libraries. Background to Le mariage d'Antonio
