= Jeanne-Marie Grandon =

French artist (1746–1807)

Jeanne-Marie Grandon, later Grétry (1746–1807) was a French painter.

Grandon was likely born in Lyon, the daughter of Lyonnais painter Charles Grandon, and was one of a number of members of the family to become artists. She married composer André Grétry in Paris in 1771, having already given birth to the first of their three daughters. All three died before the age of twenty, although Lucile had already begun to attract some notice for her compositions. The three were the subject of a pastel by their mother which hung in the bedroom of the family residence, the Ermitage at Montmorency. Also recorded are portraits of her husband. Grandon herself was painted by Adèle Romany. The location of her death is unknown, but is presumed to be Paris.
