= Marie-Thérèse Laruette =

French opera singer and playwright

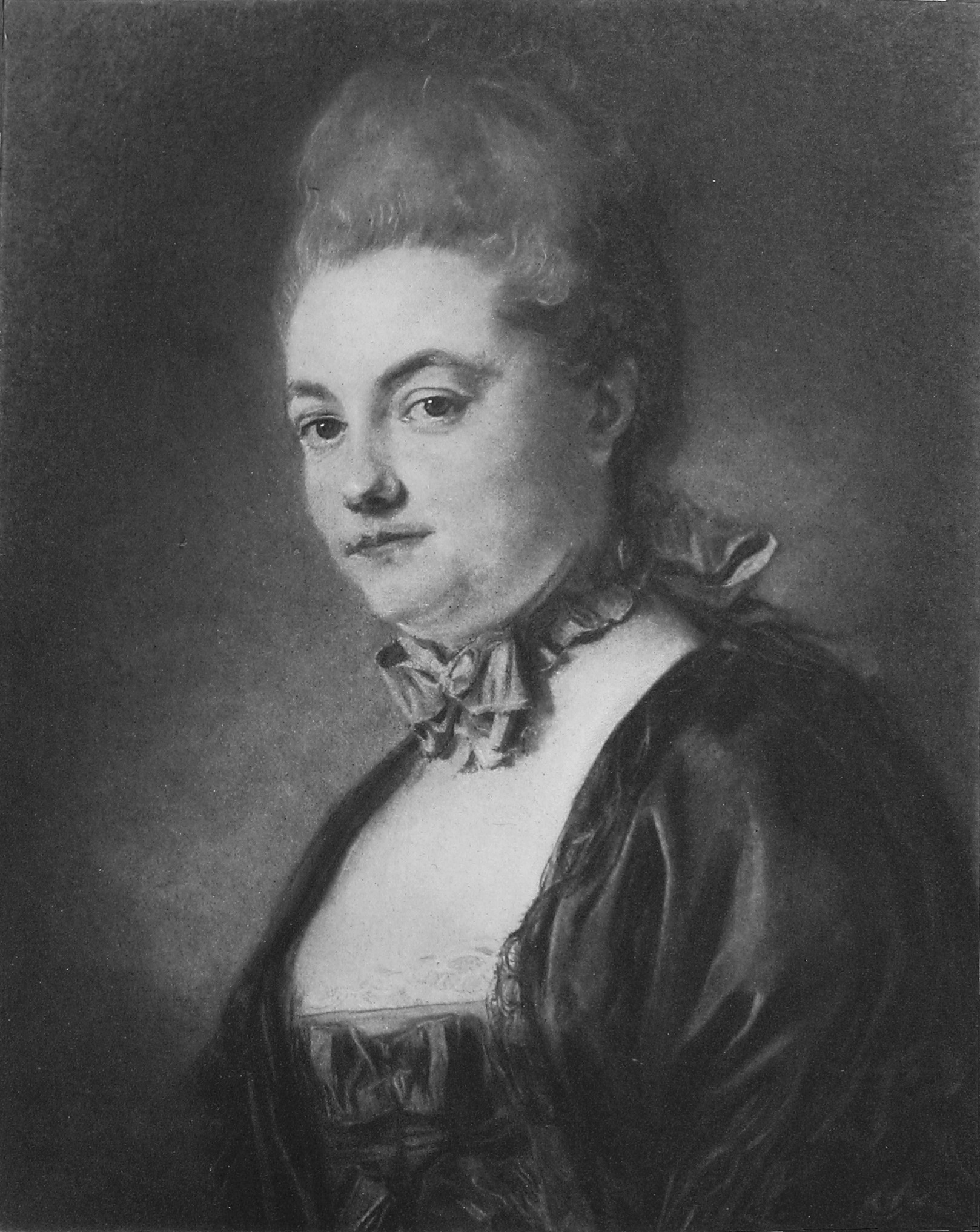
Marie-Thérèse Laruette Pastel by Jean-Baptiste Perronneau

Marie-Thérèse Laruette (1744 –1837) was a French opera singer and playwright from Paris. She was a member of the troupe of the Comédie-Italienne, with which the Opéra-Comique was merged in 1762.

== Biography ==
She was born Marie-Thérèse Vilette, the daughter of a master Parisian tailor who lived in Paris near the Opera and the Comédie-Italienne theaters. After noticing that his daughter was "addicted to the theater", her father took steps to make sure she acquired the education she would need to pursue an operatic career.

At 14 years of age, Marie-Thérèse sang soprano for the first time at the Opéra-Comique. She made her professional debut at the Paris Opéra in 1758 before moving to the Comédie-Italienne in 1761. There she performed operas by Monsigny and Grétry, in particular Le déserteur, in which she created the leading role of Louise, in 1767.

At 17 years of age, she married, Jean-Louis Laruette (1731–1792), who was a singer and a composer in the Comédie-Italienne. Although she began her career as a beginner, over her years at with the company, her fame eclipsed the less brilliant career of her spouse who was eventually given supporting roles to play.

According to Legrande, "Marie-Thérèse Laruette was credited with having oriented the style of the heroines of comic-opera towards more sensitivity and decency, especially in the 1770s."

Marie-Thérèse Laruette retired from the theater at the age of 33, apparently due to poor health because of the rigorous work schedule requiring her to perform often during extremely heavy theatrical seasons.

She died at 93.

== Selected works ==
Laruette sang in numerous operas, including the following.

- 1765: La fée Urgèle
- 1765: Tom Jones
- 1765: L'école de la jeunesse
- 1767: Le Huron
- 1767: Le déserteur
- 1769: Le tableau parlant
- 1771: Zémire et Azor

== Bibliography ==
- Raphaelle Legrand, Personnes et personnages à l'Opéra-Comique de 1762 à 1786 : Marie-Thérèse Laruette et Marie-Jeanne Trial, actes du colloque « L'Opéra-comique à l'époque de Boieldieu », Rouen, March 2001

== Iconography ==
- Jean-Baptiste Perronneau, Portrait de femme: Marie-Thérèse de Villette, femme Laruette (54x43 cm) in Cent pastels du XVIIIe (Henry Michel-Lévy's collection), (p. 404)
