= Rescue opera =

Genre of opera in 18th and 19th centuries

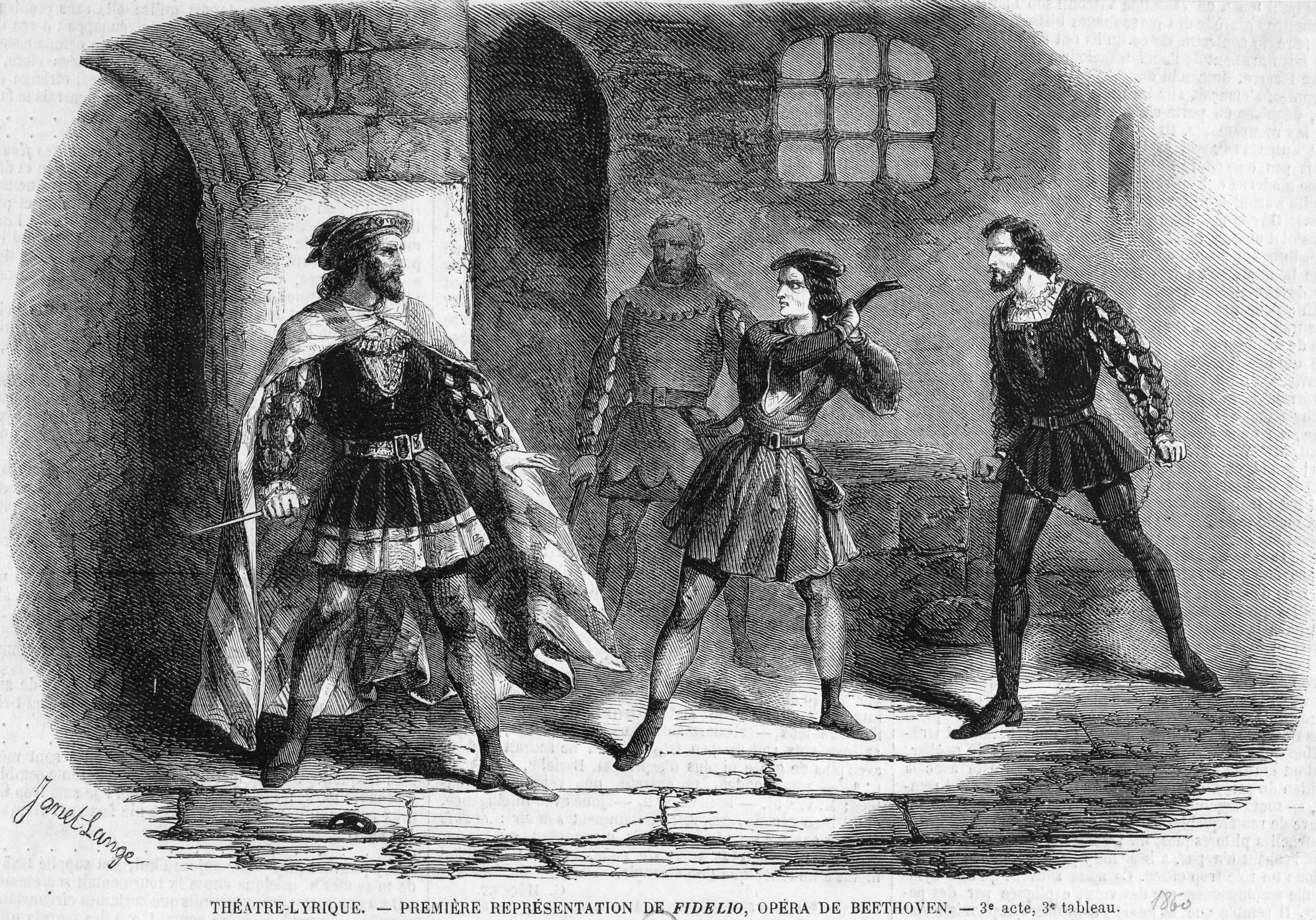
Fidelio: Leonore prevents Pizarro from killing Florestan.

Rescue opera was a genre of opera in the late 18th and early 19th centuries in France and Germany. Generally, rescue operas deal with the rescue of a main character from danger and end with a happy dramatic resolution in which lofty humanistic ideals triumph over base motives. Operas with this kind of subject matter became popular in France around the time of the French Revolution; a number of such operas dealt with the rescue of a political prisoner. Stylistically and thematically, rescue opera was an outgrowth of the French bourgeois opéra comique; musically, it began a new tradition that would influence German Romantic opera and French grand opera. The most famous rescue opera is Ludwig van Beethoven's Fidelio.

== Term ==
"Rescue opera" was not a contemporary term. Dyneley Hussey used the term in English in 1927 as a translation of Karl M. Klob's 1913 reference to Fidelio as "das sogenannte Rettungs- oder Befreiungsstück" in Die Oper von Gluck bis Wagner. David Charlton believes that rescue opera is not an authentic genre, and that the concept was coined to make what he believes is a nonexistent connection between Beethoven's work and French opera. Patrick J. Smith, on the other hand, observes: "The 'rescue opera'...antedated the Revolution, but 'rescue opera' as a genre was a product of it."

In French, this genre is referred to as the pièce à sauvetage or opéra à sauvetage, while in German it is called Rettungsoper, Befreiungsoper (liberation opera), or Schreckensoper (terror opera).

== Examples ==
See: Category:Rescue operas

Early opéras comiques with rescue themes include Pierre-Alexandre Monsigny's Le roi et le fermier (1762) and Le déserteur (1769), and André Grétry's Richard Coeur-de-lion (1784). These are sometimes called early rescue operas, or conversely predecessors of the rescue opera.

Henri Montan Berton's Les rigueurs du cloître (1790) has been described as the first rescue opera; Luigi Cherubini's Lodoïska (1791) has also been named a founding work of the genre. Other examples from the end of the eighteenth and beginning of the nineteenth century, the period when rescue opera flourished, are Nicolas Dalayrac's Camille ou Le souterrain (1791), Jean-François Le Sueur's La caverne (1793), and Cherubini's Les deux journées (1800).

While the rescue opera was primarily a French genre, the two best-known operas in the genre are not French. Ludwig van Beethoven's Fidelio is by far the most famous example today, and was also influenced by the German Singspiel. A work which is similar to Fidelio is Rossini's Torvaldo e Dorliska of 1815.

Bedřich Smetana's Dalibor (1868), which contains no spoken dialogue and which bears marks of Wagnerian influence, has nonetheless been called a rescue opera, in part because of its political themes.

Mikhail Glinka and his first opera A Life for the Tsar, premiered in 1836, used the French operatic form as inspiration for its formal structure.

== Style and themes ==
Rescue opera was primarily a product of the French Revolution. The social changes of the period meant that opera must now appeal to the masses, and post-aristocratic, patriotic, idealistic themes—such as resistance to oppression, secularism, the political power of individuals and of people working together, and fundamental changes to the status quo—were popular. The Terror influenced stories of fear and imprisonment; a number of plots, including that of Fidelio and other operas based on the same libretto as well as that of Les deux journées, were taken from real life.

Stylistically, rescue opera was an outgrowth of the opéra comique, a bourgeois genre. Like opéras comiques, rescue operas contained spoken dialogue, popular musical idioms, and bourgeois characters. Works with libretti by Michel-Jean Sedaine were particularly influential. The influx of suspenseful or tragic subjects into opéra comique caused confusion in a system where tragedy was associated with through-composed scores and comedy with dialogue, precipitating a shift of musical theatre genres that paralleled the political shift which empowered the middle-class. Carl Dahlhaus writes, "No longer did the bourgeoisie function in comic casts merely as the butt of jokes; it demanded, and received, its part in the dignity of tragedy."

Some scholars describe the plots as featuring a deus ex machina like the ones present in opera seria plots, though the resolution still bore a closer resemblance to the endings of domestic comedies. However, others reject this term because the rescue is carried out through the actions of heroic people, rather than gods. John Bokina describes such endings, rather than as a "deus ex machina," as a "populus ex machina," in which virtuous human beings save the day.

These operas were also influenced by gothic fiction and melodrama. A number of rescue operas were adaptations of British gothic literature.

Rescue operas incorporated "local color" in the orchestra for operas set in exotic European locations. Folk songs and "picturesque" arias were used to indicate a setting; Lodoïska, for example, set in Poland, contains what may be the first polonaise in opera. However, melodies as such were avoided.

Dramatic and emotional intensity, as conveyed through music, became increasingly important. The fortissimo directions ff and even fff were often to be found in scores, and chromatic scales, tremolos, and intervals such as the diminished seventh heightened tension onstage. Jean Le Sueur, whose La Caverne was one of the more influential rescue operas, wrote in his score for Télémaque that arias should be sung with voix concentrée or in a manner that was très-concentrè. Long instrumental passages descriptive of storms or battles were also present.

== Impact ==
In its use of local color, heightened dramatic and emotional intensity, and inclusion of descriptive instrumental music, rescue opera preceded the works of German Romantics such as Carl Maria von Weber and, through him, Richard Wagner. Grandiosity in music and scenery, influenced by the political spectacles of the French Revolution and French Empire, influenced grand opera and the works of composers like Giacomo Meyerbeer.
