= Clairval =

French opera singer (1735–1795)

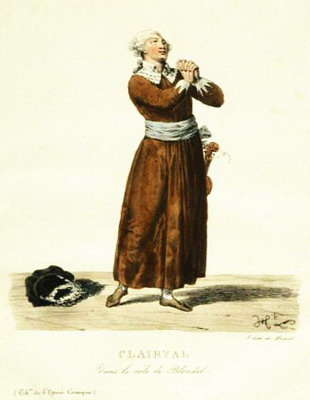
Clairval in the role of Blondel (opera Richard Cœur-de-Lion)

Clairval, real name Jean-Baptiste Guignard, (27 April 1735, Étampes – 1795, Paris) was an 18th-century French operatic singer (tenor), comedian and librettist. He played with the same authority drama, comedy and opera, in a considerable number of roles. Among the most notable were:

- 1765: Tom Jones (part of Tom Jones) by Philidor
- 1765: La fée Urgèle (part of Robert, a knight) by Egidio Duni
- 1768: Le Huron (an officer), by Grétry
- 1769: Le tableau parlant (part of Pierrot), by Grétry
- 1769: Le déserteur (part of Montauciel), by Monsigny
- 1771: Zémire et Azor, (part of Azor), by Grétry

This opéra comique was a version of Beauty and the Beast imagined by Marmontel, where Clairval had to become ugly; but he refused to don the first scheduled disguise: an animal fur. This role was one of his best success.

- 1773: L'Erreur d'un moment (part of Lucas), by Monvel
- 1776: Les mariages samnites (part of Agathis), by Grétry
- 1778: L'amant jaloux, (part of Don Alonze), by Grétry
- 1779: Aucassin et Nicolette (Aucassin), by Grétry
- 1781: Les maris corrigés (part of Germival), comedy in verse by La Chabeaussière
- 1784: Richard Cœur-de-Lion, (part of Blondel, in which he excelled), by Grétry
- 1785: L'amant statue, (part of M. Michu), by Nicolas Dalayrac
- 1791: L'aristocrate ou le convalescent de qualité, by Fabre d'Églantine (28 January)

This role earned Clairval the nickname "Molé of the Comédie-italienne".

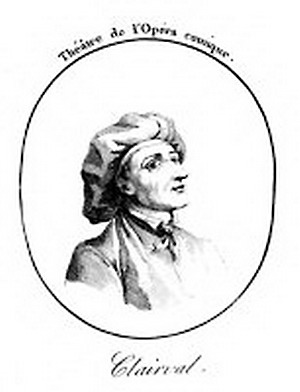
Clairval wearing a costume

== Sources ==
- Ferdinand Hoefer : Nouvelle Biographie Générale, [tome 10]
- Gaston Maugras :Le duc de Lauzun et la Cour intime de Louis XV, 1907, (p. 174)
