= Le tableau parlant =

Opéra comique in one act by André Grétry

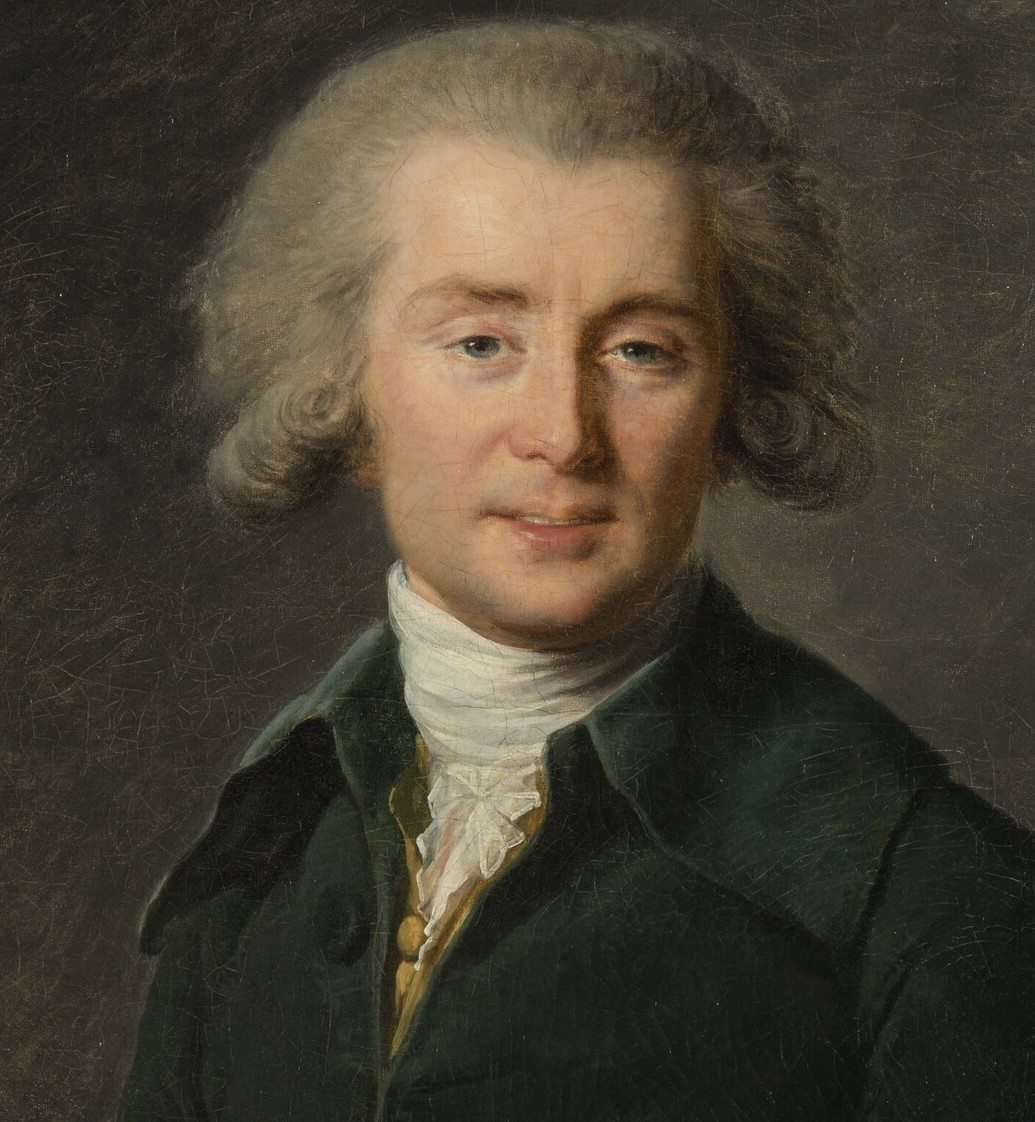
André Grétry

Le tableau parlant (French pronunciation: [lə tablo paʁlɑ̃], The Talking Picture) is an opéra comique, described as a comédie-parade, in one act by André Grétry. The French libretto was by Louis Anseaume.

== Performance history ==
It was first performed on 20 September 1769 by the Comédie-Italienne at the Hôtel de Bourgogne in Paris.

== Roles ==
Roles, voice types, premiere cast
Role	Voice type	Premiere cast, 20 September 1769
Isabelle	soprano	Marie-Jeanne Trial
Léandre	tenor	Antoine Trial
Cassandre	tenor	Jean-Louis Laruette
Pierrot	tenor	Jean-Baptiste Guignard
Columbine	soprano	Marie-Thérèse Laruette

== Synopsis ==
In the absence of Isabelle's lover Léandre, Cassandre persuades Isabelle to marry him instead. Cassandre leaves and in the meantime Léandre returns and Isabelle changes her mind. She asks Cassandre's portrait for his agreement to the changed state of affairs, only to find that Cassandre himself is concealed behind the picture.
