= L'épreuve villageoise =

Opéra bouffon in two acts by André Grétry

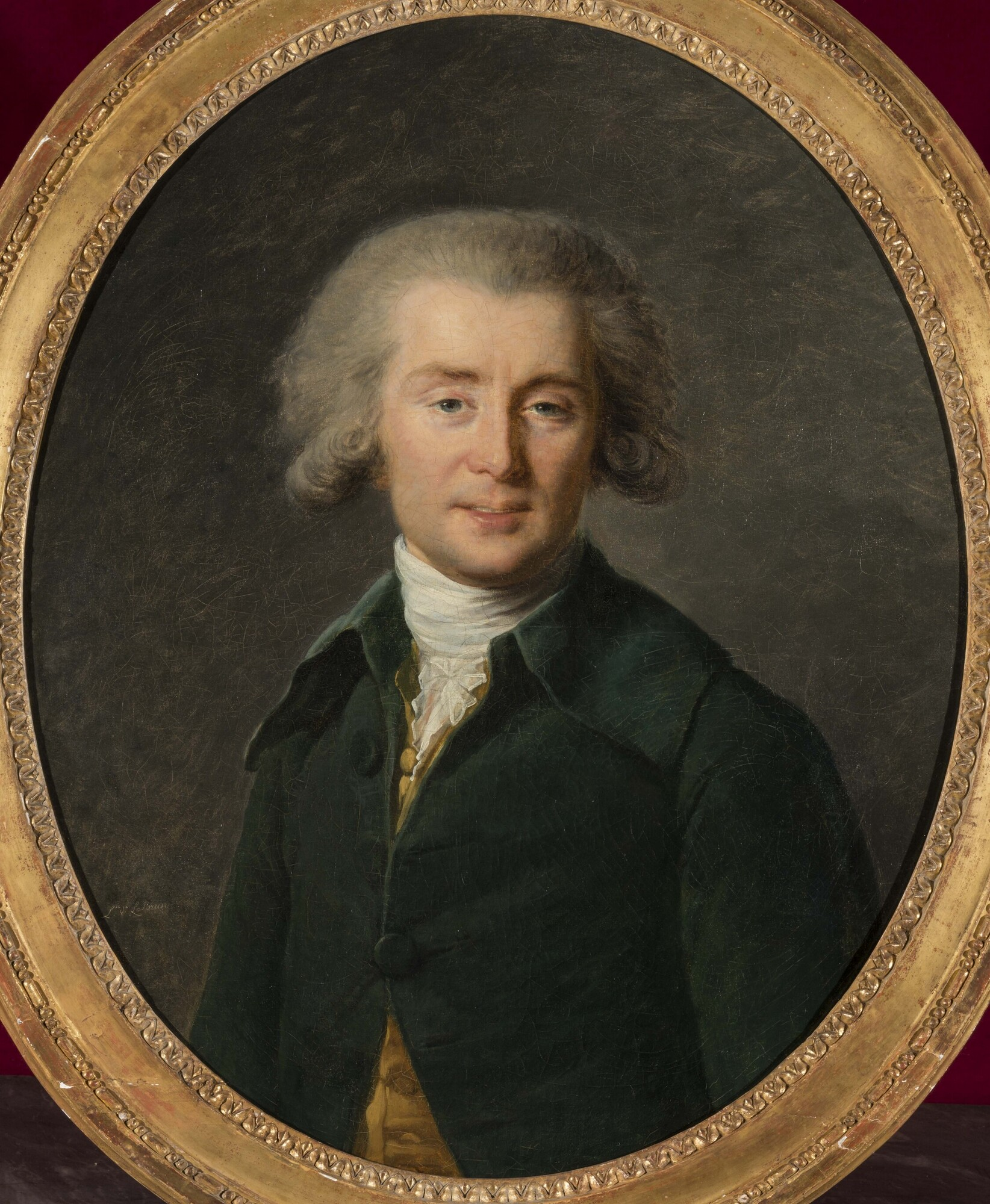
Composer André Grétry

L’épreuve villageoise (Trial in a Village) is an opéra bouffon in two acts by André Grétry to a French libretto by Pierre Desforges.

It is a revision of a work called Théodore et Paulin, which was performed once at Versailles on 5 March 1784 but never published.

== Performance history ==
L’épreuve villageoise was first performed on 24 June 1784 by the Théatre-Italien at the first Salle Favart in Paris. It became one of Grétry's most popular opéras-comiques during the 19th century. It was revived by the same company on 29 October 1801 at the Salle Feydeau and on 26 May 1853 at the second Salle Favart. The latter revival was given in a revised and reorchestrated version by Daniel Auber. The Théâtre Lyrique mounted a revival (presumably in the version by Auber) on 11 September 1863 at their theatre on the Place du Châtelet (today known as the Théâtre de la Ville), where it was performed for two seasons for a total of 48 representations. It was performed in New York, NY, USA on 27 and 28 May 2015 by the Opera Lafayette company at the French Institute Alliance Francaise. Another performance in Washington, DC, USA on 30 May 2015 was held at the Terrace Theater at the Kennedy Center.

== Roles ==
- Mme Hubert, a widow (soprano)
- Denise, her daughter (soprano)
- André, Denise's fiancé (tenor)
- La France (baritone)

== Recording ==
- L'épreuve villageoise, Sophie Junker (Denise), Talise Trevigne (Madame Hubert), Thomas Dolié (La France), Francisco Fernández-Rueda (André), Opera Lafayette, conducted by Ryan Brown (Naxos, 1 CD, 2016)

== Sources ==
- Casaglia, Gherardo (2005). "L'épreuve villageoise". L'Almanacco di Gherardo Casaglia (in Italian).
- Background of L’épreuve villageoise
- Walsh, T. J. (1981). Second Empire Opera: The Théâtre Lyrique, Paris, 1851–1870. London: John Calder. ISBN 978-0-7145-3659-0.
- Wild, Nicole; Charlton, David (2005). Théâtre de l'Opéra-Comique Paris: répertoire 1762-1972. Sprimont, Belgium: Editions Mardaga. ISBN 978-2-87009-898-1.
- Opera Lafayette 2015:
