= Thomas Haigh =

English violinist, pianist, and composer

Thomas Haigh (1769 – 1808), was an English violinist, pianist, and composer.

Haigh was born in London in 1769, and studied composition under Haydn in 1791 and 1792. Haigh's numerous compositions include sonatas for pianoforte solo and for pianoforte and violin or flute, serenatas, capriccios, and arrangements. Some of them were reprinted at Paris and others at Offenbach.

The better known of them are: Two sets of three sonatas, each for pianoforte, dedicated to Haydn, 1796(?); three sonatas for pianoforte, with accompaniment for violin or flute, London, 1798(?); three sonatas for pianoforte, airs by Giardini introduced, Op. 13, 1800(?); sonata for pianoforte, with air from ‘Beggar's Opera’ introduced, Op. 28, 1800(?); sonata, with air Viva tutte, accompaniment flute or violin, 1812(?); sonata, pianoforte, dedicated to Miss Bain, 1817(?); grand sonata, dedicated to Miss Heathcote, 1819; ‘Yesterday,’ ‘Whan you told us,’ and other ballads, about 1800. A violin concerto and a parody on the 'Lodoiska' for flute (see Clementi's Catalogue) are also ascribed to Haigh in the ‘Dictionary of Music’ of 1827.

From 1793 to 1801 Haigh lived in Manchester, where he probably had family connections. He died in London in April 1808.
