= Zémire et Azor =

Opera by André Grétry

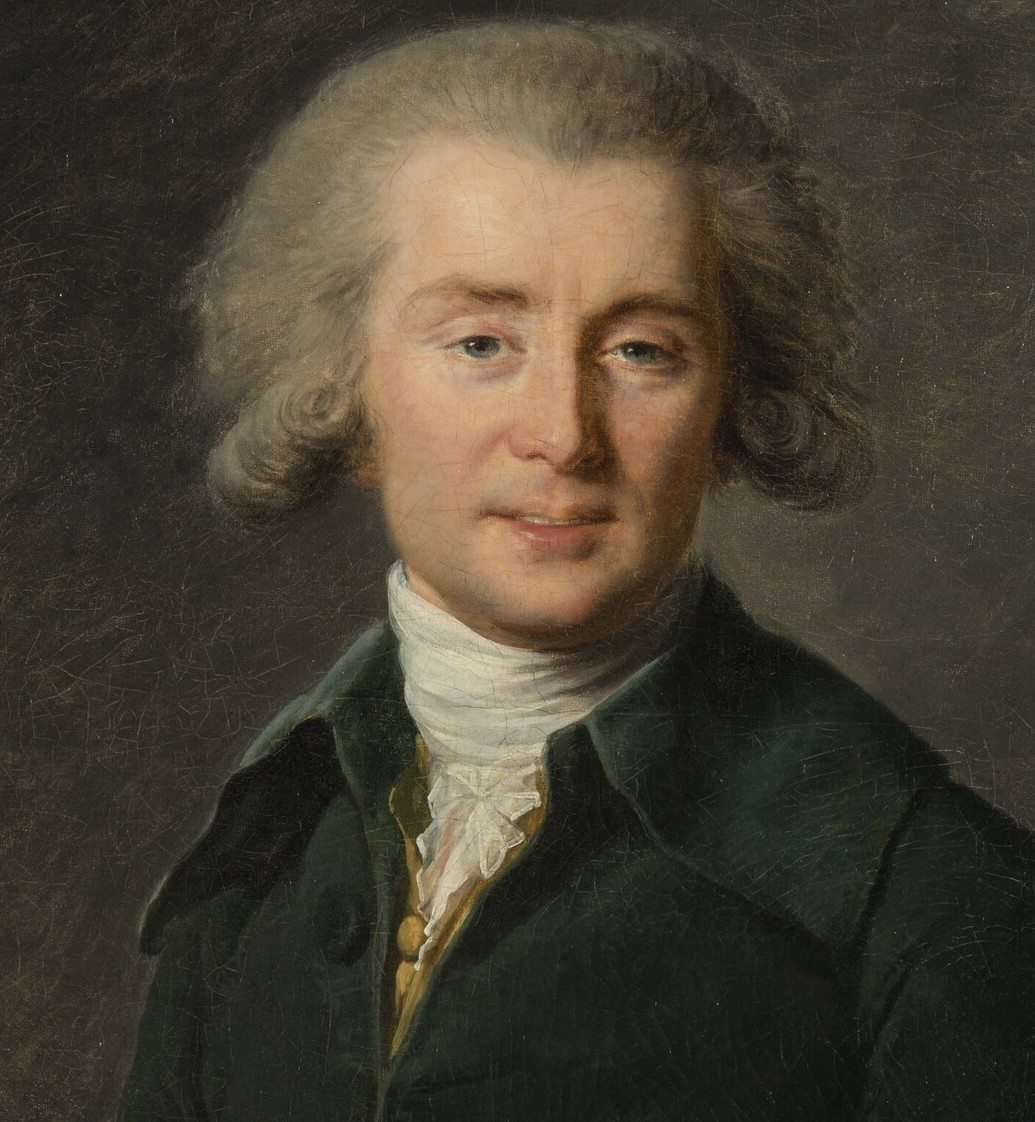
André Grétry

Zémire et Azor (Zémire and Azor) is an opéra comique, described as a comédie-ballet mêlée de chants et de danses, in four acts by the Belgian composer André Grétry. The French text was by Jean-François Marmontel based on La Belle et la bête (Beauty and the Beast) by Jeanne-Marie Leprince de Beaumont, and Amour pour amour by Pierre-Claude Nivelle de La Chaussée. The opera includes the famous coloratura display piece La Fauvette in which the soprano imitates birdsong.

== Performance history ==
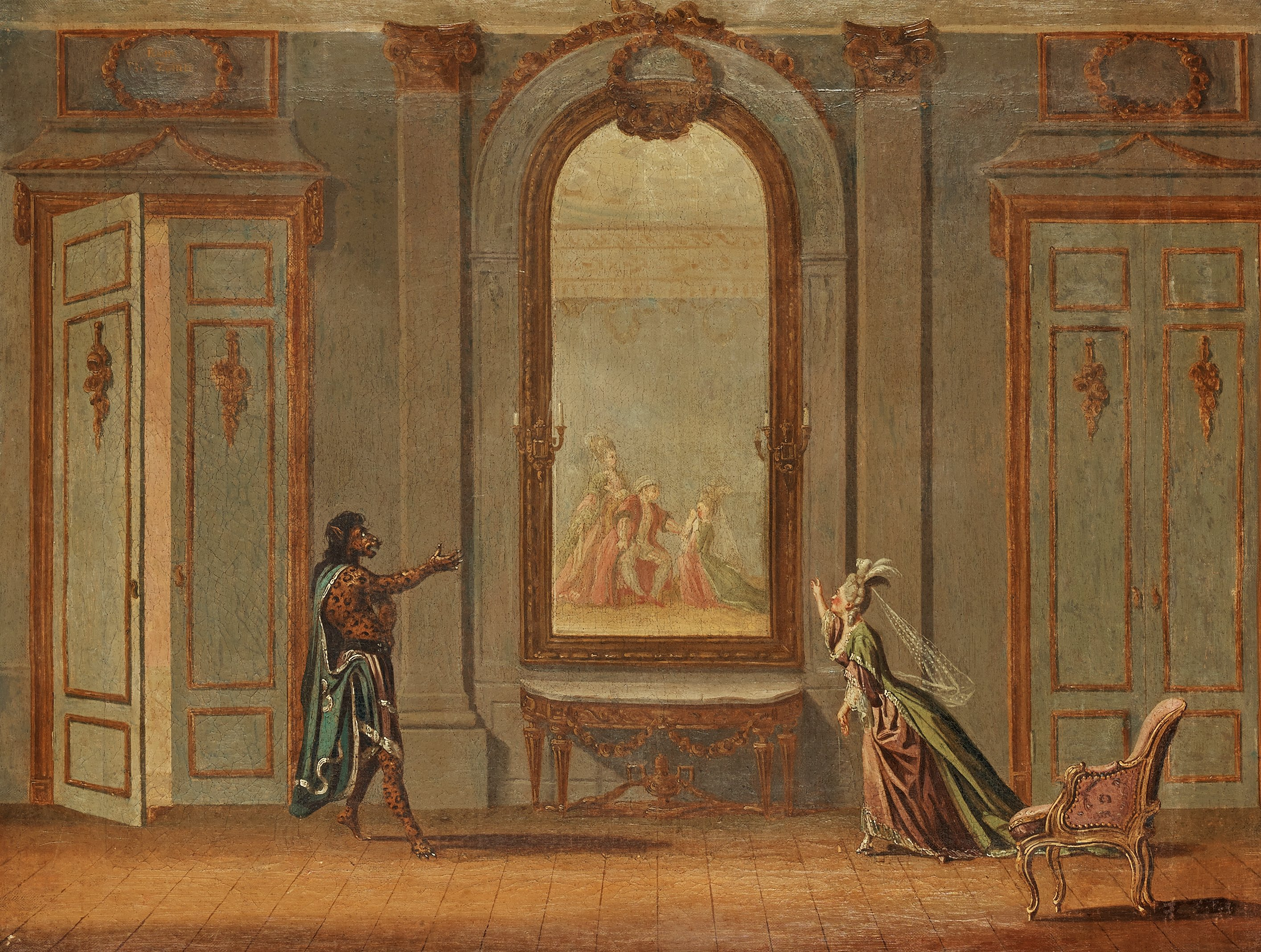
Zemire och Azor (Akt 3, scen 6) - painting by Pehr Hilleström based on a 1778 performance at Drottningholm Palace Theatre.

It was first performed by the Comédie-Italienne at Fontainebleau on 9 November 1771 and at the Hôtel de Bourgogne in Paris on 16 December 1771. It stayed in the French repertory until at least 1821 and enjoyed worldwide success. It was staged at the court of Saint Petersburg, Russia, in 1774. It was performed at the Swedish court at the Drottningholm Palace Theatre in 1778, in London at the King's Theatre in 1779, in New York and Philadelphia in 1787 and in Havana in 1791.

An Italian adaptation, with (among other changes) recitatives to replace the spoken text, was first performed at Mannheim Court Opera in 1776. This was followed by a second version with more radical changes to meet the norms of Italian opera.

In modern times Zémire et Azor was performed at the Bielefeld Opera (Germany) in 1991 in a version created by John Dew. In 2023, a new production of the Italian version, Zemira e Azor, was staged by the Mannheim National Theatre at the Schlosstheater Schwetzingen.

== Roles ==
Role	Voice type	Premiere cast, 9 November 1771
Azor, a Persian prince, King of Kamir, at first in a frightening form	tenor	Clairval (Jean-Baptiste Guignard)
Sander, a Persian merchant from Ormuz	baritone	Joseph Caillot
Ali, his slave	tenor	Jean-Louis Laruette
Zémire, daughter to Sander	soprano	Marie-Thérèse Laruette
Fatmé, daughter to Sander	soprano	Marie-Jeanne Trial
Lisbé, daughter to Sander	soprano	Pétronille-Rosalie Beaupré
A Fairy	spoken role	Eulalie Desgland(s)

== Synopsis ==
Having been shipwrecked in a storm, the merchant Sander and his servant Ali find their way to a strange palace. A banquet has been laid, though there is no sign of the owner, and the two help themselves to the feast. When Sander plucks a rose from the palace garden to give to his daughter Zémire, the beast-like Azor appears. He is the owner of the palace and says Sander must pay with his life for stealing the rose, unless he can persuade one of his daughters to take his place. When she hears what has happened, Zémire agrees to sacrifice her life for her father and Ali leads her to the palace, where she almost faints at the fearsome sight of Azor. However, Azor proves to be a kind host, showing Zémire her family in a magic mirror and even allowing her to visit home again so long as she promises to return. After a stay with her family, Zémire decides to return to Azor and finds him in despair because he believes she has abandoned him. She protests that she cares about him and the magic spell on Azor is lifted now he has found love. He changes from a beast to a handsome prince and claims his kingdom with Zémire at his side.

== In Russia ==
- Thanks to this opera, "Zemire" (Земира) was the name of Catherine II's favorite Italian greyhound.

== Selected recordings ==
A suite of ballet music from the work was recorded by Thomas Beecham.

- Zémire et Azor – Mady Mesplé (Zémire), Roland Bufkens (Azor), Jean van Gorp (Sander), Jean-Claude Orliac (Ali) – Choeur et orchestre de chambre de Radio Télévision Belge, conducted by Edgard Doneux – (EMI, 1974)

== Sources ==
- Notes to the EMI CD by Michel Parouty.
- David Charlton, Grétry and the growth of opéra-comique, Cambridge, Cambridge University Press, 1986 (paperback edition cited: 2010, ISBN 978-0-521-15881-7)
- David Charlton, Zémire et Azor, in Stanley Sadie (ed), The New Grove Dictionary of Opera, New York, Oxford University Press, 1992, IV, p. 1224 ISBN 978-0-19-522186-2
