= Le déserteur (opera) =

Opera by Pierre-Alexandre Monsigny

Le déserteur (French pronunciation: [lə dezɛʁtœʁ], The Deserter) is a drame mélé de musique (opéra comique) by the French composer Pierre-Alexandre Monsigny with a libretto by Michel-Jean Sedaine. It was first performed on 6 March 1769 by the Comédie-Italienne at their public theatre, the Hôtel de Bourgogne in Paris.

The work was Monsigny's greatest musical success and is one of the key operas of late 18th-century French opéra comique. It was performed in Amsterdam (1769), Copenhagen (1770), Germany in German translation (1770: Hamburg and Brunswick; 1771: Frankfurt), London on 2 November 1773 in an English version by Charles Dibdin, who added music of his own and two numbers by Philidor, and was performed in New York City on 8 June 1787 in French and in Philadelphia on 11 July 1787 in English (London version). It was revived by the Paris Opéra-Comique on 28 July 1802 at the Salle Feydeau and on 30 October 1843 at the second Salle Favart, in a revised version re-orchestrated by Adolphe Adam. The company performed it over 300 times up to 1911. The work mixes serious and comic elements, an example of the latter being the behaviour of the drunkard Montauciel. The theme of a last-minute reprieve from execution influenced later rescue opera.

== Roles ==
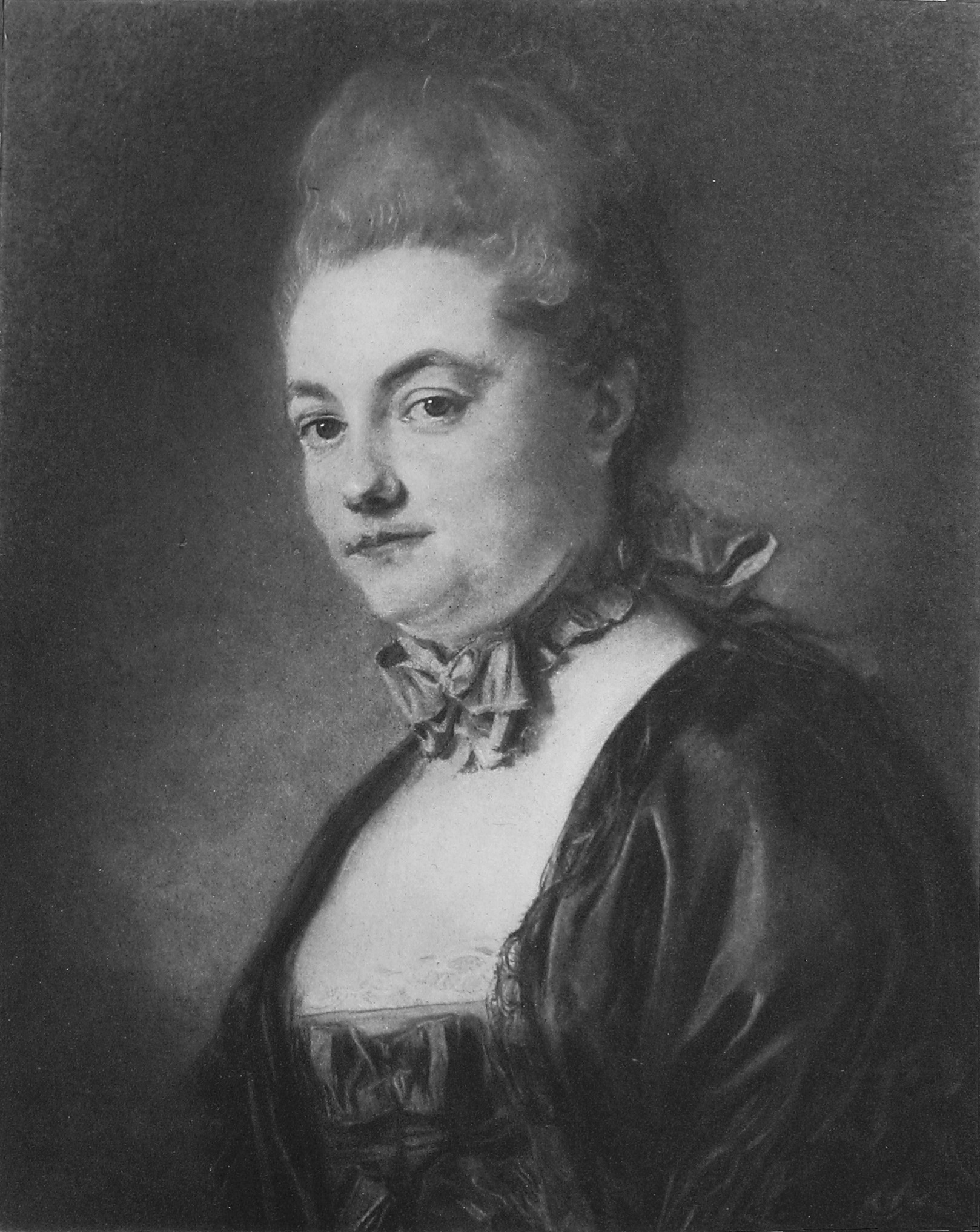
Marie-Thérèse Laruette Pastel by Jean-Baptiste Perronneau

Cast	Voice type	Premiere, 6 March 1769
Alexis, a soldier	baritone	Joseph Caillot
Louise, his fiancée	soprano	Marie-Thérèse Laruette
Jean-Louis, Louise's father	tenor	Jean-Louis Laruette
Alexis's aunt	soprano	Mme Bérard
Bertrand, Alexis's cousin	haute-contre	Antoine Trial
Jeannette, a young peasant	soprano	Pétronille-Rosalie Beaupré
Montauciel, a dragoon	tenor	Clairval (Jean-Baptiste Guignard)
Courchemin, a brigadier	basse-taille (bass-baritone)	M Nainville
Three guards	haute-contre, tenor, tenor	Robert Desbrosses, M Lemoyne etc.
The jailer	spoken role	

== Synopsis ==
Alexis, a young soldier, is engaged to be married to Louise, a farmer's daughter. On the orders of her father, she plays a trick on him by pretending she is going to marry her cousin Bertrand instead. Alexis falls for the deception and deserts the army in despair. He is captured and thrown into jail to await execution. Louise goes to see the king to beg for mercy for Alexis. She receives a letter of reprieve but faints from exhaustion before she is able to deliver it. All ends happily, however, when the king arrives in person and frees Alexis.

== Recording ==
- Le déserteur (musical numbers only): William Sharp (Alexis), Dominique Labelle (Louise), Ann Monoyios (Jeannette), David Newman (Montauciel/Second Guard), Eugene Galvin (Jean-Louis/Third Guard), Tony Boutté (Bertrand/First Guard), Darren Perry (Courchemin), Claire Kuttler (Aunt Marguerite), Andrew Adelsberger (Jailer), Opera Lafayette Orchestra, conducted by Ryan Brown (Naxos 8.660263-64, 2010)

== Adaptations ==
The opera was adapted as a pantomime ballet at least three times in the eighteenth century:

- Zuchelli's Il disertore, first produced at the King's Theatre, London, in December 1779
- Jean Dauberval’s Le déserteur, first produced at Grand Théâtre de Bordeaux in 1772, and at the King's Theatre, London in May 1784 and the Théâtre de la Porte-Saint-Martin in 1804, in a production by Jean Aumer
- Maximilien Gardel’s Le déserteur, ballet d'action en trois actes, first produced at Fontainebleau on 21 October 1786 and the Paris Opéra on 16 January 1788

== Sources ==
- Viking Opera Guide ed. Holden (1993)
- (in Italian) Mellace, Raffaele, Déserteur, Le, in Gelli, Piero and Poletti, Filippo (editors), Dizionario dell'opera 2008, Milan, Baldini Castoldi Dalai, 2007, p. 304, ISBN 978-88-6073-184-5 (reproduced at Opera Manager)
- Sedaine, Michel (1769). Le déserteur: Drame en trois actes, en prose melée de musique. Par Monsieur Sedaine. La musique par M***. Représentée [sic!], pour la premiere fois, par les Comédiens Italiens ordinaires du Roi, le Lundi 6 Mars 1769, libretto, 82 pages. Paris: Chez Claude Herissant. View at Google Books.
- Philippe Vendrix (ed.) L'opéra-comique en France au XVIIIe siècle (Mardaga, 1992)
