= Daniil Kashin =

Russian composer

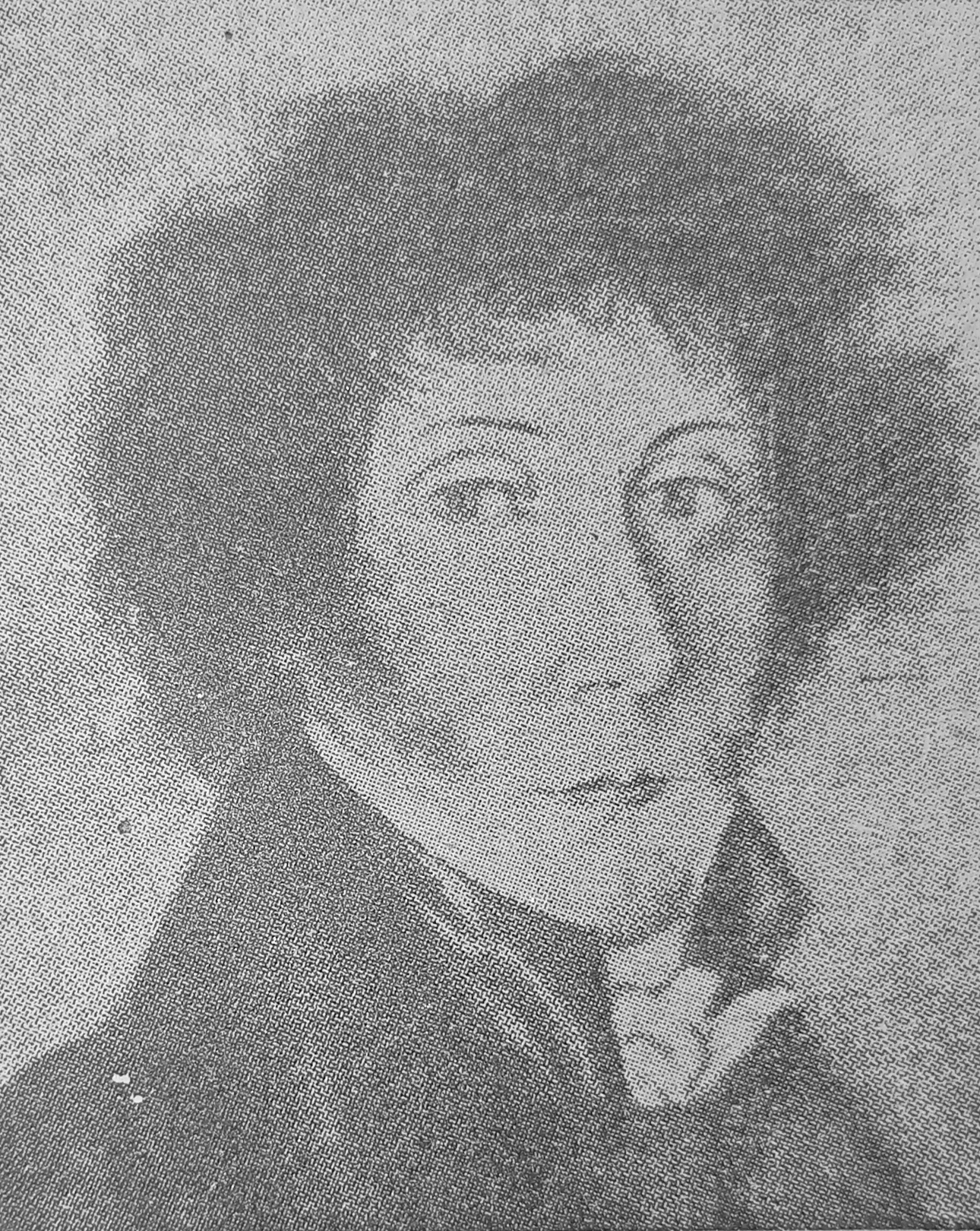
Portrait of Kashin

Daniil Nikititsch Kaschin (Russian: Даниил Никитич Кашин, romanized: Daniil Nikitich Kashin; 1769 – December 1841) was a Russian composer, pianist, conductor, and folk-song collector.

Kaschin was born the son of a serf of General Bibikov. He was a student of Giuseppe Sarti in Bessarabia in 1788. In 1790, he performed two of his own works in Moscow with a serf orchestra; Kashin went on to direct this ensemble in the 1790s. He was liberated from serfdom in 1798, and thereafter was one of the more important players in the musical life of Moscow. He often conducted concerts involving extremely large forces - choirs of 300 and orchestras of 200 players.

Kashin was a dedicated collector of Russian folk songs. He founded the Zhurnal otechestvennoy muzïki (Journal of National Music), which ran from 1806 to 1809, and published three volumes of Russian folk songs in his 1833-1834 Russkiye narodnïye pesni. Some of his works make use of folk melodies, patriotic themes, and other nationalistic elements.

He composed five operas, a piano concerto, additional pieces for piano, songs, and choir works. Most of his works are now lost.

== Works ==
=== Operas ===
Kashin's operas included:

- "Natalya, boyarskaya doch" was performed on October 21, 1801 in Moscow
- "Selskiy prazdnik" was performed in 1807
- "Olga prekrasnaya" was performed in Moscow on January 14, 1809
- "The One-Day Reign of Nourmahal" has been represented in 1817
