= Antoine Trial =

French opera singer

Antoine Trial (13 October 1737, Avignon – 5 February 1795, Paris) was a French singer and actor. He was the younger brother of the musician Jean-Claude Trial (1732–1771) and husband of soprano Marie-Jeanne Milon, stage name Félicité Mandeville (1746–1818).

After an education at the cathedral in Avignon, he followed his older brother to Paris in 1764 and joined the troupe of the Prince of Conti. On 4 July the same year, he made his debut at the Comédie-Italienne as Bastien in Le Sorcier by Philidor. On 12 December he sang the second tenor (a comic role) at Versailles in the court revival of Mondonville's Daphnis et Alcimadure, alongside the former stars of the Académie Royale de Musique, Marie Fel and Pierre Jelyotte.

Although considered an excellent actor and musician, his haute-contre voice was thin and nasal, and he specialised in the roles of peasants and servants. His roles included Bertrand in Le déserteur, Ali in Zémire et Azor, La Fleur in Monvel’s L'Erreur d'un moment, and André in L’épreuve villageoise. Trial became a French term for a tenor with a thin, nasal voice, examples being in the operas of Ravel and in The Tales of Hoffmann.

He sided with Robespierre in 1793 and became active in the Terror. After the fall of Robespierre he was forced to abandon the theatre and poisoned himself.
