= Joseph Caillot =

French actor and singer

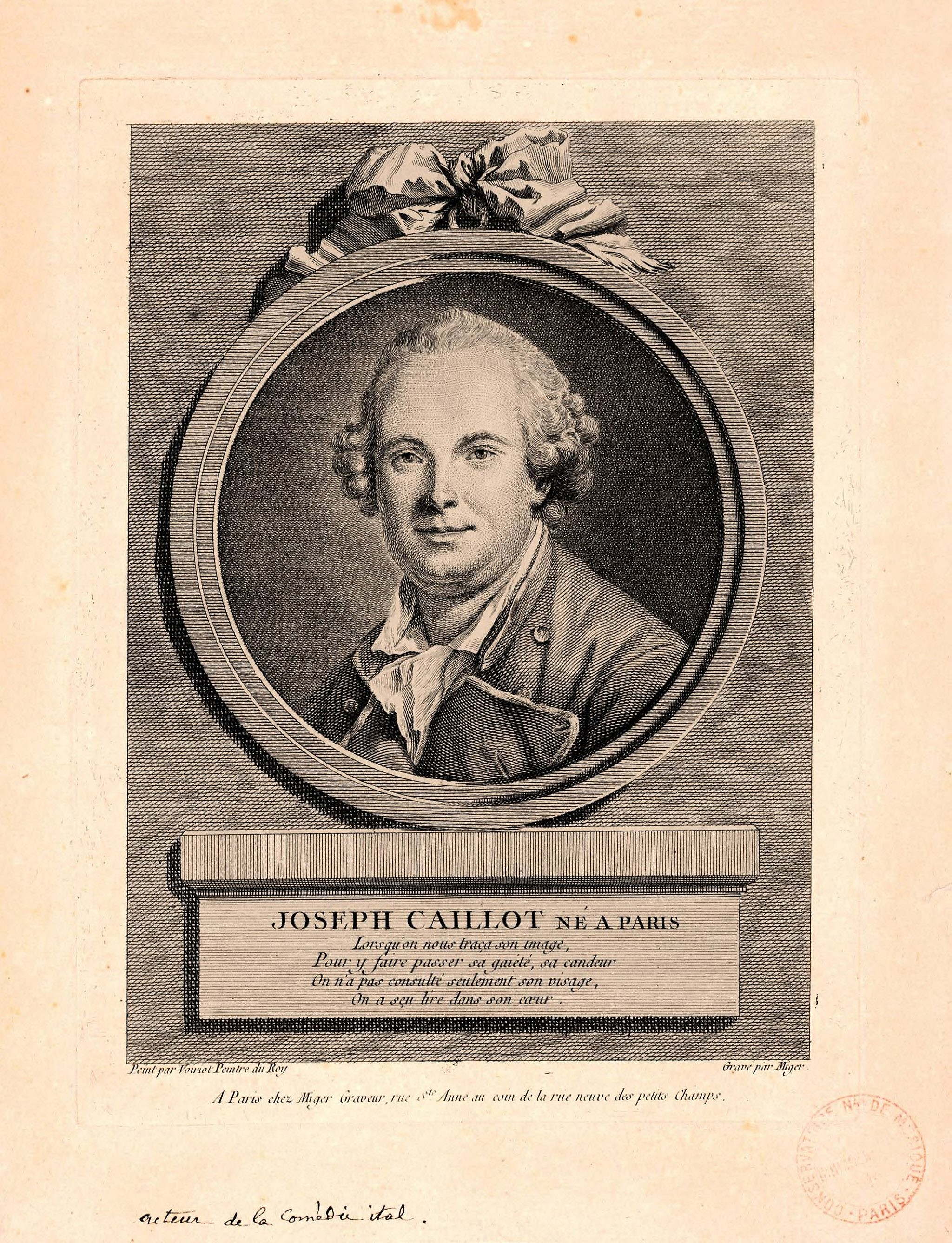
Joseph Caillot, engraving by Simon Charles Miger (c. 1770).

Joseph Caillot (24 January 1733, in Saint-Germain l'Auxerrois, Paris – 30 September 1816, in Paris) was a French actor and singer.

He was endowed with a very wide compass which enabled him to sing as a basse taille (bass-baritone), while also reaching the haute-contre tones. According to Rodolfo Celletti "he was a baritenor and a bass at the same time": Grétry and Monsigny used to notate his parts in the bass clef, but set them in high-baritone tessiture.

== Bibliography ==
- Émile Campardon, Les Comédiens du roi de la troupe italienne, Paris, Berger-Levrault et C^{ie}, 1880, vol. I, pp. 85–95.
