= André Grétry =

Composer from present-day Belgium (1741–1813)

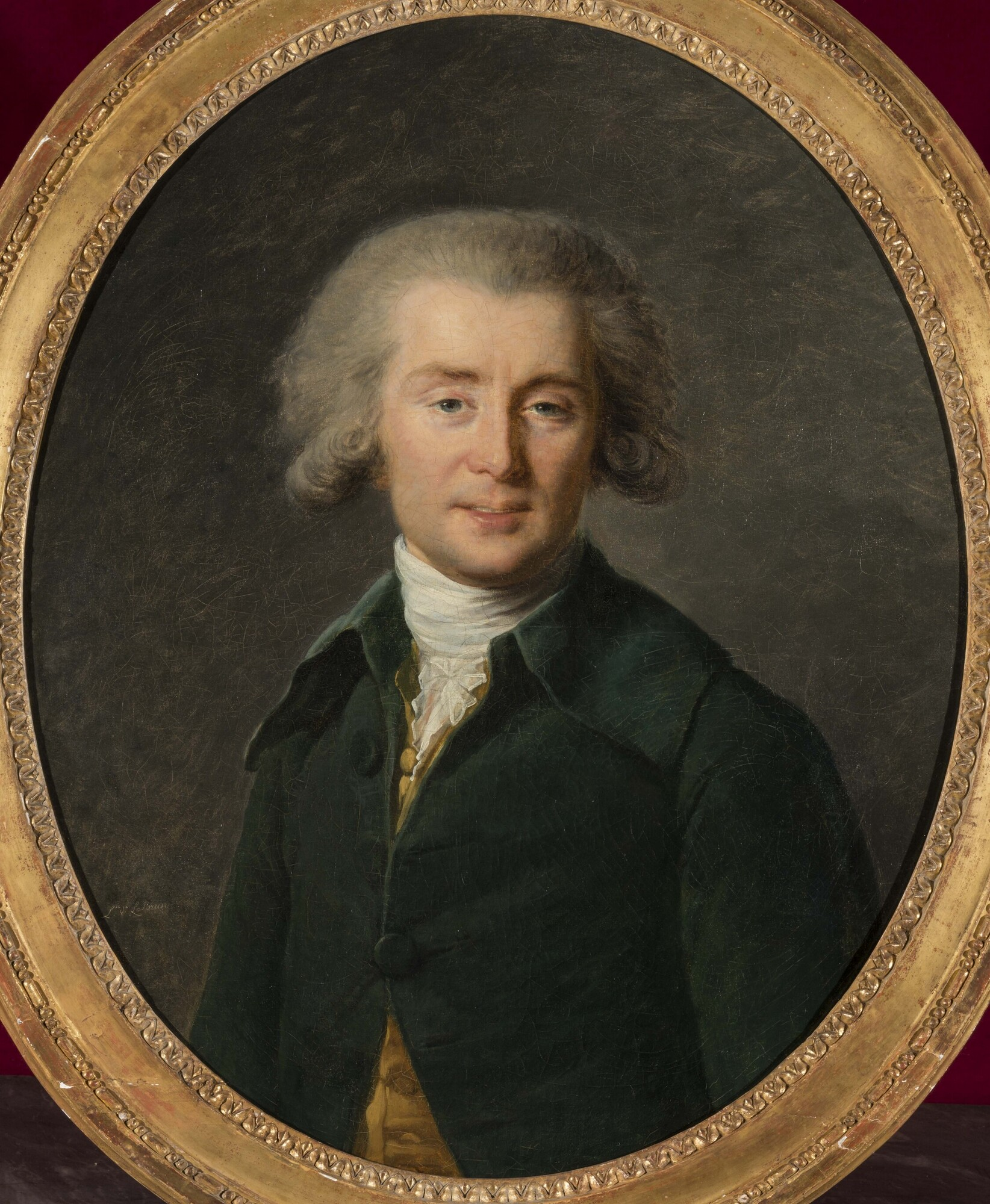
Portrait by Vigée Le Brun, 1785

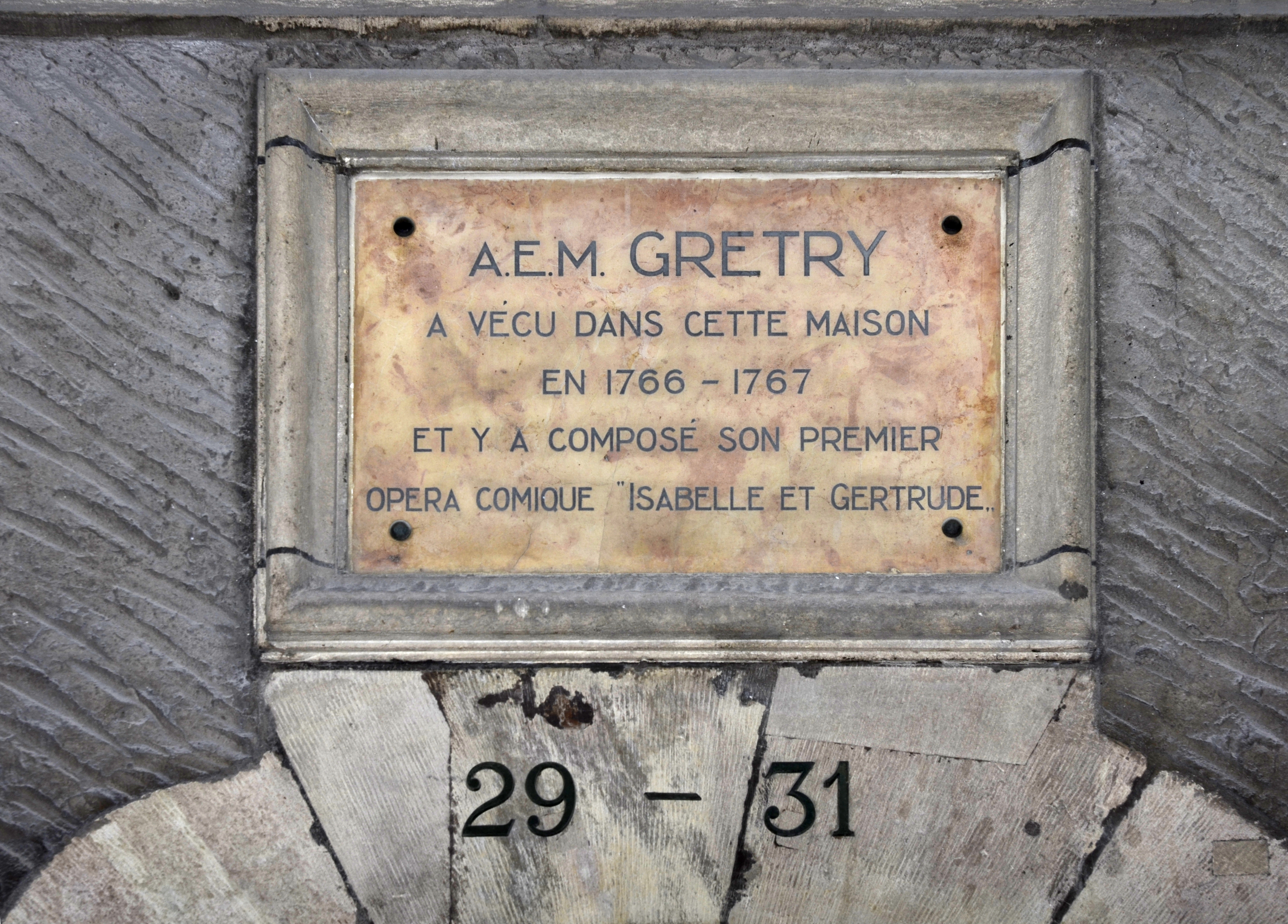
Plaque in memory of André Grétry, 29-31 Grand Rue, Geneva.

André Ernest Modeste Grétry (French: [gʁɛtʁi]; baptised 11 February 1741; died 24 September 1813) was a composer from the Prince-Bishopric of Liège (present-day Belgium), who worked from 1767 onwards in France and took French nationality. He is most famous for his opéras comiques. His music influenced Mozart and Beethoven, and both of whom wrote variations on his works.

== Biography ==
He was born at Liège, his father being a poor musician. He was a choirboy at the church of St. Denis (Liège). In 1753 he became a pupil of Jean-Pantaléon Leclerc and later of the organist at St-Pierre de Liège, Nicolas Rennekin, for keyboard and composition and of Henri Moreau, music master at the collegiate church of St. Paul. But of greater importance was the practical tuition he received by attending the performances of an Italian opera company. Here he heard the operas of Baldassarre Galuppi, Giovanni Battista Pergolesi, and other masters; and the desire of completing his own studies in Italy was the immediate result. To find the necessary means he composed in 1759 a mass which he dedicated to the canons of the Liège Cathedral, and it was at the expense of Canon Hurley that he went to Italy in March 1759. In Rome he went to the Collège de Liège. Here Grétry resided for five years, studiously employed in completing his musical education under Giovanni Battista Casali. His proficiency in harmony and counterpoint was, however, according to his own confession, at all times very moderate.

His first great success was achieved by La vendemmiatrice, an Italian intermezzo or operetta, composed for the Aliberti theatre in Rome and received with universal applause. It is said that the study of the score of one of Pierre-Alexandre Monsigny's operas, lent to him by a secretary of the French embassy in Rome, decided Grétry to devote himself to French comic opera. On New Year's Day 1767 he accordingly left Rome, and after a short stay at Geneva (where he made the acquaintance of Voltaire, and produced another operetta) went to Paris.

There for two years he had to contend with the difficulties attendant on poverty and obscurity. He was, however, not without friends, and by the intercession of Count Gustaf Philip Creutz, the Swedish ambassador, Grétry obtained a libretto from Jean-François Marmontel, which he set to music in less than six weeks, and which, on its performance in August 1768, met with unparalleled success. The name of the opera was Le Huron. Two others, Lucile and Le tableau parlant, soon followed, and thenceforth Grétry's position as the leading composer of comic opera was safely established.

Altogether he composed some fifty operas. His masterpieces are Zémire et Azor and Richard Coeur-de-lion—the first produced in 1771, the second in 1784. The latter in an indirect way became connected with a great historic event. In it occurs the celebrated romance, O Richard, O mon Roi, l'univers t'abandonne, which was sung at the banquet – "fatal as that of Thyestes," remarks Carlyle – given by the bodyguard to the officers of the Versailles garrison on 3 October 1789. La Marseillaise not long afterwards became the reply of the people to the expression of loyalty borrowed from Grétry's opera. Richard Cœur de Lion was translated and adapted for the English stage by John Burgoyne.

Grétry was the first to write for the "tuba curva", an instrument that existed from Roman times as the cornu. He used the tuba curva in music that he composed for the funeral of Voltaire. His opera-ballet La caravane du Caire, with modest turquerie exoticism in harp and triangle accompaniment, is a rescue adventure along the lines of Die Entführung aus dem Serail; premiered at Fontainebleau in 1783, it remained in the French repertory for fifty years.

Grétry also made use of the mandolin in his compositions. Philip J. Bone speculated that Grétry was exposed to the instrument while in Italy, and said "he makes use of it upon various occasions, in this instance with a telling and marked impression." This instance was the serenade While all are sleeping from Grétry's opera L'amant jaloux. Bone called the serenade "a delicate accompaniment for two mandolins".

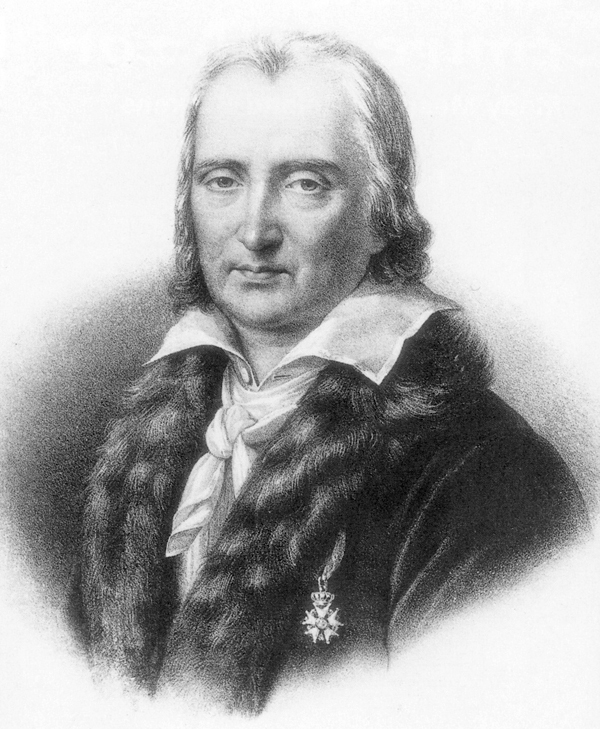
Grétry wearing his medal from the Légion d'honneur

The composer himself was influenced by the great events he witnessed, and the titles of some of his operas, such as La rosière républicaine and La fête de la raison, sufficiently indicate the epoch to which they belong; but they are mere pièces de circonstance, and the republican enthusiasm displayed is not genuine. Little more successful was Grétry in his dealings with classical subjects. His genuine power lay in the delineation of character and in the expression of tender and typically French sentiment. The structure of his concerted pieces on the other hand is frequently flimsy, and his instrumentation so feeble that the orchestral parts of some of his works had to be rewritten by other composers, in order to make them acceptable to modern audiences. During the Revolution Grétry lost much of his property, but the successive governments of France vied in favouring the composer, regardless of political differences. From the old court he received distinctions and rewards of all kinds; the republic made him an inspector of the conservatoire; Napoleon granted him the cross of the legion of honour and a pension.

Grétry took students in opera composition, including his daughter Lucile and Caroline Wuiet. He died at the Hermitage in Montmorency, formerly the house of Rousseau. Fifteen years after his death Grétry's heart was transferred to his birthplace, permission having been obtained after a protracted lawsuit. In 1842 a large bronze statue of the composer was set up at Liège. His heart remains in it, while his body is buried in Paris at the Père Lachaise Cemetery.

During his life, a commemorative statue was made of him by Jean-Baptiste Stouf. It was commissioned in 1804 by Hippolyte, comte de Livry, and placed in the Opéra Comique in 1809. It is now in the Metropolitan Museum of Art, New York.

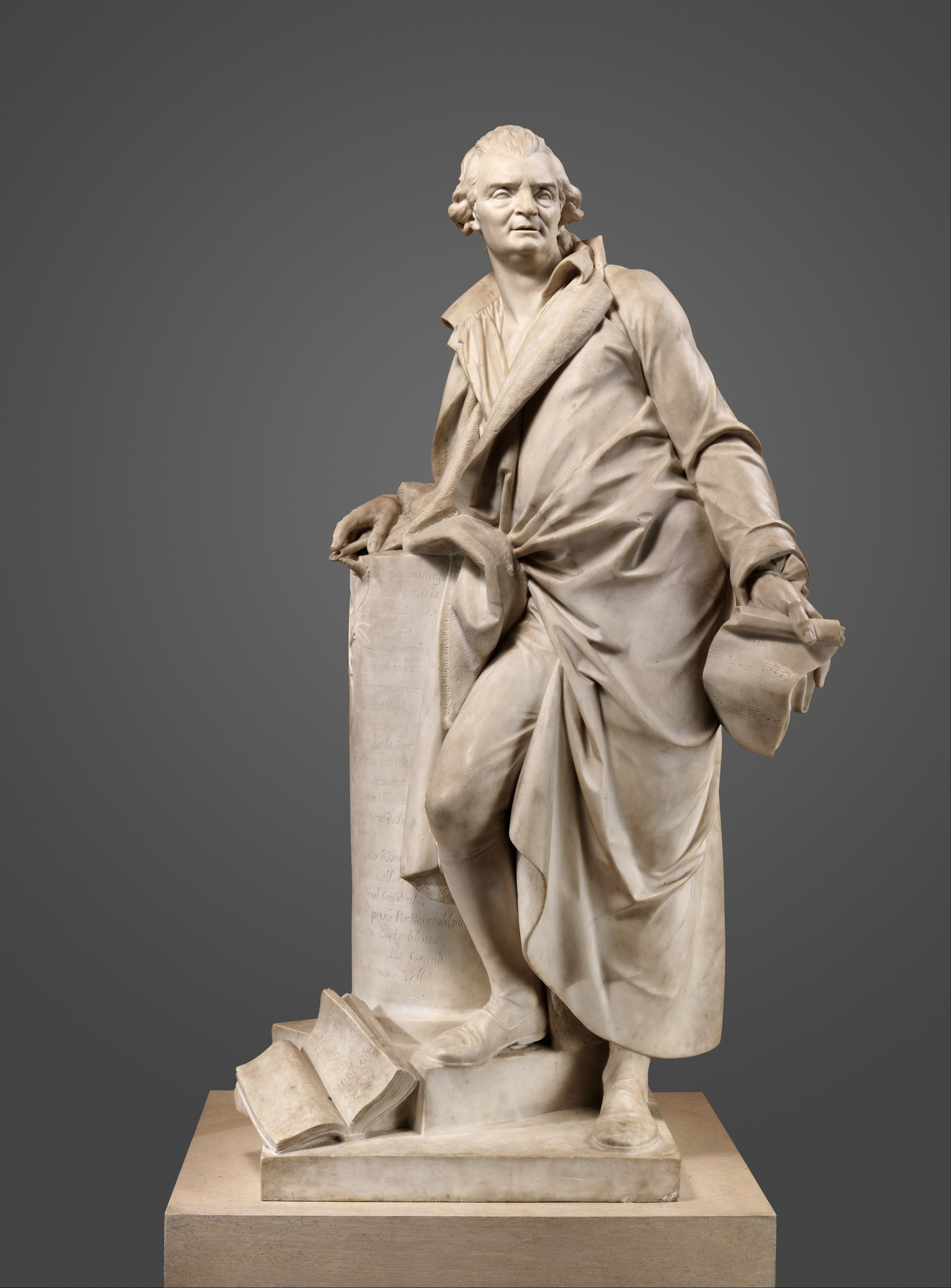
Statue of Grétry (1804–08), marble, by Jean-Baptiste Stouf (1742–1826), Metropolitan Museum of Art, New York

Grétry was married to the painter Jeanne-Marie Grandon.
