= Ludovic (opera) =

Opéra comique in two acts

- Opéra comique by: Ferdinand Hérold (unfinished); Fromental Halévy (completed)
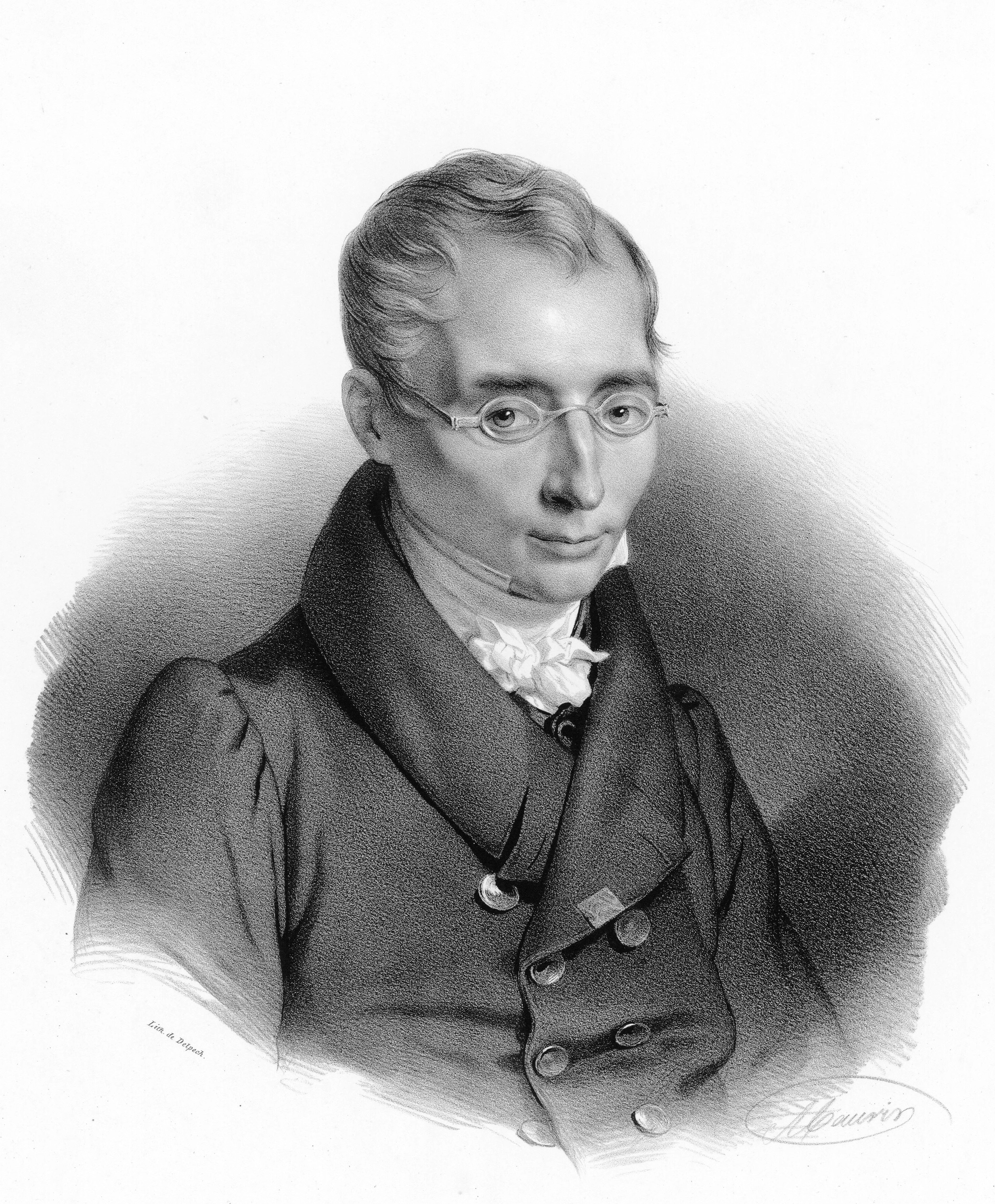
- Ferdinand Hérold
- Librettist: Jules-Henri Vernoy de Saint-Georges
- Language: French
- Premiere: 16 May 1833; Salle de la Bourse, Opéra-Comique, Paris

Ludovic is an opéra comique in two acts to a French-language libretto by Jules-Henri Vernoy de Saint-Georges. The music, by Ferdinand Hérold, was left unfinished at his death, and the work was completed by his deputy at the Opéra-Comique, Fromental Halévy. Hérold had only written the overture, four numbers and the beginning of the act 1 finale.

The plot, elements of which were later reworked by Halévy and Saint-Georges in the opera Le val d'Andorre (1847), centres on misplaced alliance, love, forced conscription, flight, pardon, and marriage.

Chopin wrote a set of variations in B-flat major, Variations brillantes, Op. 12 (1833), on the act 1 aria "Je vends des scapulaires" (I sell scapulars).

== Performance history ==
The opera was premiered by the Paris Opéra-Comique at the Salle de la Bourse on 16 May 1833, five months after Hérold's death. It achieved 70 performances by the end of 1834, making it a modest success, which set the foundation for Halévy's career.

== Roles ==
Roles, voice types, premiere cast
| Role | Voice type | Premiere cast, 16 May 1833 |
|---|---|---|
| Ludovic | tenor | Louis-Augustin Lemonnier |
| Nice | soprano | Marie Massy |
| Gregorio | baritone | Vizentini |
| Francesca | soprano | Félicité Pradher |
| Scipion | bass | |
Male and female farmers, soldiers

== Synopsis ==
Place: Francesca's farm, the village of Albano, near Rome

The main characters are Ludovic, a farmer from Corsica; Francesca, who owns the farm he manages; and her cousin Gregorio. When Francesca is about to marry Gregorio, Ludovic shoots her and is sentenced to death. Francesca recovers and realizes she loves Ludovic.
