= Clara Jecks =

English musical comedy performer

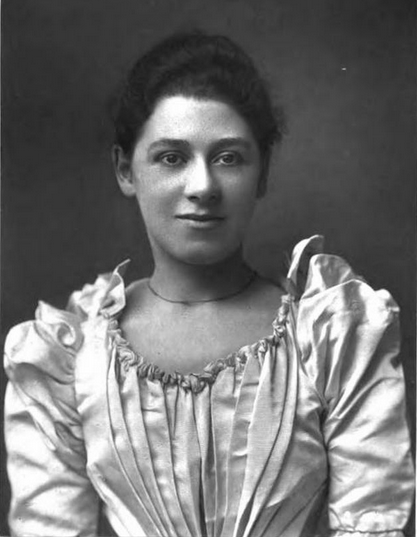
Clara Jecks, from an 1896 publication.

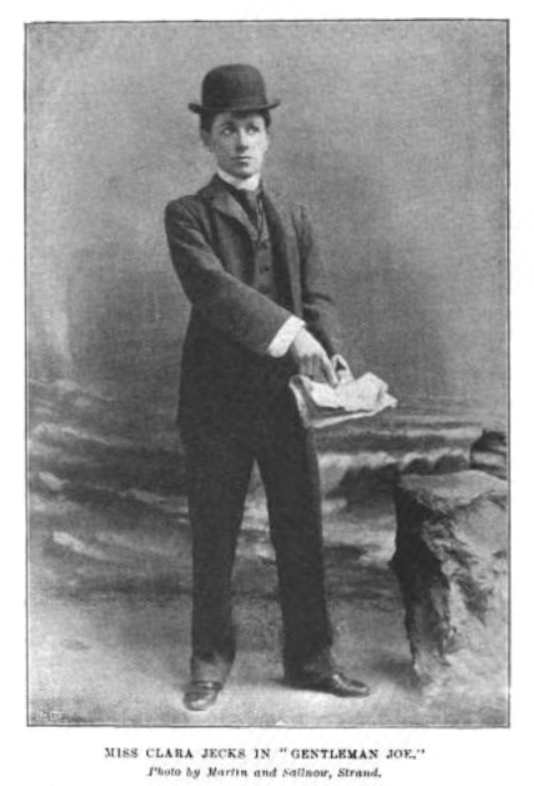
Clara Jecks, in costume as a young man, from an 1895 publication

Clara Jecks (22 September 1854 – 5 January 1951) was an English musical comedy performer, best known for soubrette and boy roles.

== Early life ==
Clara Marie Jecks was born in St Luke's, London, the daughter of Charles Jecks and Harriet Martha Coveney. Her father was an actor and theatrical manager, and her mother was an actress. She began appearing on the stage from a very early age, and was trained for a career in entertainment.

== Career ==
Jecks specialised in soubrette and boy roles, saying "I am never so really happy as when acting a lad." She made her first professional appearance on the London stage in 1873, in the show Kissi Kissi. She toured with her mother in the Comedy Opera Company in 1878 in several roles, in The Sorcerer, Trial by Jury, and Breaking the Spell. Other of her many stage appearances included Formosa (1877), Maid of Croissey (1880), The Sleepwalker (1893), The Black Domino (1893), The Middy Ashore, The Member for Slocum, Stage Struck, Santa Claus, Gentleman Joe (1895), A Merry Madcap (1896), Cinderella (1893-1894), Harlequinade and Justice Nell (1900), and her final London appearance, in The Critic (1911).

== Personal life ==
Jecks married at age 47. Her cousin Reginald Jecks was also a performer. Jecks died in Highgate in 1951, aged 96 years.
