= Éric Huchet =

French contemporary lyric tenor (born 1962)

Éric Huchet is a French contemporary lyric tenor.

== Musical studies ==
- First prize of the Conservatoire à rayonnement régional de Paris in 1992.
- University of Music and Performing Arts Vienna in Walter Berry's class

== Roles ==
- Achille, Menelas in Offenbach's La Belle Hélène, Théâtre du Châtelet, 2000, Marseille.
- Le Prince Paul in Offenbach's La Grande-Duchesse de Gérolstein, Théâtre du Châtelet, 2004.
- Cochenille in Offenbach's The Tales of Hoffmann, Grand Théâtre de Genève, 2008.
- Falsacappa in Offenbach's Les Brigands, Opéra-Comique of Paris, 2011.
- Graf Elemer in Strauss's Arabella, Paris Opera, July 2012.
- Trufaldino in Sergei Prokofiev's The Love for Three Oranges, Paris Opera 2012
- Franz in Offenbach's The Tales of Hoffmann, Paris Opera, September 2012.
- Monostatos in Mozart's The Magic Flute, Angers-Nantes Opéra, May 2014.
- Spoletta in Puccini Tosca. Paris Opera, November 2014
- Cantarelli in Hérold's Le pré aux clercs. Opera-comique, Paris 2015
