= Le pré aux clercs =

Opéra comique by Ferdinand Hérold

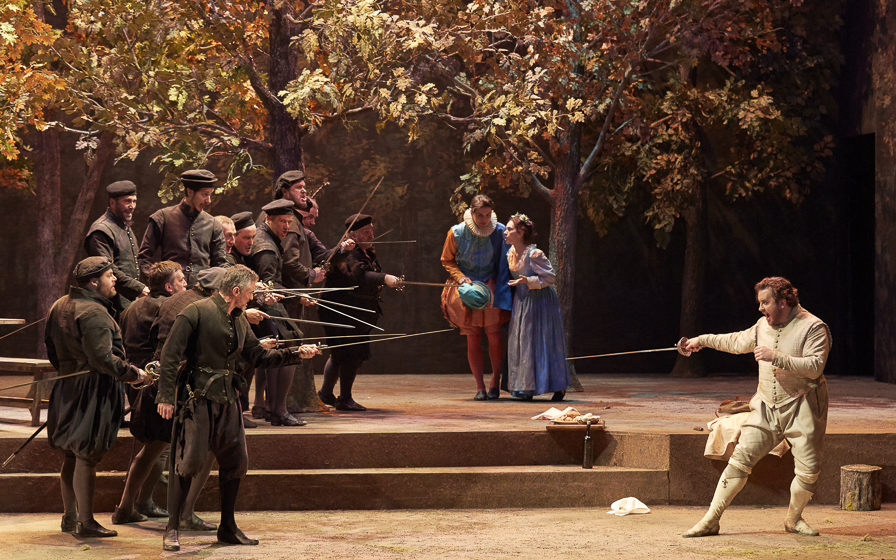
2015 production, Opéra-Comique, Paris

Le pré aux clercs (French pronunciation: [lə pʁe o klɛʁ], The Clerks' Meadow) is an opéra comique in three acts by Ferdinand Hérold with a libretto by François-Antoine-Eugène de Planard based on Prosper Mérimée's Chronique du temps de Charles IX of 1829.

== Performance history ==
Le pré aux clercs was premiered in Paris by the Opéra-Comique company at the Salle de la Bourse on 15 December 1832. After the first performance the leading lady, Madame Casimir, refused – after unsuccessfully demanding more money – to sing in the subsequent performances, and Mlle Dorus of the Opéra was coached by Hérold over five days to take over the role of Isabelle. According to Hérold's biographer Arthur Pougin, this incident exacerbated the composer's ill-health, leading to his death five weeks after the premiere.

The opera, Hérold's last completed one, was very successful, inaugurating the new Salle Favart in 1840, and enjoying some 1,000 performances up to 1871, and reaching its 1,600th at the Opéra-Comique by 1949.

Though rarely performed in recent years, a studio production conducted by José Serebrier was broadcast by BBC Radio 3 in 1987, with Carole Farley and John Aler among the cast.

The opera was performed at the Paris Opéra-Comique in March 2015, directed by Éric Ruf, with the Gulbenkian Orchestra conducted by Paul McCreesh, in a co-production with the Wexford Festival Opera, where it was conducted by Jean-Luc Tingaud as part of the 2015 festival, and subsequently broadcast on BBC Radio 3.

== Roles ==
Role	Voice type	Premiere Cast, 15 December 1832 (Conductor:Henri Valentino)
Marguerite de Valois	soprano	Marie-Sophie Carrault-Ponchard
Isabelle Montal (a young Béarnaise countess)	soprano	Alphonsine-Virginie-Marie Dubois ('Mme. Casimir')
Nicette (betrothed to Girot)	soprano	Marie Massy
Baron de Mergy	tenor	Étienne-Bernard-Auguste Thénard
Comte de Comminges	tenor	Louis-Augustin Lemonnier
Cantarelli	tenor	Louis Féréol
Girot (host of the 'Pré aux clercs')	baritone	Fargueil
Un exempt du guet (detective)	bass	Génot
Three archers		
An officer		
Chorus: Guards, officers, light horsemen, courtiers, archers, masques, people, dancers.

== Synopsis ==
The action takes place in Étampes, then in Paris at the Palais du Louvre and the grounds of the 'Pré aux clercs', in 1582.

=== Act 1 ===
The opera opens at Nicette’s country inn where festivities anticipate the wedding of Nicette (the god-daughter of Marguerite) and Girot, the host of the famous Pré-aux-Clercs in Paris – known both for lovers’ rendez-vous and for duels. Marguerite, wife of Henry IV, king of Navarre, and sister to Henry III, king of France, while detained at the Louvre as a hostage of peace between the two sovereigns, has been accompanied by Isabelle de Montal, a Béarnaise countess. The King of Navarre sends as envoy the Baron de Mergy, a young Béarnaise gentleman, to recall his Queen and her lady-in-waiting Isabelle. Resting after his arrival at Étampes, near Paris, Mergy meets Cantarelli, an Italian, the director of the court festivities and deportment tutor to Isabelle, who informs Mergy of the news from the court concerning Isabelle. The rough swordsman Comminge, a colonel and royal favourite also arrives, angry at having been kept away from the royal hunt by a challenge to a duel from a young man, whom he had killed. Next Marguerite and Isabelle, having been with the royal hunting party in the forest, come to visit Nicette. The Queen expresses her concerns for Isabelle's unhappiness and rejection of suitors at court. Isabelle responds that she wishes to return home; Marguerite however informs her of the plans to marry Isabelle to Comminge. When Isabelle reacts to this news, Mergy comes to her and the lovers embrace; their emotion causes suspicion in Comminge, to whom Mergy is introduced as Henri III's messenger. Marguerite invites Nicette to the Louvre to claim her dowry.

=== Act 2 ===
Isabelle sings of her love for Mergy ("Jours de mon enfance"). Marguerite meanwhile is plotting with Nicette and Cantarelli to marry Isabelle to Mergy in secret and secure their flight to Navarre. The marriage is fixed to take place at the chapel of the Pré-aux-Clercs, simultaneously with that of Nicette and Girot. Cantarelli is blackmailed into assisting them by means of an incriminating letter. During the masked ball Cantarelli will bring Mergy to Marguerite’s chambers whence they will flee to a country church. However Comminge’s suspicions bring him to confront Cantarelli whom he threatens if he discovers a conspiracy to rob him of Isabelle. Comminge is misled by Cantarelli into believing the love intrigue is between Mergy and Marguerite. Now a message arrives refusing Isabelle’s departure with Marguerite – the countess must marry Comminge, and Mergy is ordered to return. Mergy, slighted by an offer from Comminge to assist him in meeting the Queen, challenges the colonel to a duel at dawn at the Pré-aux-Clercs. Nonetheless the curtain falls with some hope for the young lovers as Nicette informs Mergy that Marguerite is resolute in her plans for them to wed after Nicette and Girot.

=== Act 3 ===
The wedding festivities for Nicette and Girot are under way and at the chapel Mergy and Isabelle are secretly wed. Cantarelli arrives with passports for the pair’s escape then leaves to act as second for Comminge’s duel with Mergy. During the duel Comminge learns that it is Isabelle whom Mergy loves, not Marguerite, and the discovery that they are in fact wed makes the colonel even more furious. Comminge falls and his body is put on a boat to be taken to Chaillot to be received by the monks. Cantarelli comes to announce the result of the duel, as the boat passes, and all believe Mergy to be dead. However, the joy of his victory joins with that of the wedding celebration and Isabelle and Mergy flee to Navarre with Cantarelli as their guide.

== Recordings ==
A 2015 studio recording based on the Opéra-Comique production was released in 2016 on the Bru Zane label, with Marie Lenormand (Marguerite de Valois), Marie-Eve Munger (Isabelle Montal), Jeanne Crousaud (Nicette), Michael Spyres (Baron de Mergy), Emiliano Gonzalez Toro (Comte de Comminges), Éric Huchet (Cantarelli), Christian Helmer (Girot) and the Gulbenkian Orchestra and Chorus, conducted by Paul McCreesh.

A historic (1959) French studio recording was released on CD in 2017, with Denise Boursin (Isabella), Joseph Peyron (de Mergy), Berthe Monmart (Marguerite), Lucien Lovano (Girot), Claudine Collart (Nicette) and Gaston Rey (Contarelli) in the main roles, with the Chorus and Orchestra of RTF Paris, conducted by Robert Benedetti.

== Bibliography ==
- The Complete Dictionary of Opera and Operetta, James Anderson, (Wings Books, 1993) ISBN 0-517-09156-9
- Casaglia, Gherardo (2005)."Le pré aux clercs, 15 December 1832". L'Almanacco di Gherardo Casaglia (in Italian).
- Chouquet, Gustave (1889). "Valentino, Henri Justin Armand Joseph", vol. 4, p. 214, in A Dictionary of Music and Musicians, 4 volumes. London: Macmillan.
- Pougin, Arthur (1880). "Valentino (Henri-Justin-Joseph)", pp. 597–598, in Biographie universelle des musiciens et Bibliographie générale de la musique par F.-J. Fétis. Supplément et complément, vol. 2. Paris: Firmin-Didot. View at Google Books.
