= Zampa =

Opéra comique by Louis Hérold

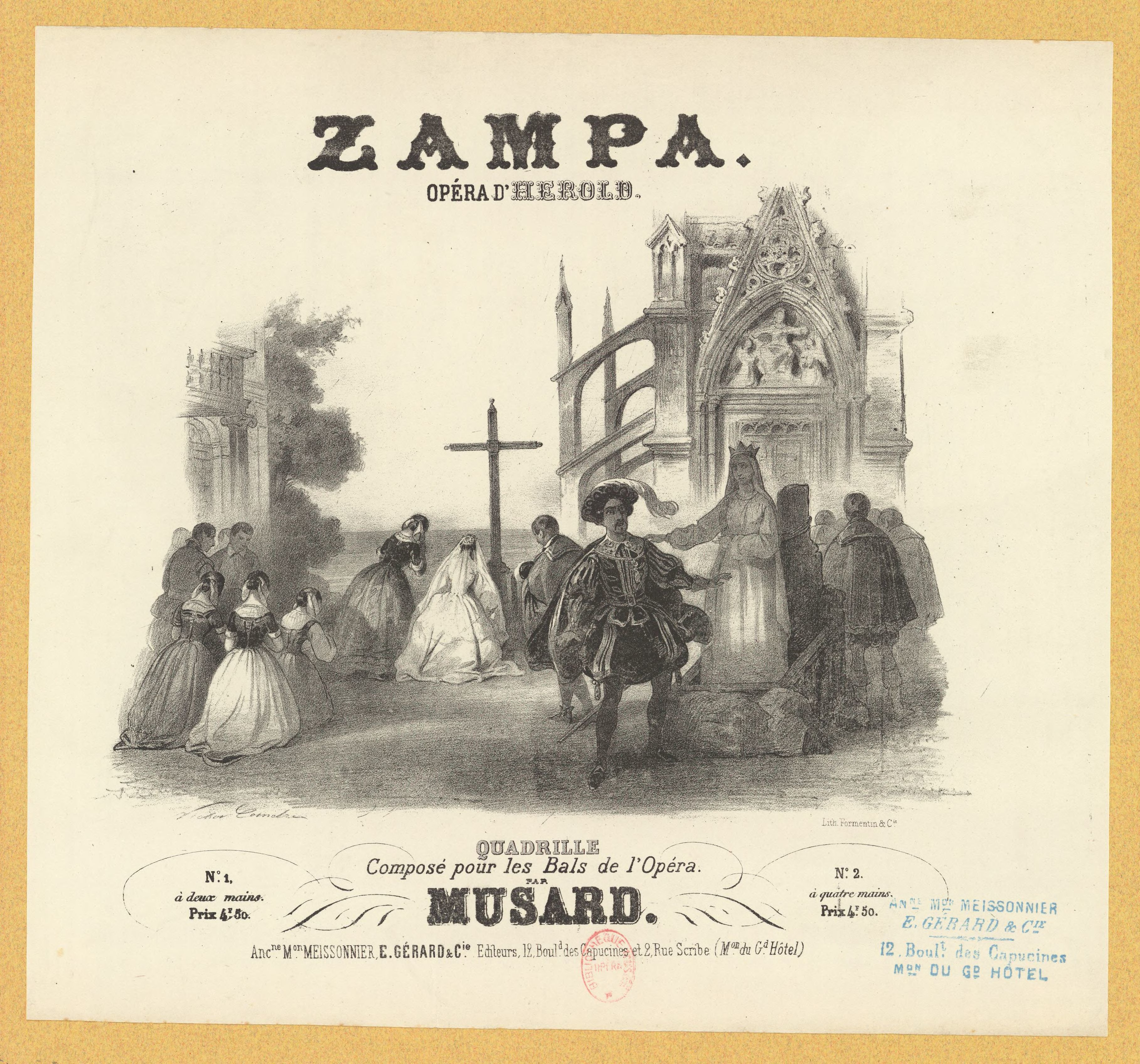
A scene from Hérold's Zampa

Zampa, ou La fiancée de marbre (Zampa, or the Marble Bride) is an opéra comique in three acts by French composer Ferdinand Hérold, with a libretto by Mélesville.

The overture to the opera is one of Hérold's most famous works and is a staple of orchestral repertoire.

== Performance history ==
Zampa was first performed in Paris on 3 May 1831 at the Opéra-Comique (Salle Ventadour), where it became popular, achieving 500 performances by 1877. In the 20th century however, it faded from the repertoire. It was also popular in Germany and Italy; in the latter the spoken dialogue was replaced by recitatives. It was first performed in the United States on 16 February 1833 at the Théâtre d'Orléans in New Orleans, and in the United Kingdom on 19 April 1833 at the King's Theatre in London.

The opera was revived at the Opéra-Comique in March 2008 under William Christie in a production by Macha Makeïeff and Jérôme Deschamps.

== Roles ==
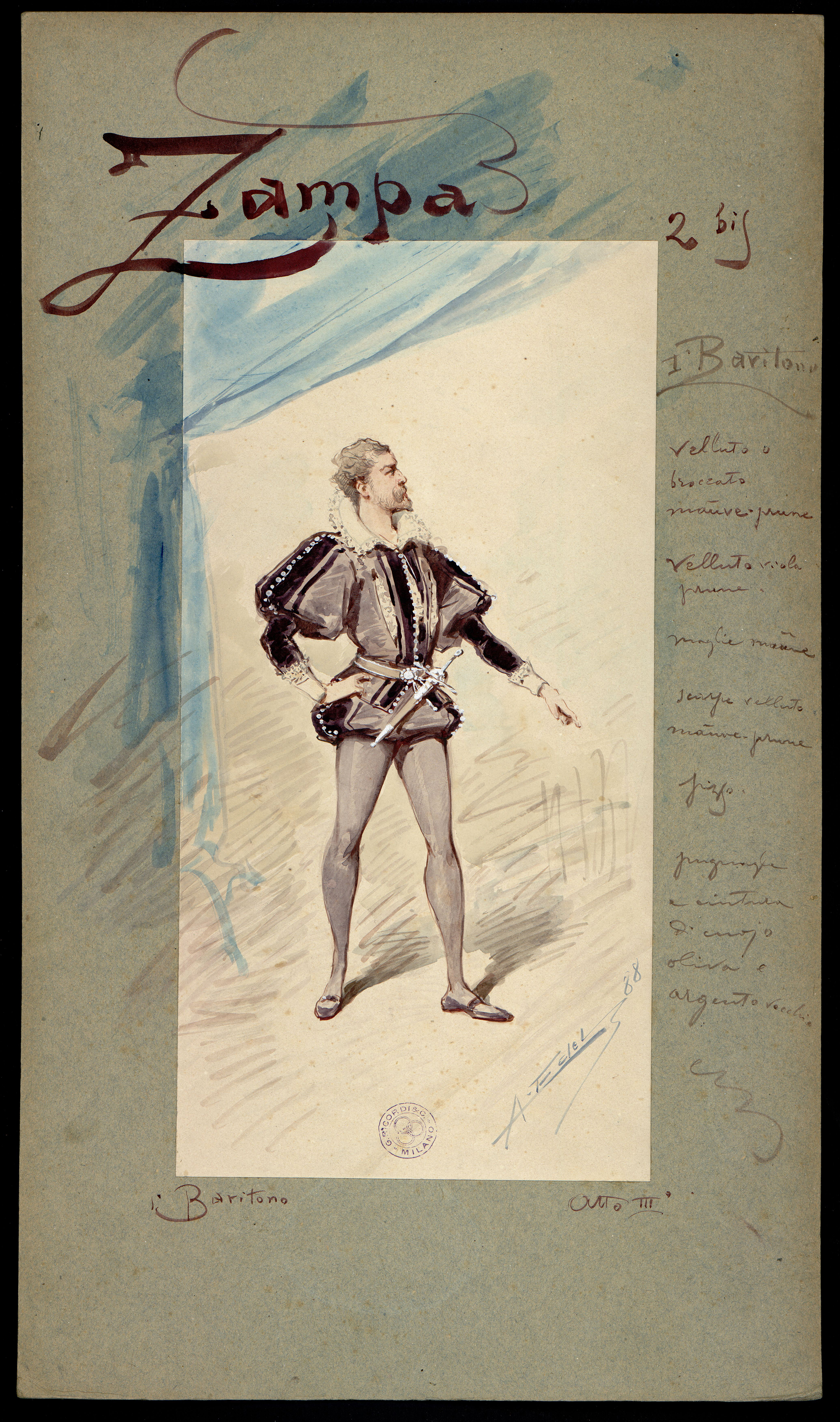
Zampa, costume design for Zampa act 3 (1888).

Role	Voice type	Premiere Cast, 3 May 1831 (Conductor: Henri Valentino)
Zampa, a pirate	tenor	Jean Baptiste Marie Chollet
Alphonse de Monza	tenor	Moreau-Sainti
Camille, Alphonse's fiancée	soprano	Casimir
Daniel	tenor	Féréol
Ritta	mezzo-soprano	Boulanger
Dandolo	tenor	Juliet

== Instrumentation ==
The opera is scored for two flutes (first doubling piccolo), two oboes, two clarinets, two bassoons, four horns, two trumpets, three trombones, ophicleide, timpani, triangle, bass drum, cymbals, snare drum, bell, harp and strings.

== Synopsis ==
Time: 1590.

Place: Casa Lugano, in southwestern Italy.

The young Count of Monza, having dissipated the family fortune and seduced then deserted Alice Manfredi, went off to sea to become a pirate. He adopted the name Zampa. Alice Manfredi, roaming in search of her treacherous lover, was taken in and sheltered by Lugano, a wealthy merchant. Alice died shortly thereafter, of a broken heart; and Lugano caused a marble statue of her to be erected in his palace. This statue is venerated by the local people as a saint.

=== Act 1 ===
In a castle in Sicily, Camille, Lugano's daughter, is preparing to marry Alphonse, the younger son of the Monza family, who has never met his elder brother. Just then Zampa arrives on the scene, in disguise. He is thought by everyone to be in an English prison awaiting execution; but in reality he has escaped, and he has just captured Lugano. Now he has arrived at the palace to demand a ransom for Lugano's release.

Zampa is smitten by Camille's beauty and so, in addition, he demands her for himself as the price for Lugano's life. In order to save her father, Camille is thus forced to break her engagement to Alphonse, who is removed from the scene when he, too, is captured by the pirates. Zampa is then joined by his pirates. They take possession of the palace and order Dandolo, the castle steward, to prepare rooms and bring wine for them all. During the ensuing feast Daniel, Zampa's first mate, notices the statue of Alice. For a joke, Zampa places a ring on the marble Alice's finger and declares her his fiancée for the night. However, when he tries to remove the ring, the statue's hand closes — to the terror of all except Zampa.

=== Act 2 ===
The following day, Zampa is leading Camille to the altar when — on the very threshold of the chapel — the statue of Alice appears and threatens Zampa. Again, Zampa refuses to be alarmed by the statue. Now Camille's companion Ritta comes on the scene; she is perplexed about two things: first, that Camille is, although apparently unwillingly, about to marry a stranger; and second, that neither the bride's father Lugano nor Alphonse is there. Then Ritta spots Daniel, her supposedly dead husband; this places her in a quandary, because the (much more attractive prospect) Dandolo has been courting her.

The comic sub-plot of this trio continues to weave its way through the rest of the story. Alphonse appears, having made good his escape from the pirates, and recognises Zampa as the pirate chief. As he is in the throes of denouncing Zampa to the assembled company, a pardon arrives from the viceroy: Zampa is to be given his freedom on condition that he and his men go to fight the Turks. All this notwithstanding, the ceremony goes ahead: Zampa and the heartbroken Camille are married.

=== Act 3 ===
In despair, Alphonse comes at night to bid farewell to the desolate Camille. Alphonse decides to kill Zampa, but he suddenly realizes that Zampa is in fact his long-lost elder brother, and that consequently he is unable to kill him. He leaves Camille's room.

Zampa and Camille are finally alone together. However, in the final fatal twist of the story, just as Zampa goes to take Camille in his arms, the statue of Alice Manfredi appears again between the couple, and as Mount Etna erupts, drags Zampa down to hell.

== Notes ==
Notes

== Bibliography ==
- Chouquet, Gustave (1889). "Valentino, Henri Justin Armand Joseph", vol. 4, p. 214, in A Dictionary of Music and Musicians, 4 volumes. London: Macmillan.
- The Viking Opera Guide, ed. Amanda Holden with Nicholas Kenyon and Stephen Walsh, Viking (1993) ISBN 0-670-81292-7
- Pougin, Arthur (1880). "Valentino (Henri-Justin-Joseph)", pp. 597–598, in Biographie universelle des musiciens et Bibliographie générale de la musique par F.-J. Fétis. Supplément et complément, vol. 2. Paris: Firmin-Didot. View at Google Books.
- The libretto/score of the English version by Jean and Christopher Shaw
- The Oxford Dictionary of Opera, by John Warrack and Ewan West (1992), pp. 782 ISBN 0-19-869164-5
