= Salle Ventadour =

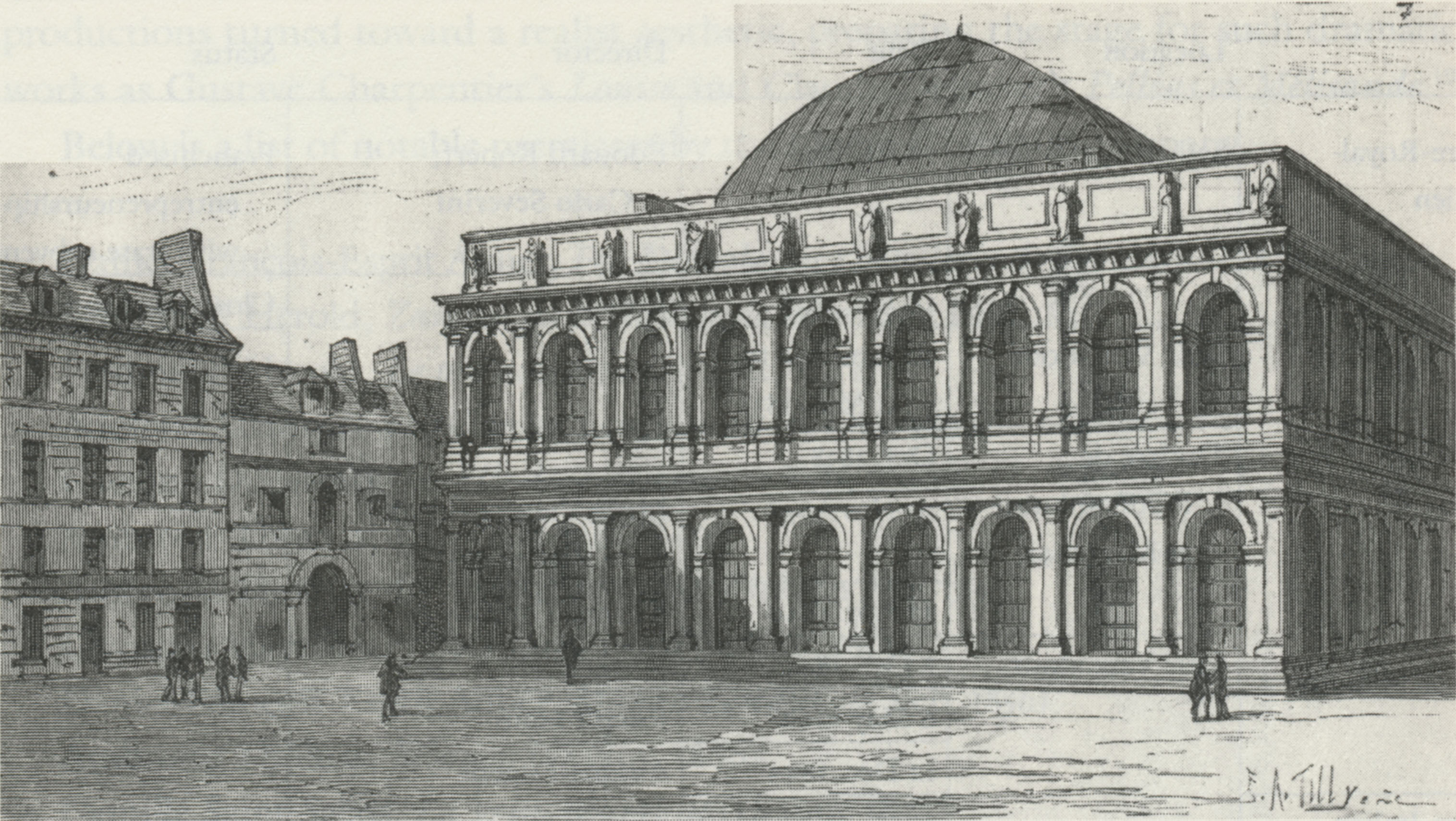
- The Salle Ventadour as an opera house in the mid 19th century.
- Interactive map of the Salle Ventadour area
- Alternative names: Opéra-Comique (1829–32); Théâtre Nautique (1834–35); Théâtre-Italien (1838); Théâtre de la Renaissance (1838–1841, 1868); Théâtre-Italien (1841–1878)

General information
- Type: opera house offices (after 1878)
- Location: rue Méhul; 2nd arrondissement of Paris
- Coordinates: 48.8677°N 2.33485°E
- Current tenants: Banque de France
- Construction started: 1826
- Inaugurated: 20 April 1829
- Cost: 4,620,000 francs

Design and construction
- Architect: Jacques-Marie Huvé
- Other designers: de Guerchy

The Salle Ventadour (French pronunciation: [sal vɑ̃taduʁ]), a former Parisian theatre in the rue Neuve-Ventadour, now the rue Méhul (2nd arrondissement of Paris), was built between 1826 and 1829 for the Opéra-Comique, to designs by Jacques-Marie Huvé, a prominent architect. The original theatre had a capacity of 1,106, but was subsequently taken over by the Théâtre-Italien and expanded to a capacity of 1,295 in 1841, thereafter becoming perhaps most noteworthy as the theatre in which the majority of the operas of the Italian composer Giuseppe Verdi were first performed in France. When the Théâtre-Italien company went out of business in 1878, the theatre was converted to offices.

== Opéra-Comique ==
The Opéra-Comique first performed at the Salle Ventadour on 20 April 1829. The opening night audience was a distinguished one and found the new theatre luxurious and comfortable. The program included the one-act opera Les deux mousquetaires by Henri Montan Berton, the overture to Étienne Méhul's opera Le jeune Henri, and the three-act opera La fiancée with music by Daniel Auber and a libretto by Eugène Scribe. The Opéra-Comique presented 32 premieres during its time at the Salle Ventadour, including one of François-Adrien Boieldieu's last operas Les deux nuits on 20 May 1829, Auber's Fra Diavolo (as L'hôtellerie de Terracine) on 28 January 1830, and Ferdinand Hérold's Zampa on 3 May 1831. After 22 March 1832 the Opéra-Comique left the Salle Ventadour and moved to the Salle de la Bourse, where it opened on 24 September 1832.

== Théâtre Nautique ==
The Salle Ventadour was reopened on 10 June 1834 as the Théâtre Nautique — "nautique" since some of the main attractions were works performed in a basin of water on the stage. The programs included the ballet-pantomime Les ondines, which was based on Fouqué's novella Undine, about a water sprite who marries a knight in order to save her soul, and used music from E. T. A. Hoffmann's opera of the same name; a full-length ballet William Tell with music by the German composer Jacques Strunz; a one-act ballet Le nouveau Robinson which also utilized the water; and a chinoiserie entitled Chao-Kang. These were interspersed with choruses by Carl Maria von Weber and others, sung by the members of a German company that was being formed in Paris at that time. The entr'acte was the overture to Weber's opera Oberon. The reviews were not good, and the size of the audience decreased over time.

Harriet Smithson, the Irish actress who had married the French composer Hector Berlioz on 3 October 1833, appeared with the Théâtre Nautique, opening on 22 November 1834 in a one-act pantomime put together by the resident choreographer Louis Henry. He called the concoction La derniére heure d'un condamné, and it used music by Cesare Pugni. The scenario took advantage of her talent for mad scenes: she had previously performed Ophelia in an English-language production of Shakespeare's Hamlet at the Théâtre de l'Odéon to great acclaim in 1827. The new piece was a pantomime, since Smithson's French was far from perfect (and remained so for the rest of her life). Unfortunately, this new performance was not as favorably received. Jules Janin, writing in the Journal des débats described it as consisting of "the two or three dozen contortions that are known as the art of mime" and complained that "they have cut Miss Smithson's tongue out". Berlioz anonymously wrote a positive review that appeared in the Gazette musicale but spent half of its time describing her previous appearance as Ophelia and the important influence it had had on the French style of acting. Not all the reviews were entirely negative: the English-language Galignani's Messenger praised Smithson, saying that the "single feature worth naming of this piece is the performance of Madame Berlioz, as the wife of the condamné, in which the agony and despair of such a situation is depicted with the fidelity and painful truth only within the reach of a perfect artiste." But apparently her performances were not enough to rescue the enterprise, and the Théâtre Nautique closed in 1835.

== A short visit by the Théâtre-Italien ==
The Salle Ventadour was used for a brief time by the Théâtre-Italien (30 January 1838 to 31 March 1838) after the destruction of the company's previous home, the Salle Favart, by fire on 15 January 1838. Only one opera new to Paris was presented, Gaetano Donizetti's Parisina. The company moved to the Odéon for three years before returning to the Salle Ventadour in 1841.

== Théâtre de la Renaissance ==
While the Théâtre-Italien company was at the Odéon, the Salle Ventadour was rented by Anténor Joly, who with the encouragement of the two great French romantic dramatists Victor Hugo and Alexandre Dumas, remodeled the theatre and renamed it the Théâtre de la Renaissance. Their aim was to bring together in one theatre the elitist and popular audiences of Paris. The new company opened on 8 November 1838 with the premiere of Hugo's drama Ruy Blas with Frédérick Lemaître in the title role. It ran for 48 performances. Two new plays by Dumas were also presented, Bathilde (14 January 1839) and L'alchimiste (10 April 1839), although these were less successful. The repertoire of the company was not limited to plays: Joly also mounted three new operas by Friedrich von Flotow, including Lady Melvil on 15 November 1838 (with some music also written by Albert Grisar and Sophie Anne Thillon as Lady Melvil), L'eau merveilleuse on 30 January 1839, and Le naufrage de la Méduse on 31 May 1839; and on 6 August 1839 the premiere of Donizetti's Lucie de Lammermoor, a French version of his Lucia di Lammermoor, with Thillon as Lucia and Achille Ricciardi as Edgardo. Joly's venture was short-lived however, closing on 16 May 1841.

== The Théâtre-Italien settles in ==
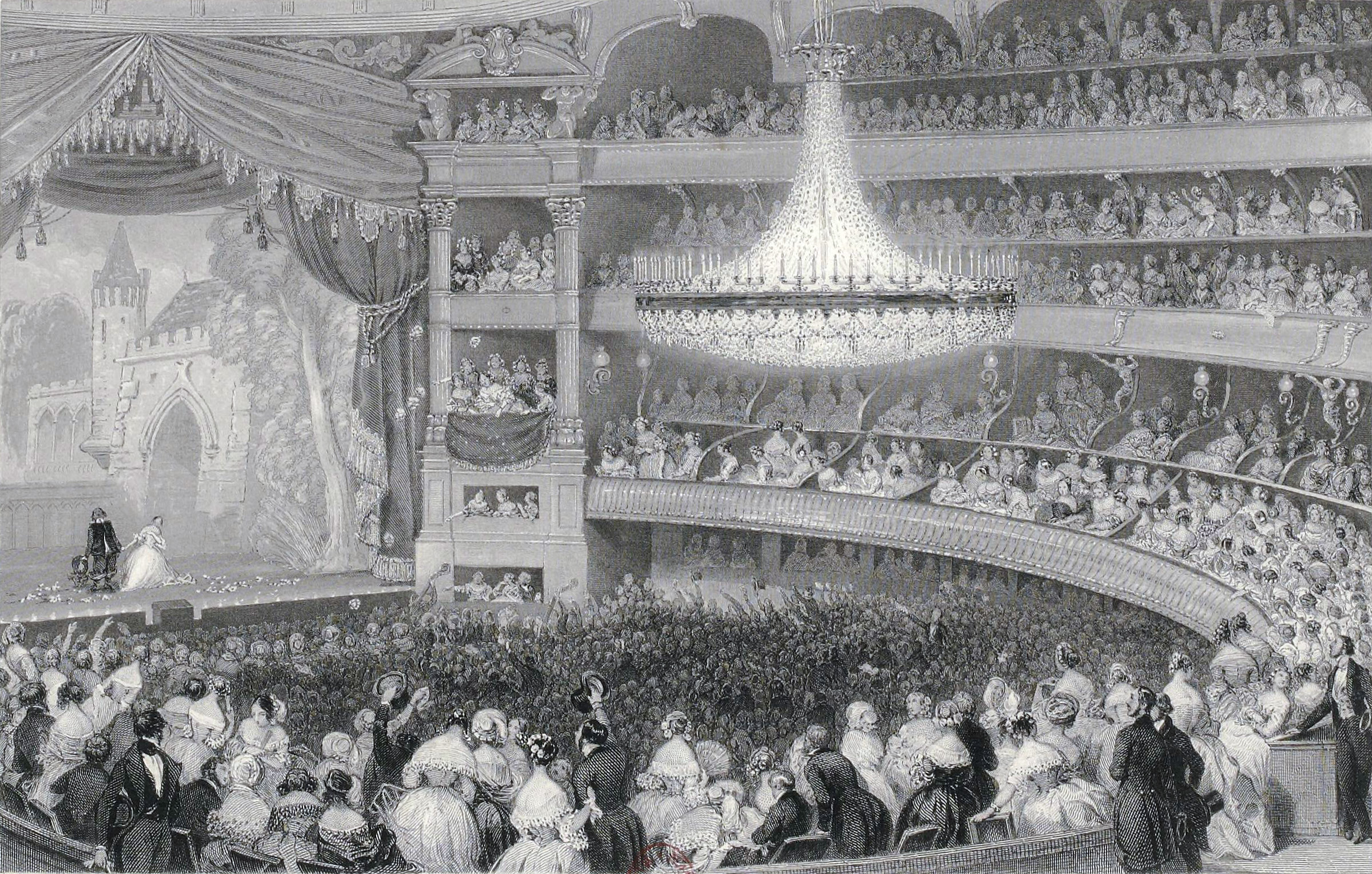
A performance by the Théâtre-Italien at the Salle Ventadour (c. 1842).

After the Théâtre de la Renaissance closed in 1841 the theater was expanded to a capacity of 1,294 and was again used by the Théâtre-Italien company from 2 October 1841 to 28 June 1878. During this time the company presented the premiere of Donizetti's Don Pasquale (3 January 1843) and the Paris premieres of 15 of Verdi's operas, including Nabucco (1845), Ernani (1846, as Il Proscritto), Il trovatore (23 December 1854), La traviata (6 December 1856), Rigoletto (19 January 1857), Un ballo in maschera (13 January 1861), and Aida (22 April 1876) with Verdi conducting. Among the important singers appearing in Verdi's operas were Giorgio Ronconi, Adelaide Borghi-Mamo, and Gaetano Fraschini. Verdi is reported to have referred to the Salle Ventadour as his favorite opera house in Paris.

Besides opera, the Salle Ventadour was also sometimes used for concerts. Giaocchino Rossini's Stabat Mater received its premiere there on 7 January 1842. Richard Wagner conducted three concerts devoted to his own music, including extracts from The Flying Dutchman, Tannhäuser, Tristan und Isolde, and Lohengrin, on 25 January, and 1 and 8 February 1860. Verdi conducted the Paris premiere of his Requiem on 30 May 1876.

The Théâtre-Italien shared the theater briefly, from 26 June to 4 July 1853, with the Opéra-Comique, and from 16 March 1868 to 5 May 1868 the theater was shared with a new company directed by Léon Carvalho, which was an extension of his Théâtre Lyrique on the Place du Châtelet. The name Théâtre de la Renaissance was revived for the use of Carvalho's venture, in order to distinguish it from the Théâtre-Italien. Carvalho had overextended himself, however, and soon went bankrupt. The Théâtre-Italien also shared the theater with the Paris Opéra from 19 January to December 1874 (in the period after the Opéra's Salle Le Peletier burned down on 28 October 1873 and before the opening of the Opéra's new Palais Garnier on 5 January 1875). Companies sharing the theatre usually performed on alternate nights.

At the instigation of the French tenor Victor Capoul the first professional public performance of the opera Les amants de Vérone with text and music by the marquis d'Ivry was mounted at the Salle Ventadour on 12 October 1878. The libretto follows Shakespeare's Romeo and Juliet more closely than that of the opera by Gounod, but the marquis d'Ivry's opera suffered in comparison. Capoul sang Romeo, and the Belgian soprano Marie Heilbronn sang Juliet. The same singers later appeared in a production at Covent Garden which was performed three times beginning on 24 May 1879. The text was considered "coarse", and the music received a lukewarm response.

After the Théâtre-Italien company went out of business in 1878, the Salle Ventadour was sold on 20 January 1879 and transformed into offices. The building has been primarily occupied by the Banque de France since 1893. Gustave Chouquet, writing in the 1900 edition of George Grove's Dictionary of Music and Musicians, described the renovated building as follows: "its pediment, still decorated with statues of the Muses, now bears the words 'Banque d'escompte de Paris,' a truly exasperating sight".
