= Ferdinand Hérold =

French composer (1791–1833)

Hérold, engraving after Louis Dupré

Louis Joseph Ferdinand Herold (Note: According to his biographer, Arthur Pougin, the composer's name is correctly spelled "Herold", with no acute accent. The Bibliothèque nationale de France uses that spelling, as does the city of Paris in the naming of the street containing the composer's birthplace. The current (2001) edition of Grove's Dictionary of Music and Musicians likewise follows Pougin's precept, but, as Pougin acknowledged, the spelling "Hérold" became customary: modern works of reference including Baker's Biographical Dictionary of Musicians, The International Encyclopedia of Dance, The Oxford Dictionary of Dance, The Oxford Dictionary of Music and The Oxford Companion to Music spell the name "Hérold".) (28 January 1791 – 19 January 1833), better known as Ferdinand Hérold (pronounced [fɛʁdinɑ̃ eʁɔld]), was a French composer. He was celebrated in his lifetime for his operas, of which he composed more than twenty, but he also wrote ballet music, works for piano and choral pieces. He is best known today for the ballet La Fille mal gardée and the overture to the opera Zampa.

Born in Paris to a musical family, Hérold trained at the Paris Conservatoire and won France's premier musical prize, the Prix de Rome in 1812. After a time in Italy he returned to Paris and worked first at the Théâtre Italien and then at the Opéra. He wrote several ballets for the latter, but was best known as a composer of opéra comique. Some of them, particularly in his early days, were hampered by poor librettos, but later he had more successes than failures, and his last two operas, Zampa (1831) and Le Pré aux clercs (The Clerk's Meadow, 1832) were immensely popular, and remained in the repertory in France and elsewhere for decades after his early death from tuberculosis in 1833.

As a ballet composer Hérold was a pioneer, raising the standard of ballet scores from being simple arrangements of popular tunes to well-orchestrated music illustrating the action of the ballets. His operas influenced later composers from Bizet and Offenbach to Wagner and Smetana.

== Life and career ==
=== Background and early years ===
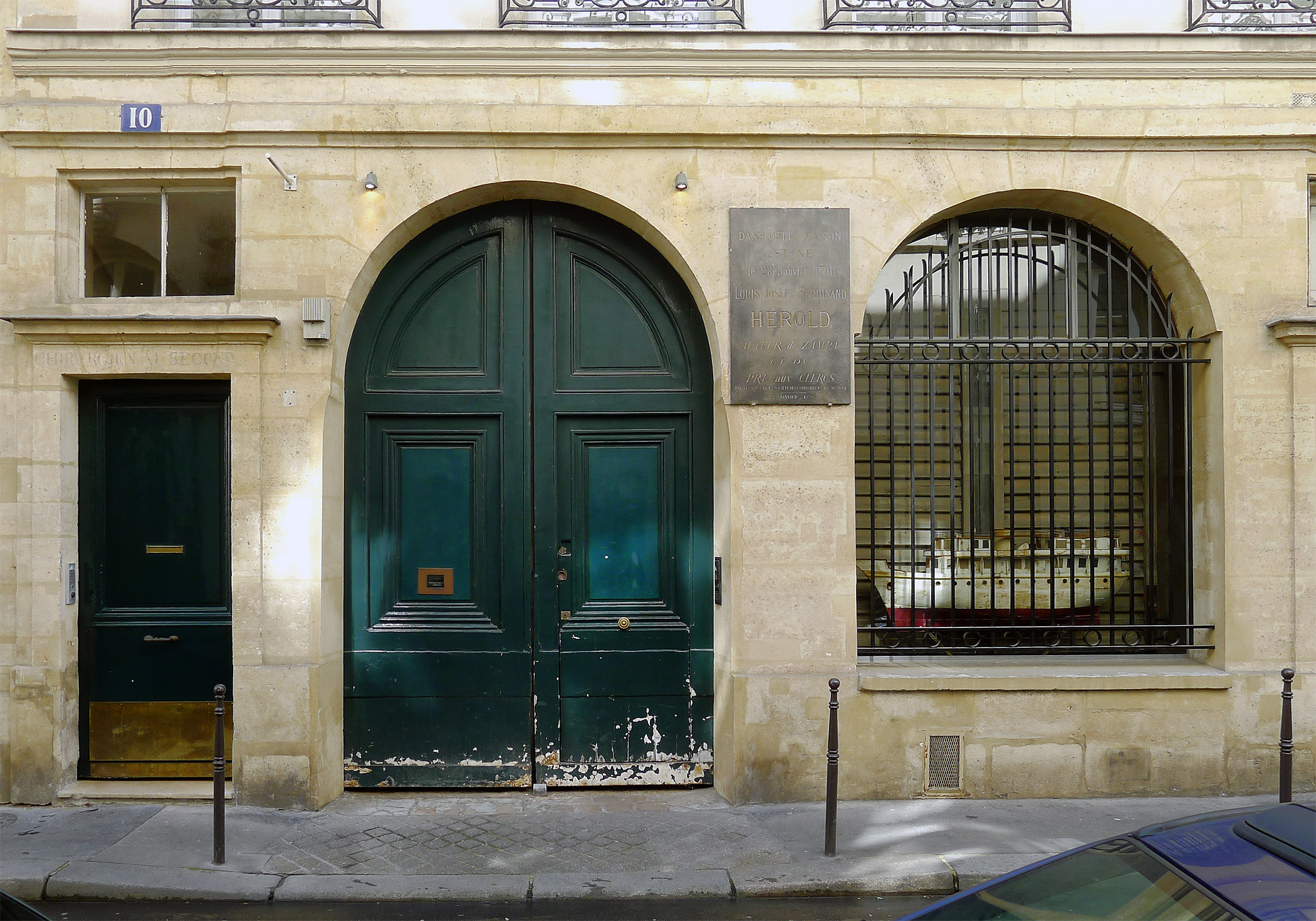
The composer's birthplace, in the Paris street now named after him

The Herold family was of Alsatian origin (the surname was written without an acute accent). The composer's father, François-Joseph Herold (1755–1802) was the son of an organist in Seltz. François-Joseph studied music with C. P. E. Bach in Hamburg and moved to Paris in about 1780, where he worked as a composer, pianist and teacher. In 1790 he married Jeanne-Gabrielle Pascal. Their only child, Louis Joseph Ferdinand Herold, later widely known as Ferdinand Hérold, was born in what is now the rue Herold in the 1st arrondissement on 28 January 1791. Wanting the boy to have an all-round education, François-Joseph sent him, aged eleven, to one of the best boarding schools in Paris, the Hix institute in the Champs-Élysées. The school included music in the curriculum, and Hérold studied solfège with François-Joseph Fétis. At the same time he continued his piano studies with his godfather, Louis Adam.

François-Joseph did not intend his son to follow him into the musical profession, but his death, from tuberculosis, in 1802 left Hérold free to do so. In 1806, when he was nearly 16, he entered the Paris Conservatoire, where he studied piano with Adam, harmony with Charles-Simon Catel and violin with Rodolphe Kreutzer. In 1810 he won the conservatoire's first prize for piano, playing one of his own compositions. In 1811 he was admitted to the composition class of Étienne Méhul, who esteemed his talents greatly, saw him as his successor, and became a much-loved father-figure to him. During 1812 works by Hérold were performed publicly for the first time. They included a piano concerto given on 6 April at the Théâtre Italien with the composer as soloist.

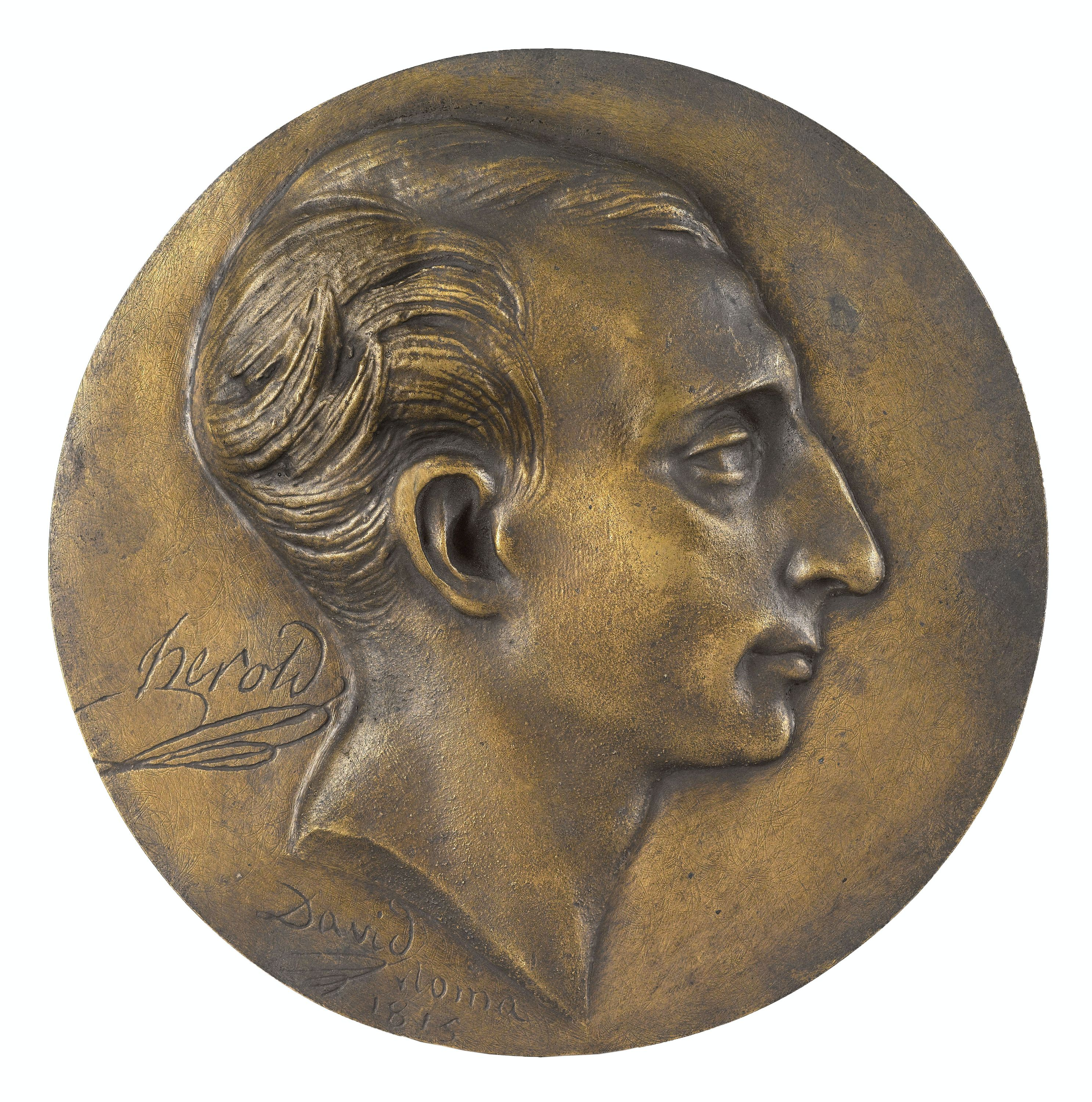
Hérold in 1813: medallion by his fellow student David d'Angers

In October 1812 Hérold was awarded France's premier musical prize, the Prix de Rome, which he won with a cantata, La Duchesse de la Vallière. The prize carried with it liberally subsidised residence and tuition at the Villa Medici, the French Academy in Rome, where Hérold went in 1813. There, he composed his first symphony and an anthem. Like his father, Hérold suffered from tuberculosis, and the climate of Rome did not suit him; he moved south to Naples in 1815.

In Naples, Hérold won the approval of Joachim Murat, whom Napoleon had installed as King of Naples. Hérold was engaged as court pianist to Murat's wife, Queen Caroline, and music teacher to their daughters. While in Naples, Hérold was commissioned in 1814 to write his first opera, La gioventù di Enrico quinto (The Boyhood of Henry V), to a libretto from Alexandre Pineux-Duval's play La jeunesse de Henry V about Prince Hal of England. It was premiered in January 1815 at the Teatro del Fondo before Murat's court, with Manuel García in the title role. Shortly after this, the Napoleonic empire began to disintegrate, and Hérold left Naples, making a circuitous journey back to Paris. He went via Rome and Venice to Vienna, where he met Antonio Salieri, whom he admired, and heard operas by Mozart.

=== Return to Paris ===
La Clochette, an early operatic success for Hérold, 1817

Hérold arrived back in Paris in August 1815, where he took the post of maestro al cembalo (deputy conductor and répétiteur) at the Théâtre Italien. In 1816 the composer François-Adrien Boieldieu invited him to collaborate on a new opera Charles de France, to which Hérold contributed the second act. In the same year he composed the opera Les Rosières, dedicated to Méhul, produced successfully at the Opéra-Comique. He had another success with La Clochette (The Bell, 1817), based on the story of Aladdin and his lamp; it ran well in Paris and was seen in Vienna (with additional numbers by Franz Schubert) (Note: In 1821 Schubert contributed two extra numbers for a production of La Clochette ("Das Zauberglöckchen") at the Theater am Kärntnertor in Vienna.) After these, he had difficulty finding adequate librettos, and suffered four failures in a row between 1818 and 1821, following which he gave up composing operas for more than two years.

In 1821 the director of the Théâtre Italien asked Hérold to go to Italy to find new works and recruit new singers. Across a four-month trip he visited seven major Italian cities and attended performances of Rossini operas including La donna del lago, which made a strong impression on him, La gazza ladra and Ricciardo e Zoraide. He recruited singers including Giuditta Pasta, Filippo Galli for his Parisian employer.

During 1823 Hérold had another opera produced, Le Muletier; despite an unimpressive libretto the music was well received. The biographer Thomas Betzwieser writes that in Le Muletier Hérold "found his own language for the first time" so that this work marks the emergence of his personal style. A one-act piece for the Paris Opéra, L'Asthénie, had a moderate run but was not well reviewed, and it was not until 1826 that he had another success, with Marie at the Opéra-Comique.

In November 1826 Hérold gave up his post at the Théâtre Italien and became premier chef de chant (senior voice coach) at the Opéra, working on major works in the grand opéra genre such as Le Siège de Corinthe, Guillaume Tell, and Robert le diable. His position as chef de chant meant that he was barred from having his own operas performed at the Opéra, and his principal commissions there over the next three years were for ballet music: Astolphe et Jaconde (1827), La Somnambule (The Sleepwalker) (1827), La Fille mal gardée (1828) Lydie (1828), La Belle au bois dormant (The Sleeping Beauty) (1829) and La Noce de village (Village Wedding) (1830).

Hérold married Adèle Elise Rollet in 1827. They had three children: Ferdinand, who became a lawyer and subsequently a senator; Adèle, who married a member of the Paris Conseil municipal; and Eugénie, a gifted musician, who, like her father and grandfather was consumptive, and died aged 20.

=== Final years ===
Zampa, 1831

Betzwieser writes that the composer's last three years were dominated by the writing of "his two masterpieces": Zampa (1831) and Le Pré aux clercs (1832). The first had a romantic libretto by Mélesville that appealed to the public and brought out the best in Hérold. The work had a tentative start because of a financial crisis at Opéra-Comique and the defection of the company's leading tenor, but it quickly became one of the most popular opéras comiques of the 19th century, in France and elsewhere, being staged in the US and Britain in 1833. (Note: The English premiere was conducted by Hummel, who provided a new finale for the third act, "with a Double Chorus".)

In mid-1832 the Opéra-Comique had to close because of a cholera outbreak and civil disorder. During this period Hérold finished Le Pré aux clercs, to a libretto by Eugène de Planard based on Prosper Mérimée's historical novel Les Chroniques du temps de Charles IX (1829). Betzwieser writes that it aroused wild enthusiasm at its premiere on 15 December 1832.

By the time of the first performance of Le Pré aux clercs in December 1832 the composer's tubercular condition had grown worse. His strength was taxed by the need to rehearse a new leading lady at short notice when the soprano cast for the role withdrew after her demand for higher fees was refused. Five weeks after the premiere he died, nine days short of 42, at his house in Paris, and was buried at Père Lachaise Cemetery.

Hérold left an unfinished opera, Ludovic. His friend Fromental Halévy completed the score, and it was performed three months after Hérold's death. By the end of the 19th century Le Pré aux clercs had been performed more than 1,500 times in Paris.

== Music ==
The musicologist Gustav Choquet wrote in 1904 that Hérold's early symphonic, choral and chamber works show that the composer could have excelled in concert works had he continued in that type of composition, but the stage "possesses an irresistible attraction for a man gifted with ardent imagination and capacity for expressing emotion", leading Hérold to opera and the ballet.

=== Ballets ===
Costume design for Marie Taglioni in La Belle au bois dormant, 1829

Until Hérold's day the role of the composer was not a prestigious one in the world of ballet. In The International Encyclopedia of Dance, Ole Nørlyng observes that ballet scores before then "seldom rose above light arrangements of well-known melodies and dance tunes". Hérold, and his friend Adolphe Adam (son of his godfather and piano teacher), made the first steps to elevating ballet scores to a higher musical level. Hérold continued the practice of using familiar operatic tunes (partly to aid audiences' comprehension of mime scenes), but he borrowed carefully and with discrimination. La Belle au bois dormant is an early example, using music from, inter alia, Weber's Der Freischütz and showing, ("if in a crude form", in Nørlyng's phrase) the first steps towards more dramatically penetrating ballet music.

Nørlyng adds that in addition, Hérold "had a never-failing elegance of orchestration, a melodic richness, and the ability to create dramatic effects". Nonetheless, Hérold did not treat the role of ballet composer with the attention he gave to his operas: he was known to compose his ballets at the dinner table while talking to friends. When they objected to his spending his talents on such trivial work he replied, "Plus j'écris, plus les idées me viennent" ("The more I write, the more ideas come to me").

Although Hérold's name is associated in the public mind with the music for La Fille mal gardée, the score he wrote for the Opéra in 1828 differs substantially from that played in modern productions of the ballet. His score is known to have incorporated some music from an earlier production of the ballet, as well as other contemporary sources, notably Rossini. Later productions have added music by Peter Ludwig Hertel, and the most famous number in the piece, the clog dance, is a modern invention, based on one of Hertel's tunes, by John Lanchbery, who revised the whole score in 1959 for Frederick Ashton's production. Lanchbery maintained that the orchestration of Hérold's score is inferior to that of his operas, probably because it was hurriedly composed.

Eugène Scribe's libretto for La Somnambule (which inspired Bellini's opera La sonnambula) led Hérold to produce what Nørlyng describes as a graceful, pastoral score, in which, innovatively, Hérold sought to connect the music to the drama through the use of melodic motifs.

=== Operas ===
Betzwieser comments that despite many deficiencies in the librettos of his early operas, Herold's talent for music drama was clear from the outset, and that he advanced the genre of opéra comique with his colourful and varied orchestration, and his gift for smooth transition between the spoken and sung sections of his works. In a 1904 survey of Hérold's work, Choquet praised La Clochette for its abundance of new and fresh ideas, its stagecraft and original instrumentation. He added that although its immediate successors showed the composer's industry and fertility, operas like Le premier venu (1818), Les Troqueurs (1819), L' Amour platonique (1819), and L'Auteur mort et vivant (1820) had "librettos that were neither interesting nor adapted for music" . Le Muletier (1823), however, is "full of life and colour, and assured his reputation". Choquet adds that after the success of the lively Le Muletier it is puzzling that a man of Hérold's literary tastes and culture should have chosen to set dramas "so tame and uninteresting as L'asthenie (1823), and Le Lapin blanc (1825)": he concludes that Hérold's urge to compose led him to accept any libretto offered to him.

By the time of the comedy Marie (1826) Hérold was incorporating elements of both Rossini's and Beethoven's musical language. In Betzwieser's view Marie represents "a crucial turning point in Herold's writing", and the poet Gérard de Nerval described the work as the "golden link" between Hérold's early operas and the later masterpieces Zampa and Le Pré aux clercs.

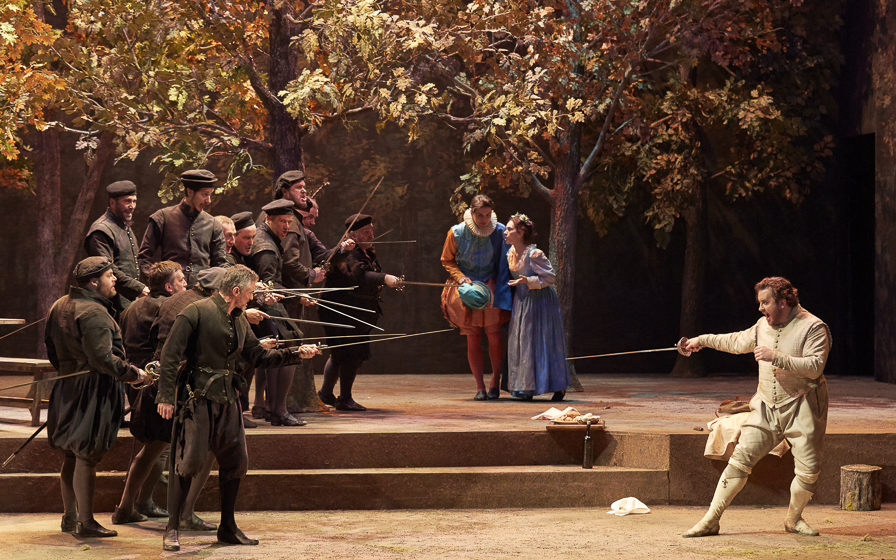
Le Pré aux clercs: 2015 production, Opéra-Comique, Paris

For Zampa, a variant of the Don Juan story – with a female statue rather than a male one bringing nemesis to the antihero – Hérold wrote an overture that contains five different themes related to the action and score of the opera. In the three acts of Zampa Hérold, in Betzwieser's view, shows particular skill in differentiating between the traditional numbers of opéra comique, "from the solo numbers (ballade, barcarole, chanson etc.), used to illustrate the various characters, to the large-scale finales, notable for their skilful variation and the building of a dramatic climax". Berlioz found things to praise in Zampa but thought Hérold lacked a style of his own, yet was neither Italian, nor French, nor German: "His music strongly resembles those industrial products made in Paris according to processes invented elsewhere and slightly modified; it is Parisian music", which, Berlioz thought, was why the Parisian middle classes loved it. But Betzwieser observes that Zampa's Romantic features made it highly successful outside France, and writing in Grove's Dictionary of Music and Musicians the British critic Elizabeth Forbes commented in 1992, "All the music is perfectly suited to its subject, while the portions devoted to Zampa and the statue are highly dramatic as well as melodious".

Forbes writes that Le Pré aux clercs is acknowledged by composers and musicians as one of the finest of its period. The story covers similar ground to Meyerbeer's Les Huguenots, but in an intimate, more personal way. Forbes finds the score "a chain of fine numbers, extremely melodious and pretty, but also dramatically well suited to the various characters", with a balance between comedy and romance. In a 2016 analysis of the score, Gérard Condé writes, "Though doubtless derivative in certain respects, the score of Le Pré aux clercs went on to serve as a recipe book for the next half-century: Lecocq, Offenbach, Varney, Audran and even Bizet consulted it with profit, each to his own ends". In the overture Hérold does not use themes from the opera, but ranges from an opening fugue to a quick march. Wagner and Smetana both knew the opera well, and in another 2016 analysis, Damien Colas writes that echoes of Le Pré aux clercs may be found in the former's Das Liebesverbot (1836) and the latter's The Bartered Bride (1866). In The Oxford Companion to Music (2011) Sarah Hibberd writes, "the power of Le Pré aux clercs in particular suggests that [Hérold] might have fulfilled his ambition to compose a grand opéra had he lived".

=== List of works ===
==== Operas ====
Source: Arthur Pougin Herold.

- 1815 La gioventù di Enrico quinto
- 1816 Charles de France ou Amour et gloire (Note: with François-Adrien Boieldieu)
- 1816–1817 Corinne au capitole
- 1817 Les Rosières
- 1817 La Clochette ou Le diable page
- 1818 Le Premier venu ou Six lieues de chemin
- 1819 Les Troqueurs
- 1819 L'Amour platonique
- 1820 L'Auteur mort et vivant
- 1823 Le Muletier
- 1823 L'Asthenie
- 1823 Vendôme en Espagne (Note: with Daniel Auber)
- 1824 Le Roi René ou La Provence au XVe siècle
- 1825 Le Lapin blanc
- 1826 Marie (also called Almédon ou le monde renversé)
- 1828 Le Dernier jour de Missolonghi
- 1829 L'Illusion
- 1829 Emmeline
- 1830 L'Auberge d'Auray
- 1831 Zampa ou La Fiancée de marbre
- 1831 La Marquise de Brinvilliers (Note: with Auber, Batton, Berton, Blangini, Boïeldieu, Carafa, Cherubini and Paer)
- 1832 La Médecine sans médecin
- 1832 Le Pré aux clercs
- 1833 Ludovic (completed by Halévy)

==== Ballets ====
Source: Pougin.

- 1827 Astolphe et Joconde ou Les coureurs d'aventures
- 1827 La Somnambule ou L'arrivée d'un nouveau seigneur
- 1828 La Fille mal gardée
- 1828 Lydie
- 1829 La Belle au bois dormant
- 1830 La Noce de village

==== Choral ====
Source: Pougin.

- La Duchesse de la Vallièr, cantata
- Regrets des Braves, stances sur la mort de le duc de Berry
- Les Grandes Journées, chant national
- Hymne aux Morts de Juillet
- Le Chasseur des montagnes, romance

==== Piano music ====
Source: Pougin.

- Four concertos for piano and orchestra
- 7 Sonatas, opp. 1, 3 ,5 and 9
- 9 Caprices, in three suites, opp. 4, 6 and 7:
- Caprice with string quartet accompaniment, op. 8
- Caprice on la Clochette, op. 12
- Caprice on la Médecine sans médecin, op. 58
- 11 Fantaisies brillantes on themes from operas, op. 21, 23, 24, 28, 32, 33, 38, 39, 43, 45 and 49
- 23 Rondos, op. 14, 16, 17, 18, 22, 27, 29, 31, 34, 36, 37 40 41, 42, 44, 46, 47, 53, 54, 55, 57 and 59
- Variations (on diverse themes), op. 2, 11, 19, 30, 35, 48, 56
- La Promenade sur mer, fantasie on a Neapolitan barcarolle, op. 15
- Polonaise on les Voitures versées, op. 20
- Air de ballet, op. 50
- Allegro-bacchanale, op. 51
- Scène du ballet de la Belle au bois dormant, op. 52
- Divertissement on les Rosières, op. 10
- Grande Bacchanale de Spontini, for piano with accompaniment of violin, double bass and tambour de basque (ad libitum), op. 13

==== Instrumental music ====
Source: Pougin.

- 2 symphonies: No.1 in C Major & No.2 in D Major
- Air varié for bassoon, with two violons, viola, double bass, two clarinets and two horns
- Trio concertant for two bassoons and horn
- 3 String Quartets: No.1 in D Major, No.2 in C Major & No.3 in G minor

== Notes, references and sources ==
=== Sources ===
- Choquet, Gustave (1904). "Hérold, Louis Joseph Ferdinand". Grove's Dictionary of Music and Musicians. Vol. II (second ed.). London: Macmillan. OCLC 872326042.
- Clive, H. P. (1997). Schubert and his World: A Biographical Dictionary. Oxford and New York: Oxford University Press. ISBN 978-0-19-816582-8.
- Colas, Damien (2016). "A popular and sophisticated comedy". Louis-Ferdinand Hérold: 'Le Pré aux clercs'. Venice: Centre de musique romantique française. ISBN 978-84-608-9224-3.
- Condé, Gérard (2016). "The Music of 'Le Pre aux clercs'". Louis-Ferdinand Hérold: 'Le Pré aux clercs'. Venice: Centre de musique romantique française. ISBN 978-84-608-9224-3.
- Kuhn, Laura; Nicolas Slonimsky (2001). Baker's Biographical Dictionary of Musicians. Vol. 3 (Centennial ed.). New York: Schirmer Books. ISBN 978-0-02-865527-7.
- Pougin, Arthur (1906). Herold. Les musiciens célèbres. Paris: H. Laurens. OCLC 1994688.
