= Salle de la Bourse =

Former theatre building in Paris, France

- Théâtre des Nouveautés
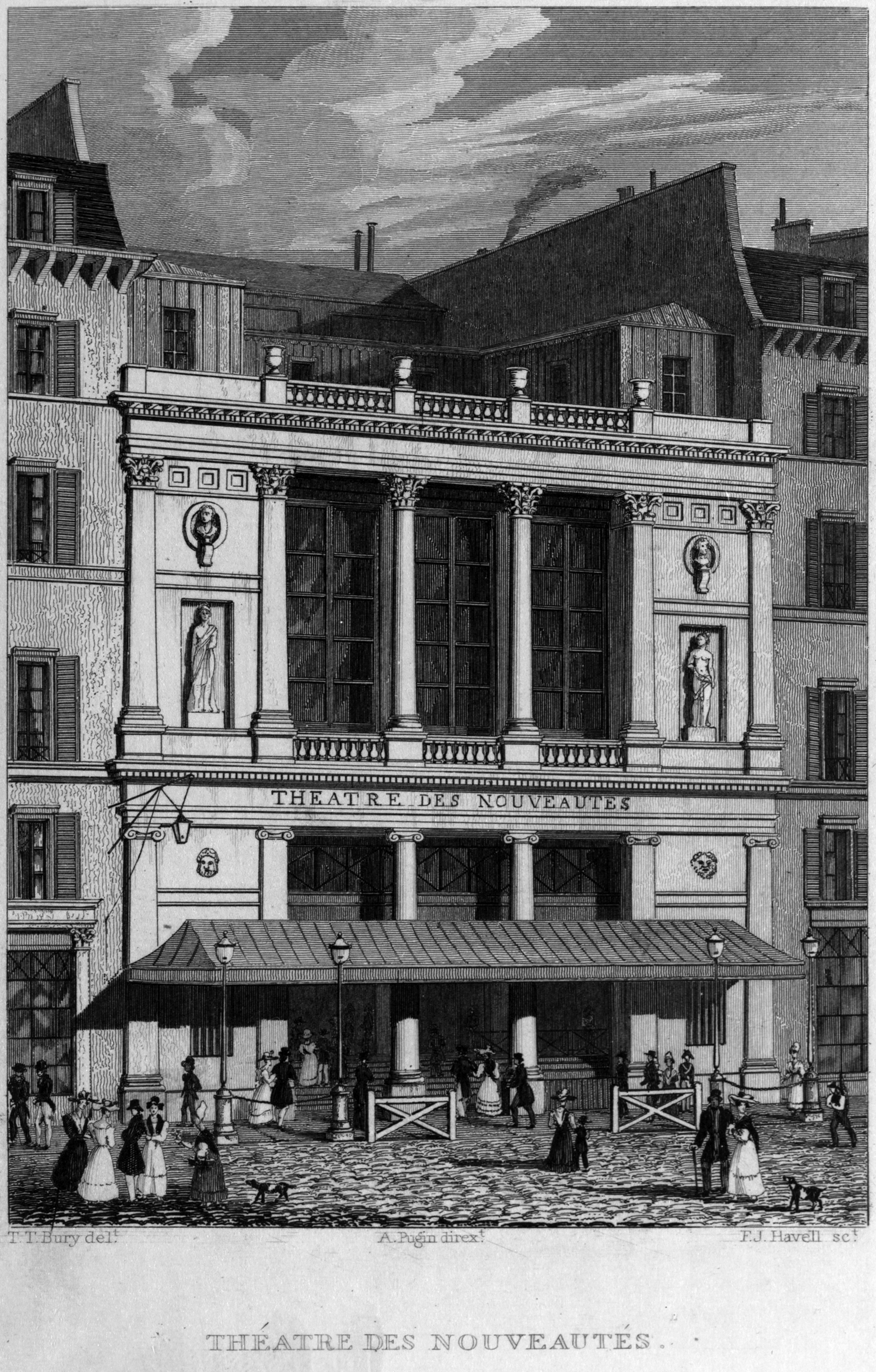
- Principal facade of the Salle de la Bourse
- Interactive map of Salle de la Bourse
- Address: Rue Vivienne at its intersection with the Rue des Filles-St. Thomas, 2nd arrondissement, Paris
- Coordinates: 48.869147°N 2.340072°E
- Capacity: 1200 seats
- Type: Opera house; Theatre

Construction
- Opened: 1 March 1827
- Closed: 1 April 1869
- Demolished: 1869
- Architects: François Debret (1827), Lambert (1851 restoration)

Tenants
- Théâtre des Nouveautés (1827–1832); Opéra-Comique (1832–1840); Théâtre du Vaudeville (1840–1869)

The Salle de la Bourse (French pronunciation: [sal də la buʁs]) was a Parisian theatre located on the rue Vivienne in the 2nd arrondissement, across from the Paris Bourse, hence the name. It was successively the home of the Théâtre des Nouveautés (1827–1832), the Opéra-Comique (1832–1840), and the Théâtre du Vaudeville (1840–1869). The theatre was demolished in 1869.

== Théâtre des Nouveautés (1827–1832) ==
The Salle de la Bourse was built to the designs of the French architect François Debret for the first Théâtre des Nouveautés, which opened there on 1 March 1827. The founder was Cyprien Bérard, a former director of the Théâtre du Vaudeville. The programs consisted of ballads, opéras comiques (Hector Berlioz was a chorister there for a few months), satires and political plays. The theatre suffered the prohibitions of censorship and had recurrent difficulties with the Opéra-Comique, which refused to share its privileges. However, for other reasons Bérard was forced to close his theatre on 15 February 1832.

== Opéra-Comique (1832–1840) ==
By chance the Opéra-Comique, which had been bankrupted by the exorbitant rents at the Salle Ventadour, left that theatre and on 24 September 1832 opened at the Salle de la Bourse, which was often still referred to as the Théâtre des Nouveautés. The Opéra-Comique remained at the theatre for almost eight years, and the premieres of Hérold's Ludovic and Le pré aux clercs, Adam's Le chalet and Le postillon de Lonjumeau, Halévy's L'éclair, Auber's L'ambassadrice and Le domino noir, and Donizetti's La fille du régiment were all given there. The company's last performance in the theatre was on 30 April 1840, after which it moved to the new (second) Salle Favart.

== Théâtre du Vaudeville (1840–1869) ==
The Théâtre du Vaudeville then moved into the Salle de la Bourse, opening on 16 May 1840 and remaining there until 11 April 1869, when it moved into a new theatre on the Boulevard des Capucines. The Salle de la Bourse was closed and immediately demolished. In its place there is now a pub named The Vaudeville in memory of that theatre.

== Bibliography ==
- Bara, Olivier (2009). "The Company at the Heart of the Operatic Institution: Chollet and the Changing Nature of Comic-Opera Role Types during the July Monarchy" in Fauser and Everist 2009, pp. 11–28.
- Fauser, Annegret; Everist, Mark, editors (2009). Music, theater, and cultural transfer. Paris, 1830–1914. Chicago: The University of Chicago Press. ISBN 978-0-226-23926-2.
- Hemmings, F. W. J. (1994). Theatre and State in France, 1760–1905. New York: Cambridge University Press. ISBN 978-0-521-03472-2 (2006 reprint).
- Sadie, Stanley, ed. (1992). The New Grove Dictionary of Opera (4 volumes). London: Macmillan. ISBN 978-1-56159-228-9.
- Wild, Nicole; Charlton, David (2005). Théâtre de l'Opéra-Comique Paris: répertoire 1762-1972. Sprimont, Belgium: Editions Mardaga. ISBN 978-2-87009-898-1.
- Wild, Nicole ([1989]). Dictionnaire des théâtres parisiens au XIXe siècle: les théâtres et la musique. Paris: Aux Amateurs de livres. ISBN 9780828825863. ISBN 9782905053800 (paperback). View formats and editions at WorldCat.
