= Olivier Mantei =

French opera and theater director (born 1965)

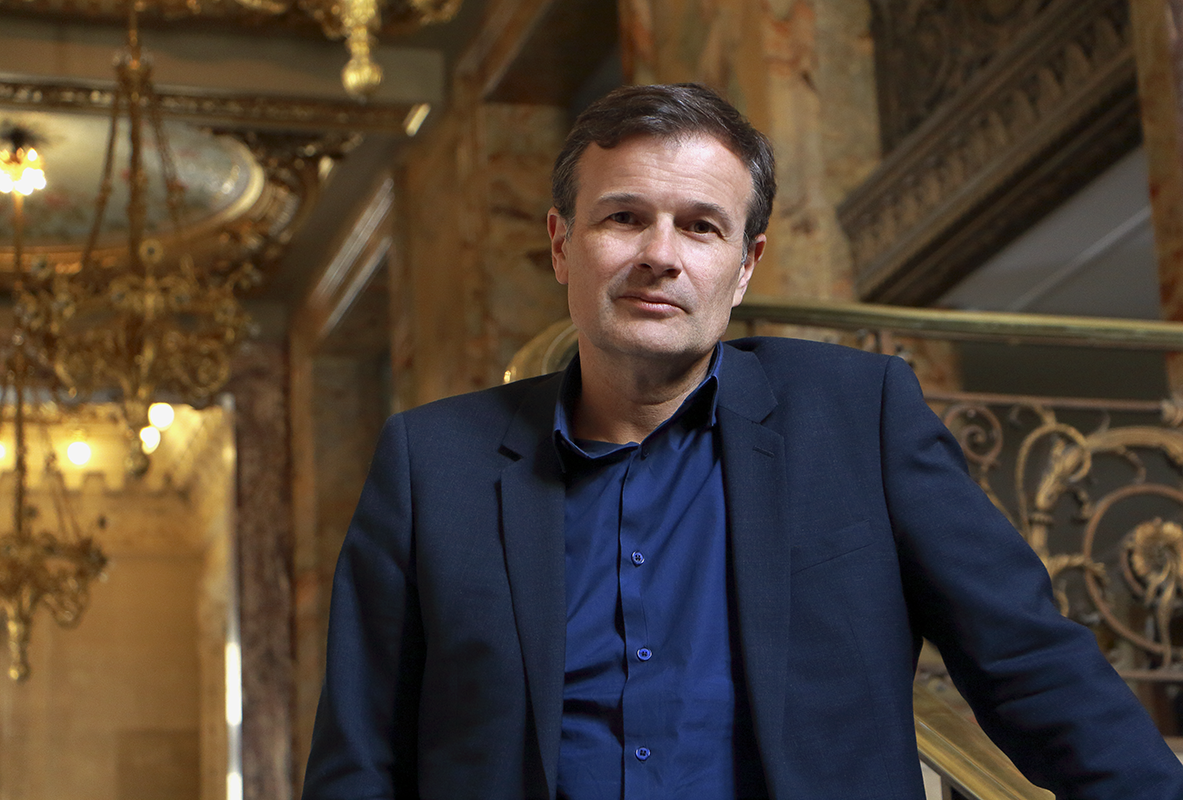
Olivier Mantei in April 2017 at the Opéra Comique

Olivier Mantei (born 24 February 1965, in Nantes) is a contemporary French director of theatre and opera stages. Since 2015, he has been director of the Opéra-Comique in Paris.

== Honours ==
Mantei was made an officier of the National Order of Merit in November 2013 and Officier of the Ordre des Arts et des Lettres in July 2016.

== Publications ==
- Public / Privé: Nouvelles acceptions culturelles, Riveneuve, Paris 2014 ISBN 2360132180.
