= Le domino noir =

Opera by Daniel Auber

- Opéra comique by Daniel Auber
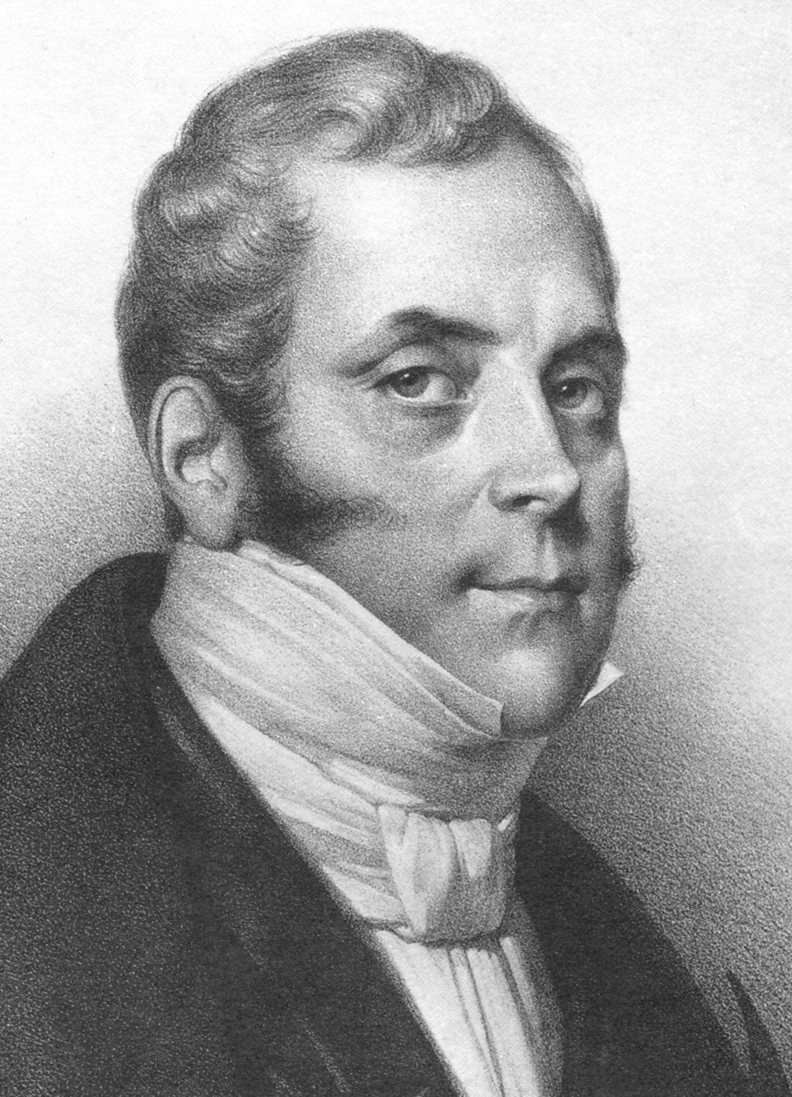
- The composer c. 1825
- Librettist: Eugène Scribe
- Language: French
- Premiere: 2 December 1837; Salle de la Bourse, Paris

Le domino noir (The Black Domino) is an opéra comique by the French composer Daniel Auber, first performed on 2 December 1837 by the Opéra-Comique at the Salle de la Bourse in Paris. The libretto to the three-act piece is by Auber's usual collaborator, Eugène Scribe. It was one of Auber's most successful works, clocking up 1,207 performances by 1909. It received its UK premiere in 1838 and appeared in the USA the following year. Some of Auber's music has a Spanish flavour to reflect its setting.

In 1869, Pyotr Ilyich Tchaikovsky provided recitatives to replace the spoken dialogue for a proposed production of Le domino noir by an Italian opera company visiting Russia. No performances are believed to have taken place, but four of Tchaikovsky's recitatives were included in Richard Bonynge's recording of the opera.

== Performance history ==
There was a production of the opera by Pierre Jourdan at the Théâtre Imperial at Compiègne in 1995 and an other at the Opéra Comique at Paris in 2018, with Anne-Catherine Gillet and Cyrille Dubois.

In 2007, the St. Petersburg Conservatory Theatre in Russia included Tchaikovsky's recitatives in its production.

== Roles ==
Role	Voice type	Premiere Cast, 2 December 1837 (Conductor: - )
Angèle de Olivarès, a novice nun	soprano	Laure Cinti-Damoreau
Brigitte de San Lucar, her fellow nun and confidante	soprano	Julie Berthault
Horace de Massarena, a young Spanish nobleman	tenor	Joseph-Antoine-Charles Couderc
Count Juliano, his friend	tenor	Théodore-Étienne Moreau-Sainti
Jacinthe, Juliano's housekeeper	alto	Mme Boulanger
Gil Perez, Jacinthe's lover	bass	Roy
Ursule, another nun, later abbess of the convent	soprano	Thérèse Olivier
Lord Elfort, a British diplomat	baritone	Honoré Grignon
Gertrude, convent portress	alto	Mme Roy

== Synopsis ==
Time: c. 1780
Place: Madrid

The action concerns a young novice nun, Angèle de Olivarès. Enjoying her last freedom before taking final vows, Angèle slips out of the Ursuline convent along with her companion Brigitte to attend a ball in honour of the Queen of Spain's birthday. To conceal her identity, she wears a black half-mask (the "domino" of the title). A year previously, at the same ball, Angèle had met a young man, Horace de Masserena. Horace has fallen in love with her and returns to the ball in the hope of seeing her again. Instead he meets the unknown woman in the black mask and dances with her. Thinking to help Horace, his friend Count Juliano sets the clock back an hour causing Angèle to miss leaving at midnight, which would have allowed her to get back to the convent in time before the gates close. Angèle runs off and tries to take shelter for the night in a house she finds on the way. Unfortunately, it turns out to belong to Count Juliano who is holding a late-night party for his friends. Angèle persuades the housekeeper to disguise her as her niece from the country. She manages to fool everyone except, of course, Horace who recognises her from the ball a year ago. He does not tell anyone else but locks Angèle in a room where he hopes to keep her until she gives him an explanation. But Angèle is inadvertently freed by the housekeeper's lover, the drunken Gil Perez, who opens the door and runs off, having mistaken her for a demon in her mask and cloak. Angèle manages to slip undiscovered into the convent, where on the very same day she is to be installed as abbess. Shortly before the ceremony, a letter from the queen frees her from her vows, which allows her to marry Horace, and Ursule, her jealous rival for the office, to the chagrin of other nuns, is named the new abbess instead.

== Scores and libretto ==
Piano-vocal scores

- Le domino noir (piano-vocal score, in French). Paris: Benoit. View at Internet Archive. (This copy has handwritten casts for numerous productions as well as illustrations.)
- Le domino noir (piano-vocal score, in French). Paris: Brandus. View at Internet Archive. View at Google Books.
- Le domino noir (piano-vocal score, edited by Arthur Sullivan and J. Pittman, in Italian and English, the latter by Charles L. Kenny). London: Boosey. View at Internet Archive.
- Der schwarze Domino (piano-vocal score, in a German translation by Freiherr von Lichtenstein, as well as French). London and Mainz: Schott. View at Internet Archive.

Libretto

- Le domino noir (libretto in French, including spoken dialogue). Le magasin théatral. Copies 1 and 2 at Internet Archive.

== Recordings ==
- Le domino noir Sumi Jo, Bruce Ford, Isabelle Vernet, Jules Bastin, London Voices, English Chamber Orchestra, conducted by Richard Bonynge (Decca, recorded Walthamstow Assembly Hall, February 1993)
