= Arthur Pougin =

French musician and writer (1834–1921)

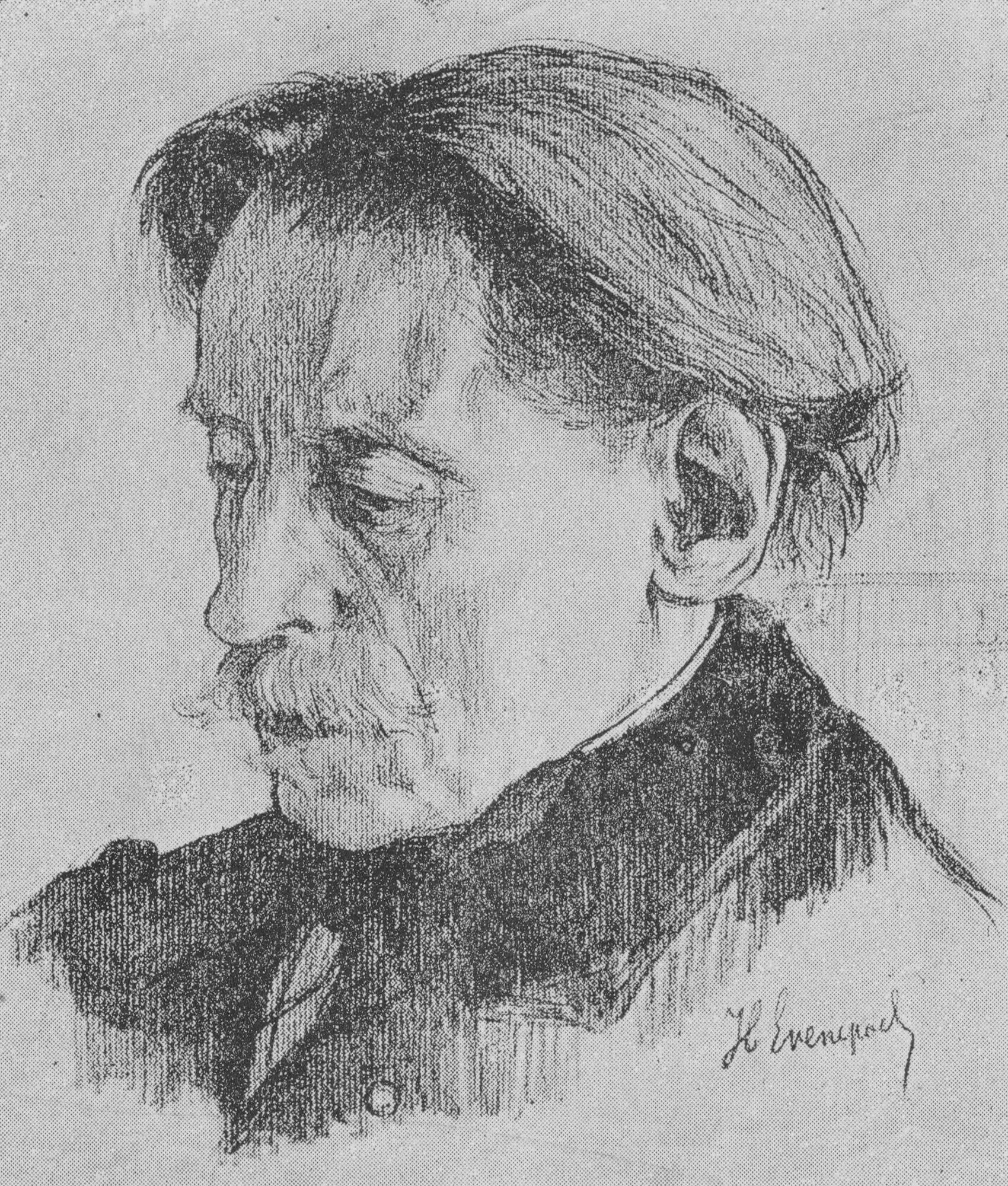
Arthur Pougin

Arthur Pougin (French: [puʒɛ̃] 6 August 1834 – 8 August 1921) was a French musical and dramatic critic and writer. He was born at Châteauroux (Indre) and studied music at the Conservatoire de Paris under Jean-Delphin Alard (violin) and Napoléon Henri Reber (harmony). In 1855 he became conductor at the Théâtre Beaumarchais, and afterward leader at Philippe Musard's concerts, subconductor at the Folies-Nouvelles, and from 1860 to 1863 he was first violin at the Opéra-Comique. He began publishing articles in the Revue et Gazette musicale in 1859.

He was in turn feuilleton writer to Le Soir, La Tribune, L'Événement and Le Journal Officiel, besides being a frequent contributor to all the important French musical periodicals. He was editor in chief of the music journal Le Ménestrel from 1885 to 1914. His work in connection with François-Joseph Fétis's Biographie universelle, for which he prepared a supplement (two volumes, 1878–80), has, however, been found to be lacking in thoroughness. He edited the new edition of Clément and Larousse's Dictionnaire lyrique.

Pougin died in Paris at age 87.
