= Opéra-Comique =

Opera company in Paris, France

- Théâtre national de l'Opéra-Comique
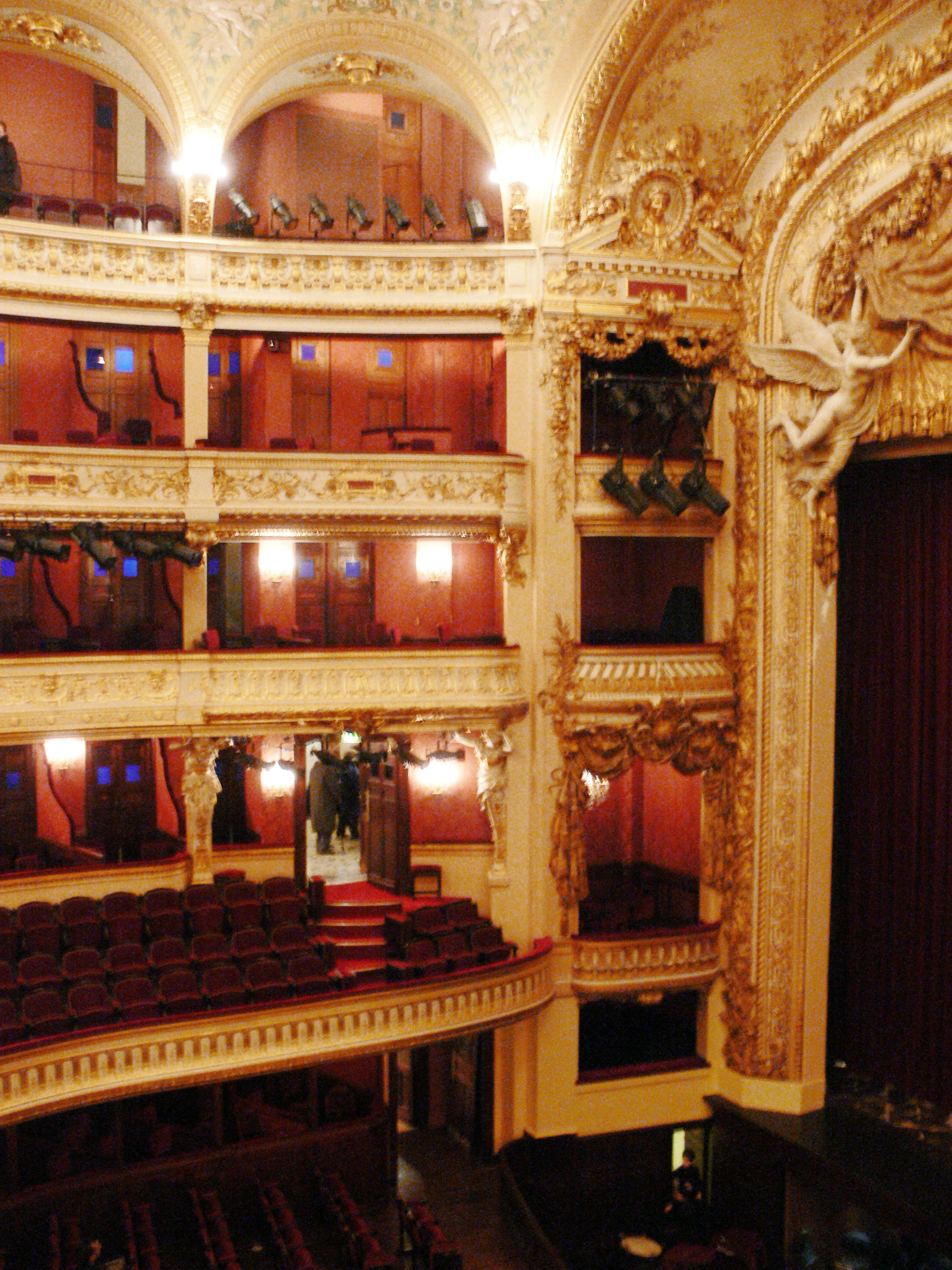
- Interior of the Salle Favart, 2008
- Merged into: Comedie-Italienne (1762); Théâtre Feydeau (1801)
- Formation: 1714
- Founder: Catherine Baron, Louis Gaultier de St. Edme
- Founded at: Foire Saint-Germain
- Type: Opera company
- Location: Place Boïeldieu, Paris
- Leader: Olivier Mantei
- Website: www.opera-comique.com
- Formerly called: Nouvel Opéra-Comique de Dominique; Nouvel Opéra-Comique de Baxter et Sorin; Théâtre de la Foire Saint-Germain; Théâtre de la Foire Saint-Laurent; Théâtre de l'Opéra-Comique de la Foire Saint-Germain; Comédie-Italienne; Théâtre-Italien

The Opéra-Comique (French pronunciation: [ɔpeʁa kɔmik]) is a Paris opera company which was founded around 1714 by some of the popular theatres of the Parisian fairs. In 1762 the company was merged with – and for a time took the name of – its chief rival, the Comédie-Italienne at the Hôtel de Bourgogne. It was also called the Théâtre-Italien up to about 1793, when it again became most commonly known as the Opéra-Comique. The company's official name is Théâtre national de l'Opéra-Comique, and its theatre, with a capacity of around 1,248 seats, sometimes referred to as the Salle Favart (the third on this site), is located at Place Boïeldieu in the 2nd arrondissement of Paris, not far from the Palais Garnier, one of the theatres of the Paris Opéra. The musicians and others associated with the Opéra-Comique have made important contributions to operatic history and tradition in France and to French opera. Its mission is to reconnect with its history and discover its unique repertoire to ensure production and dissemination of operas for the wider public. Mainstays of the repertory at the Opéra-Comique during its history have included works which have each been performed more than 1,000 times by the company: Cavalleria Rusticana, Le chalet, La dame blanche, Le domino noir, La fille du régiment, Lakmé, Manon, Mignon, Les noces de Jeannette, Le pré aux clercs, Tosca, La bohème, Werther and Carmen, the last having been performed more than 2,500 times.

== Origins ==
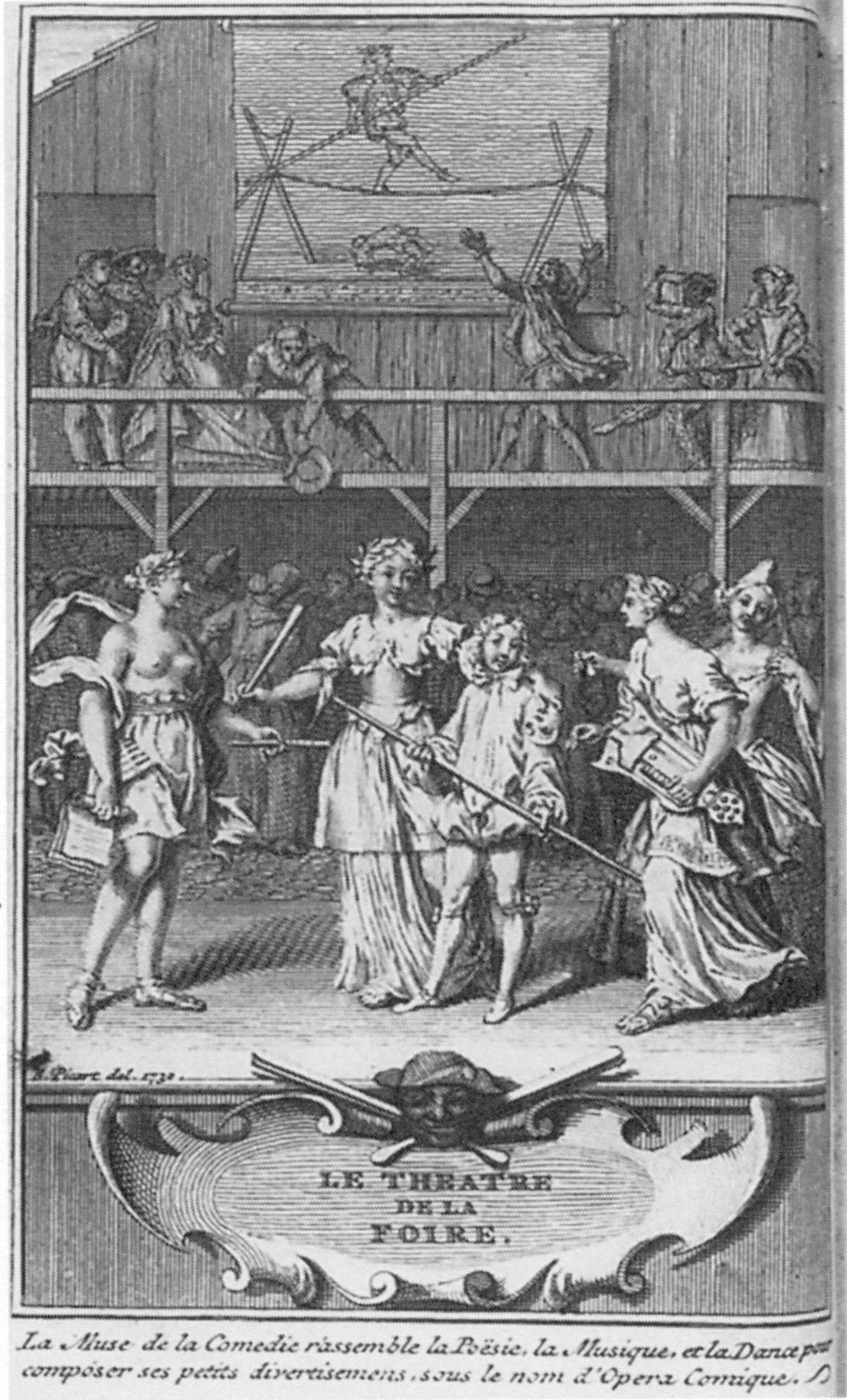
The Muse of Comedy assembles Poetry, Music, and Dance to form Opéra Comique (1722)

Since the Middle Ages popular light theatrical entertainments had been a part of the seasonal Parisian fairs, especially the Foire Saint-Germain and the Foire Saint-Laurent. They included farces, tightrope acts, acrobatics, and marionettes, and also included music, such as vaudevilles and popular songs. The audiences were diverse, from all levels of society, and the presentations were given on makeshift stages. However, with the establishment in 1672 of King Louis XIV's Académie royale de Musique (popularly known as the Opéra) under Jean-Baptiste Lully, the use of music by fair troupes was significantly curtailed.

When the Italian players at the Hôtel de Bourgogne were banished from Paris in 1697 for performing their comedy La fausse prude ("The False Prude"), which satirized the King's wife, Madame de Maintenon, the fair theatres were quick to adopt much of the Italians' repertory, which included parodies of operas and tragedies. The fair theatres were soon viewed as competition by the Opéra and the Comédie-Française, and restrictions were again more strictly enforced. The troupes at the Foire Saint-Germain and the Foire Saint-Laurent received warnings from the police in 1699 and 1706. Although in 1708 the fairground entrepreneurs Charles Alard and Maurice were able to purchase from the Opéra's director Pierre Guyenet the right to use singers, dancers, musicians, and sets, this did not last as Guyenet died in 1712, leaving the Opéra with a debt in the neighborhood of 400,000 livres. Alard resorted to giving silent performances with the actors' speeches displayed to the audience on large cue cards. The players next tried including vaudeville airs via audience participation: the musicians would play a popular tune, and the spectators would sing, while the actors remained silent. This was further enhanced when the words began to be displayed to the audience on a large banner.

== Foundation and early history ==
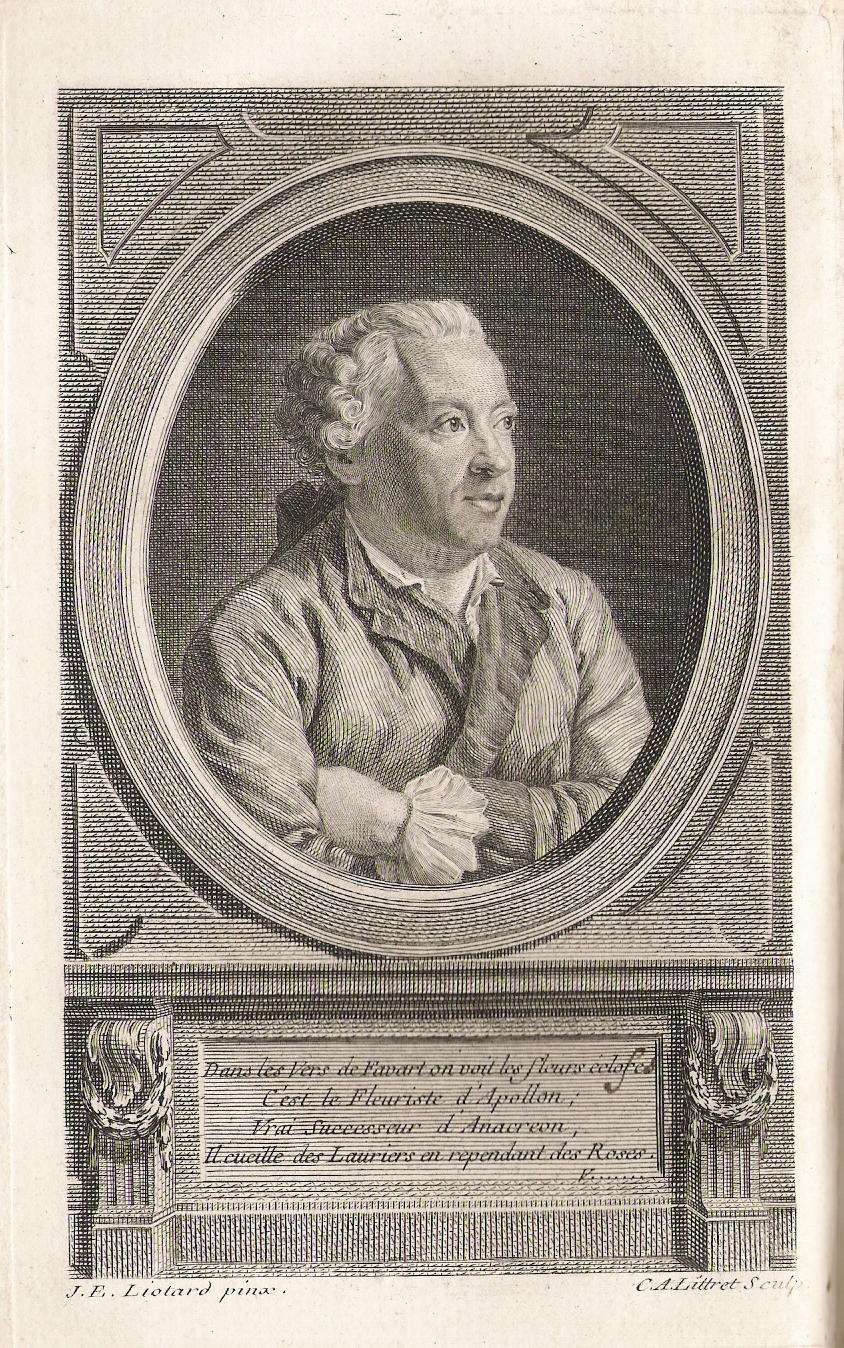
Favart

In 1713 and 1714 several of the fair troupes were able to conclude a new series of agreements with the creditors of the deceased Guyenet, who at this point had become the managers of the rather expensive Opéra. For an annual fee the troupes obtained the right to perform light comedies interspersed with songs and dances and to use sets and theatre machines. They were also given the right to use the name "Opéra-Comique". The first work officially given that designation was Télémaque (a parody of the opera by André Cardinal Destouches), which was first performed by the Théâtre de la Foire Saint-Germain in 1715. The words were by Alain-René Lesage, the music was arranged by Jean-Claude Gillier, and the orchestra consisted of 15 players. Lesage authored many of the early opéras comiques, and composers like Gillier worked primarily as arrangers of existing music. In 1716 one of the troupes' leaders, Catherine Vanderberg purchased additional rights and began to present more original works by authors, such as Jacques-Philippe d'Orneval, Alexis Piron, and Louis Fuzelier. In these early days the role of librettist for the theatre was more important than that of the composer – and pre-eminent among them for more than forty years was Charles-Simon Favart, who made his first contribution in 1734 and achieved his first important success with La chercheuse d'esprit in 1741.

In 1743 the impresario Jean Monnet paid 12,000 livres to the Opéra for the right to run the Opéra-Comique, He renovated the theatre and brought together a group of highly talented creative artists, including, besides Favart, who also worked as a stage director, the comedian Préville, the stage designer François Boucher, and the ballet master Dupré and his pupil Jean-Georges Noverre. Jean-Philippe Rameau may also have been the leader of the orchestra. The company was, however, too successful, and the Opéra refused to renew Monnet's privilege in 1745. After working briefly in Lyon, and mounting unsuccessful productions in Dijon (1746) and London (1749), he was able to repurchase the Opéra-Comique privilège in December 1751 and remained its director until 1757.

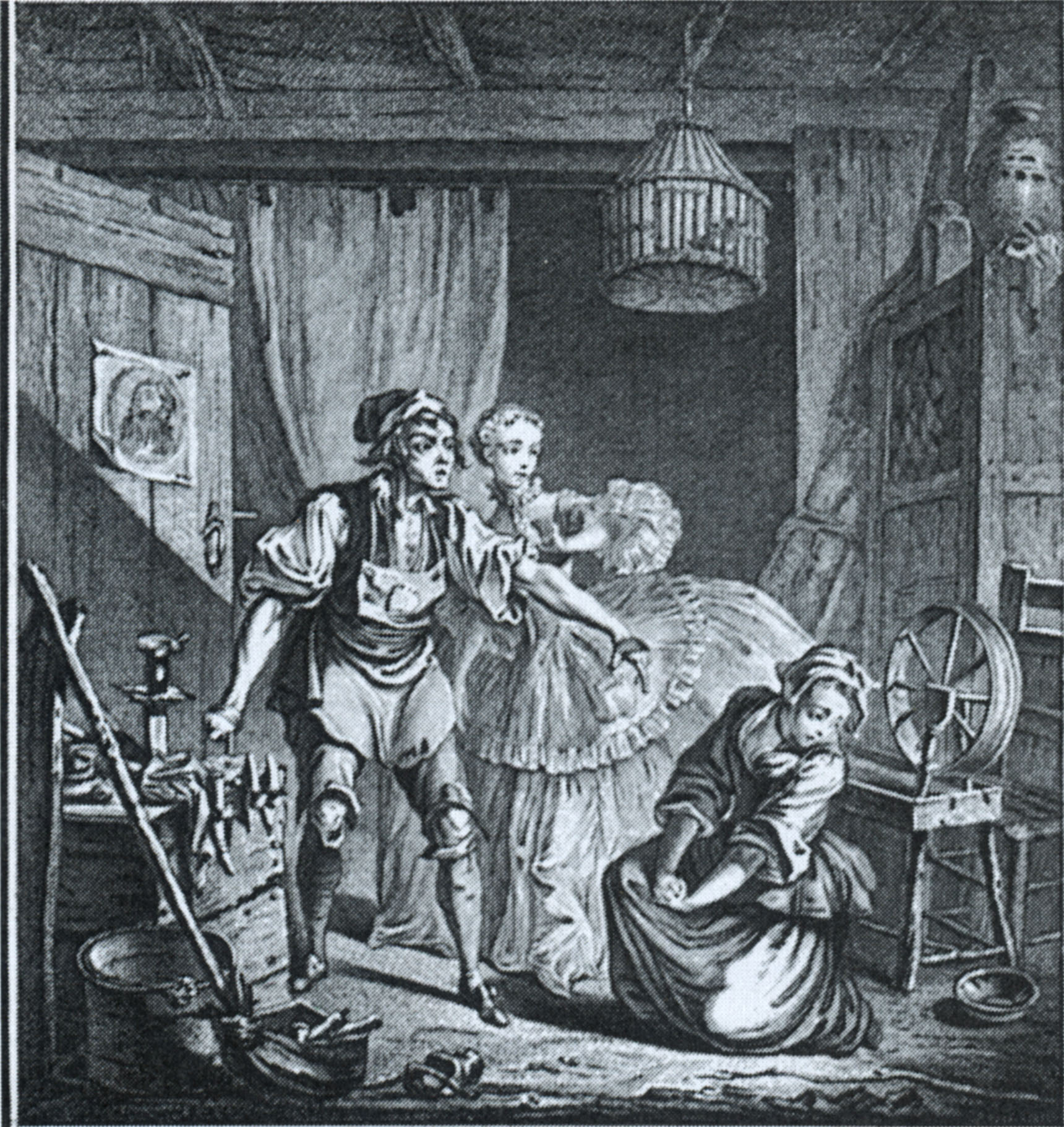
A scene from Le diable à quatre with text by Michel-Jean Sedaine

During his second period as director, Monnet continued to work with Favart and Noverre, and Boucher designed and built a substantial new theatre for the company of the Foire Saint-Laurent in 1752. The theatre was later installed in a wing of the Hôtel des Menus-Plaisirs on the rue Bergère, where it was used by the Opéra in 1781, and then as the first concert hall of the Paris Conservatory, which was founded on the same site in 1795. The new theatre was especially important, as it enabled the company to perform at times when the fair was not in operation. Monnet's friend Jean-Joseph Vadé wrote the libretto for Les troqueurs, first staged in July 1753 and advertised as a translation of an Italian work. The music was actually original, composed by Antoine Dauvergne, and began a period of new works in a more Italian style in which music played a much more significant role. Composers for the company during this period included Egidio Duni, François-André Danican Philidor and Pierre-Alexandre Monsigny.

The dramatist Michel-Jean Sedaine wrote the text of his first opera for the company, Le diable à quatre, in 1756. It premiered at the Fair Saint-Laurent on 19 August with verses for the ariettes provided by Pierre Baurans and with music parodying a variety of composers including Vincenzo Legrenzio Ciampi, Duni, Baldassare Galuppi, and Giuseppe Scarlatti, and also included music attributed to the French composers Jean-Louis Laurette and Philidor. Christoph Willibald Gluck was later to compose his own music for the work. His version was first given in Laxenburg, Austria, on 28 May 1759. Other settings were later composed for the Opéra-Comique by Bernardo Porta (14 February 1790) and Jean-Pierre Solié (30 November 1809).

== 1762 to 1807 ==
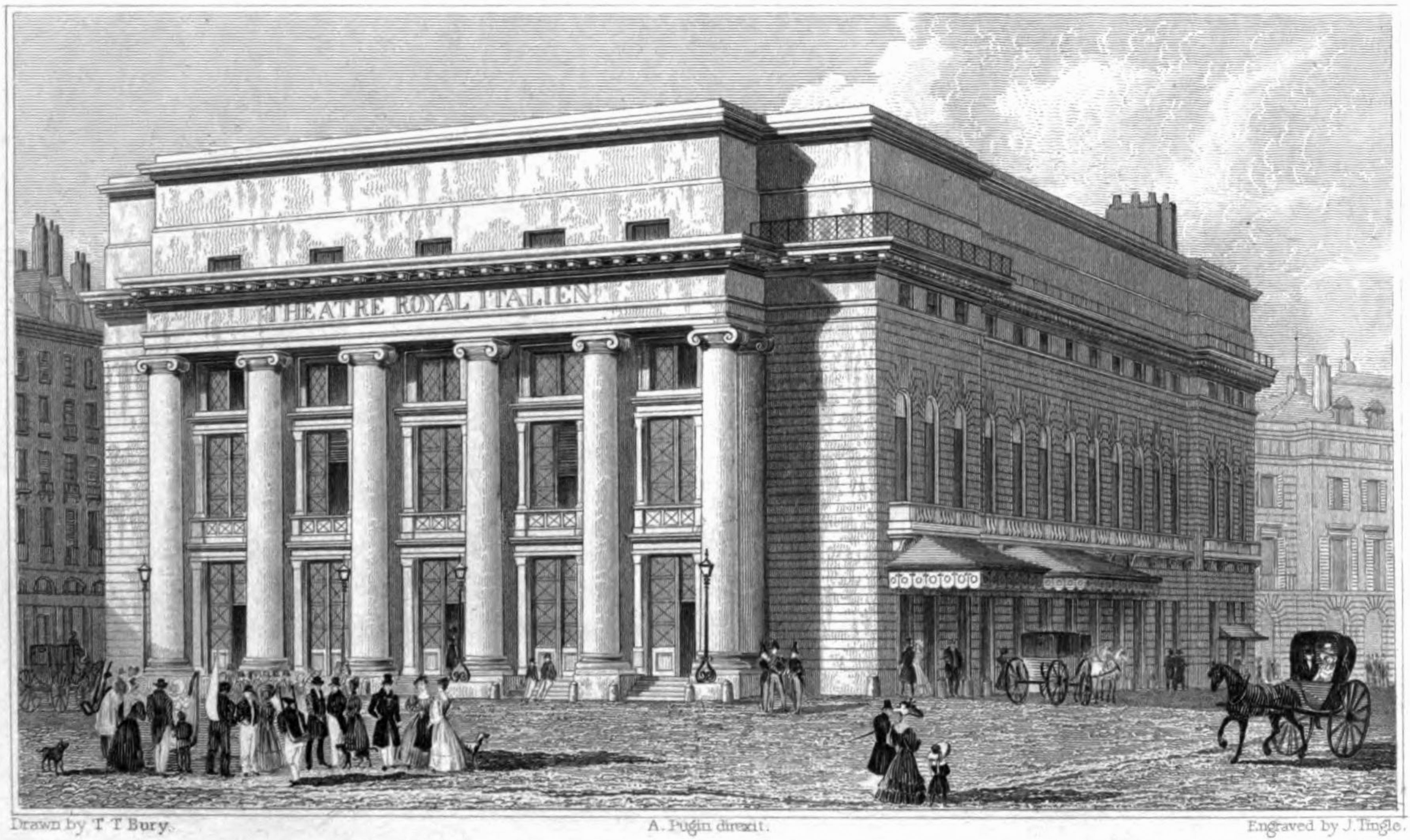
The first Salle Favart which housed the company between 1783 and 1801

On 3 February 1762 the Opéra-Comique was merged into the Comédie-Italienne and occupied the Hôtel de Bourgogne, gaining in respectability what it lost in independence. The company was renamed to Opéra-Comique by an edict of the king in 1780, although the names Comédie-Italienne and Théâtre Italien were still used frequently by the press and public for many years thereafter. In 1783 the company moved again, into the Salle Favart (architect Jean-François Heurtier; ca. 1,100 seats) on the site where the current theatre stands. Around that time the works of Grétry featured strongly.

With the proliferation of opera houses after the Law of 1791 which removed restrictions on the opening of theatres, there was competition with the Théâtre Feydeau, which was resolved in 1801 by merger. By 1807 Napoleon had reduced theatrical freedoms, and the Opéra-Comique was named one of four primary theatres in Paris.

== The 19th century ==
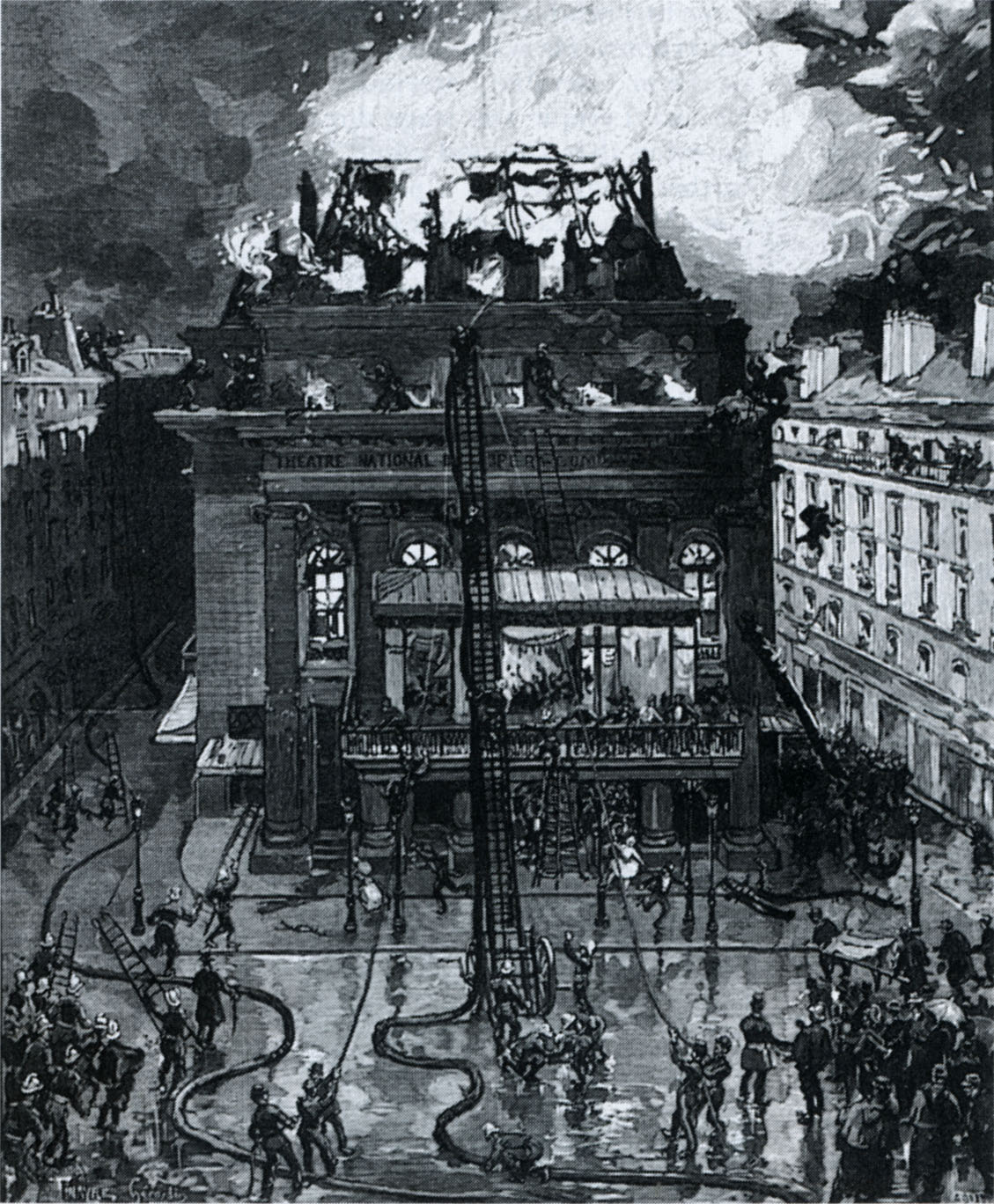
Fire at the second Salle Favart on 25 May 1887 (engraving).

French opéra comique, in the 19th century at least, was not necessarily "comic" either in the classical sense of ending happily or the modern one of being funny; the term covered a much wider category of work. Notable composers in the history of the Opéra-Comique include Auber, Halévy, Berlioz and Bizet. After Rossini's arrival in Paris, new works at the Opéra-Comique took in Italian vocal style and techniques, leading to greater virtuosity, although "the repertory as a whole stood as a bulwark against the italianate invasion of Rossini".

In 1840, the Opéra-Comique company settled in the second Salle Favart (architect Louis Charpentier; 1,500 seats), built on the site of the first theatre, destroyed by fire in 1838. The new house was inaugurated with a revival of Hérold's Le Pré aux clercs. During the 1850s and 1860s the Théâtre Lyrique offered competition in the type of repertoire staged, being particularly strong in its policy of new commissions.

Performances took place on most evenings of the week except for major festivals. Boxes could be hired for a year at a time, and many subscribers were wealthy. Before 1848 a third of subscribers were of the aristocracy, but after then it became an especially middle class theatre. After 1848 Émile Perrin sought to revive the repertoire with more literary and ambitious works. Until 1864 its repertoire was still prescribed, by statute, to have spoken dialogue between musical numbers.

The Opéra-Comique staged the first performances of such important French works as Berlioz's The Damnation of Faust (1846), Thomas' Mignon (1866), and Bizet's Carmen (1875). In the latter part of the century the theatre revived works it had made its own, restaged works from the repertoire of the Théâtre Lyrique (which had closed in 1872) and premiered new pieces, such as Offenbach's Les Contes d'Hoffmann (1881); Delibes' Lakmé (1883); Massenet's Manon (1884), Esclarmonde (1889), and Werther (French premiere in 1893); and Charpentier's Louise (1900).

A fire at the Salle Favart on 25 May 1887 resulted in the death of 84 people by asphyxiation. The building was destroyed and the director Léon Carvalho was forced to resign, although later he was acquitted of blame and resumed the helm at the company from 1891 to 1897. The third Salle Favart (architect Louis Bernier) was officially opened in the presence of President Félix Faure on 7 December 1898.

== The 20th century and beyond ==
As the differences between opéra and opéra comique faded, the two main houses in Paris came more into competition, although the Salle Favart saw the premieres of more innovative works: Debussy's Pelléas et Mélisande (1902), Dukas' Ariane et Barbe-bleue (1907), Ravel's L'heure espagnole (1911), and French premieres of works by Puccini and Falla. Between 1900 and 1950, 401 works by 206 different composers were performed at the Opéra-Comique, of which 222 were either world premieres (136) or the first performance in Paris (86).

In June 1936 a broadcast of Les Contes d'Hoffmann was disrupted by the start of a company sit-in demanding the director's resignation. In 1939 financial problems resulted in the Opéra-Comique being merged with the Opéra to become the 'Réunion des Théatres Lyriques Nationaux'. Notable premieres during this period included Poulenc's Les Mamelles de Tiresias (1947) and La Voix humaine (1959). However, by the end of the Second World War, the Opéra-Comique's best artists, assets and repertory had been gradually taken from it to enrich the Opéra.

The Opéra-Comique discovered some fresh energy in 1950s, restaging Roméo et Juliette, Orphée et Eurydice, Le roi malgré lui and Les noces de Jeannette and introducing Bluebeard's Castle, Landowski's Les Adieux and Dallapiccola's Volo di Notte to attract new audiences and keep the attention of the arts establishment. At the start of the 1960s Stéphane Wolff, claimed that the theatre could regain its independence: "well-managed, it could again become what it was for so long, the most active and therefore the leading lyric stage in France". However, in 1972 the Opéra-Comique company was closed (although the theatre itself received visiting productions) and its government grant added to that of the Opéra.

Although the company of the Opéra-Comique was disbanded (followed 20 years later by the closure of the opéra comique classes at the Paris Conservatoire), from 1978 works were staged again at the theatre, both from its traditional repertoire (Le médecin malgré lui and Werther) as well as more adventurous repertoire: La chatte anglaise in 1984, Denisov's L'Écume des Jours, as well as productions with international stars, including Jessye Norman as Dido in 1984. While still battling for survival the theatre hosted one of the major baroque revivals: Atys, with Les Arts Florissants in 1987. The company regained its autonomy and returned, albeit with an inadequate budget, to the Salle Favart in 1990. Although its budget amounted to less than most provincial French opera houses, the first new director of the independent Opéra-Comique, Thierry Fouquet, attempted to run a balanced programme but handed over in 1994 to Pierre Médecin, who was responsible for the centenary season in 1998 with a new production of Pelléas et Mélisande. The loss of private sponsors led to a policy of musical comedy and operetta under Jérôme Savary from 2000. A decree of November 2004 put the theatre on a new basis, stressing the variety of productions it should mount: "de l'opéra baroque à la création contemporaine et le patrimoine de l'Opéra-Comique".

It currently mounts 7 or 8 operas or opéra comiques (some of them co-productions), with complementary concerts, recitals and exhibitions, each season. In common with many other opera houses the Opéra-Comique also offers relayed performances to cinemas (around France and in Europe); Carmen in June 2009 and Béatrice et Bénédict in March 2010. In 2013 an opera critic was moved to write that of Paris lyric theatres "over the past seven seasons, [the Opéra-Comique] has best succeeded in establishing a particular identity and achieving consistent quality in its productions".

In the summer of 2015 the theatre closed for 18 months for major refurbishment including the costume department, the salle Bizet, and the hall Boieldieu. During the closure a webopera and a fan zone at the UEFA Cup where spectators were invited to sing well-known opéra-comique songs took place. After the works, the theatre reopened in 2017, with the first stage production since the composer's death of Marais's Alcione (on 25 April 2017) with Jordi Savall conducting Le Concert des Nations.

== Theatres used by the Opéra-Comique company ==
| Theatre | Dates used | Notes |
|---|---|---|
| at fairs, seasonally | 1714 – 1762 | operated at the St Germain and St Laurent fairs |
| Hôtel de Bourgogne | 3 February 1762 – 4 April 1783 | merged into Comédie-Italienne; theatre was built in the late 16th century |
| Salle Favart (1st) | 28 April 1783 – 20 July 1801 | first Salle Favart destroyed by fire on 13–14 January 1838 |
| Salle Feydeau | 16 September 1801 – 22 July 1804 | merger with Théâtre Feydeau; kept company name Opéra-Comique |
| Salle Favart (1st) | 23 July 1804 – 4 July 1805 | except Salle Olympique (3–23 October 1804) |
| Salle Feydeau | 2 September 1805 – 12 April 1829 | |
| Salle Ventadour | 20 April 1829 – 22 March 1832 | on the rue Neuve-Ventadour, it was built for the Opéra-Comique |
| Salle de la Bourse | 24 September 1832 – 30 April 1840 | built in 1827 also called the Théâtre des Nouveautés |
| Salle Favart (2nd) | 16 May 1840 – 25 May 1887 | except Salle Ventadour (26 June – 4 July 1853); second Salle Favart destroyed by fire on 25 May 1887 |
| Salle du Théâtre Lyrique | 15 October 1887 – 30 June 1898 | Place du Châtelet |
| Théatre du Château-d'Eau | 26 October – 30 November 1898 | |
| Salle Favart (3rd) | 7 December 1898 – present | Declared a historic monument in 1977. The opening production in 2017, Fantasio, was staged at the Théâtre du Châtelet. |
Sources: "Opéra-Comique" and "Paris" in The New Grove Dictionary of Opera; Wild and Charlton 2005.
Theatres of the Opéra-Comique (engraving for the centenary of the first Salle Favart on 28 April 1883): 1. Salle de la Foire St Laurent; 2. Hôtel de Bourgogne; 3. Salle Favart (1st); 4. Salle Feydeau; 5. Salle Ventadour; 6. Salle de la Bourse; 7. Salle Favart (2nd)

== Notable premieres ==
| Date | Composer | Work | Theatre |
|---|---|---|---|
| 30 July 1753 | Antoine Dauvergne | Les troqueurs | Foire Saint-Laurent |
| 26 July 1757 | Egidio Duni | Le peintre amoureux de son modèle | Foire Saint-Laurent |
| 9 March 1759 | François-André Danican Philidor | Blaise le savetier | Foire Saint-Germain |
| 22 August 1761 | François-André Danican Philidor | Le maréchal ferrant | Foire Saint-Laurent |
| 14 September 1761 | Pierre-Alexandre Monsigny | On ne s'avise jamais de tout | Foire Saint-Laurent |
| 22 November 1762 | Pierre-Alexandre Monsigny | Le roi et le fermier | Hôtel de Bourgogne |
| 27 February 1765 | François-André Danican Philidor | Tom Jones | Hôtel de Bourgogne |
| 20 August 1768 | André Grétry | Le Huron | Hôtel de Bourgogne |
| 5 January 1769 | André Grétry | Lucile | Hôtel de Bourgogne |
| 6 March 1769 | Pierre-Alexandre Monsigny | Le déserteur | Hôtel de Bourgogne |
| 20 September 1769 | André Grétry | Le tableau parlant | Hôtel de Bourgogne |
| 16 December 1771 | André Grétry | Zémire et Azor | Hôtel de Bourgogne |
| 12 June 1776 | André Grétry | Les mariages samnites | Hôtel de Bourgogne |
| 3 January 1780 | André Grétry | Aucassin et Nicolette | Hôtel de Bourgogne |
| 21 October 1784 | André Grétry | Richard Coeur-de-lion | Salle Favart (1st) |
| 4 August 1785 | Nicolas Dalayrac | L'amant statue | Salle Favart (1st) |
| 15 May 1786 | Nicolas Dalayrac | Nina, ou La folle par amour | Salle Favart (1st) |
| 14 January 1789 | Nicolas Dalayrac | Les deux petits savoyards | Salle Favart (1st) |
| 4 September 1790 | Étienne Méhul | Euphrosine | Salle Favart (1st) |
| 15 January 1791 | Rodolphe Kreutzer | Paul et Virginie | Salle Favart (1st) |
| 9 April 1791 | André Grétry | Guillaume Tell | Salle Favart (1st) |
| 3 May 1792 | Étienne Méhul | Stratonice | Salle Favart (1st) |
| 6 May 1794 | Étienne Méhul | Mélidore et Phrosine | Salle Favart (1st) |
| 11 October 1799 | Étienne Méhul | Ariodant | Salle Favart (1st) |
| 23 October 1800 | Nicolas Dalayrac | Maison à vendre | Salle Favart (1st) |
| 16 September 1801 | Adrien Boieldieu | Le calife de Bagdad | Salle Favart (1st) |
| 17 May 1806 | Étienne Méhul | Uthal | Salle Feydeau |
| 17 February 1807 | Étienne Méhul | Joseph | Salle Feydeau |
| 9 May 1807 | Nicolas Isouard | Les rendez-vous bourgeois | Salle Feydeau |
| 22 February 1810 | Nicolas Isouard | Cendrillon | Salle Feydeau |
| 4 April 1812 | Adrien Boieldieu | Jean de Paris | Salle Feydeau |
| 29 March 1821 | Ferdinando Paer | Le maître de chapelle | Salle Feydeau |
| 10 December 1825 | Adrien Boieldieu | La dame blanche | Salle Feydeau |
| 28 January 1830 | Daniel Auber | Fra Diavolo | Salle Ventadour |
| 3 May 1831 | Ferdinand Hérold | Zampa | Salle Ventadour |
| 15 December 1832 | Ferdinand Hérold | Le Pré aux clercs | Salle de la Bourse |
| 25 September 1834 | Adolphe Adam | Le chalet | Salle de la Bourse |
| 16 December 1835 | Fromental Halévy | L'éclair | Salle de la Bourse |
| 13 October 1836 | Adolphe Adam | Le postillon de Lonjumeau | Salle de la Bourse |
| 2 December 1837 | Daniel Auber | Le domino noir | Salle de la Bourse |
| 11 February 1840 | Gaetano Donizetti | La fille du régiment | Salle de la Bourse |
| 6 March 1841 | Daniel Auber | Les diamants de la couronne | Salle Favart (2nd) |
| 6 December 1846 | Hector Berlioz | La damnation de Faust | Salle Favart (2nd) |
| 28 December 1847 | Daniel Auber | Haydée | Salle Favart (2nd) |
| 3 January 1849 | Ambroise Thomas | Le caïd | Salle Favart (2nd) |
| 18 May 1849 | Adolphe Adam | Le toréador | Salle Favart (2nd) |
| 20 April 1850 | Ambroise Thomas | Le songe d'une nuit d'été | Salle Favart (2nd) |
| 4 February 1853 | Victor Massé | Les noces de Jeannette | Salle Favart (2nd) |
| 16 February 1854 | Giacomo Meyerbeer | L'étoile du nord | Salle Favart (2nd) |
| 23 February 1856 | Daniel Auber | Manon Lescaut | Salle Favart (2nd) |
| 4 April 1859 | Giacomo Meyerbeer | Le pardon de Ploërmel | Salle Favart (2nd) |
| 12 May 1862 | Félicien David | Lalla-Roukh | Salle Favart (2nd) |
| 17 November 1866 | Ambroise Thomas | Mignon | Salle Favart (2nd) |
| 23 November 1867 | Jacques Offenbach | Robinson Crusoé | Salle Favart (2nd) |
| 22 May 1872 | Georges Bizet | Djamileh | Salle Favart (2nd) |
| 12 June 1872 | Camille Saint-Saëns | La princesse jaune | Salle Favart (2nd) |
| 24 May 1873 | Léo Delibes | Le roi l'a dit | Salle Favart (2nd) |
| 3 March 1875 | Georges Bizet | Carmen | Salle Favart (2nd) |
| 10 February 1881 | Jacques Offenbach | Les contes d'Hoffmann | Salle Favart (2nd) |
| 14 April 1883 | Léo Delibes | Lakmé | Salle Favart (2nd) |
| 19 January 1884 | Jules Massenet | Manon | Salle Favart (2nd) |
| 18 May 1887 | Emmanuel Chabrier | Le roi malgré lui | Salle Favart (2nd) |
| 7 May 1888 | Édouard Lalo | Le roi d'Ys | Théâtre Lyrique |
| 15 May 1889 | Jules Massenet | Esclarmonde | Théâtre Lyrique |
| 30 May 1890 | André Messager | La Basoche | Théâtre Lyrique |
| 18 June 1891 | Alfred Bruneau | Le rêve | Théâtre Lyrique |
| 23 November 1893 | Alfred Bruneau | L'attaque du moulin | Théâtre Lyrique |
| 24 May 1899 | Jules Massenet | Cendrillon | Salle Favart (3rd) |
| 2 February 1900 | Gustave Charpentier | Louise | Salle Favart (3rd) |
| 20 November 1901 | Jules Massenet | Grisélidis | Salle Favart (3rd) |
| 30 April 1902 | Claude Debussy | Pelléas et Mélisande | Salle Favart (3rd) |
| 10 May 1907 | Paul Dukas | Ariane et Barbe-bleue | Salle Favart (3rd) |
| 5 June 1907 | André Messager | Fortunio | Salle Favart (3rd) |
| 30 November 1910 | Ernest Bloch | Macbeth | Salle Favart (3rd) |
| 19 May 1911 | Maurice Ravel | L'heure espagnole | Salle Favart (3rd) |
| 15 May 1914 | Henri Rabaud | Mârouf, savetier du Caire | Salle Favart (3rd) |
| 25 December 1915 | Xavier Leroux | Les cadeaux de Noël | Salle Favart (3rd) |
| 16 December 1927 | Darius Milhaud | Le pauvre matelot | Salle Favart (3rd) |
| 3 June 1947 | Francis Poulenc | Les mamelles de Tirésias | Salle Favart (3rd) |
| 6 February 1959 | Francis Poulenc | La voix humaine | Salle Favart (3rd) |

== Directors ==
The information in the following list is compiled from Wild, Levin, and Wolff.

1829–1830 Paul-Auguste Ducis
1830, July – 5 August, Jean-François Boursault, Alexandre Huvé de Garel
1830–1831 Alexandre Singier
1831–1832 Émile Lubbert
1832, 14 January – 1 June, Émile Laurent
1832–1834 Paul Dutreich
1834–1845 François-Louis Crosnier, Alphonse Cerfbeer (administrator)
1845–1848 Alexandre Basset
1848–1857 Émile Perrin
1857–1860 Nestor Roqueplan
1860–1862 Alfred Beaumont
1862, 1 February – 20 December, Émile Perrin
1862–1870 Adolphe de Leuven, Eugène Ritt
1870–1874 Adolphe de Leuven, Camille du Locle
1874–1876 Camille du Locle
1876–1887 Léon Carvalho
1887, May to December, Jules Barbier

1888–1891 Louis Paravey
1891–1897 Léon Carvalho
1898–1913 Albert Carré
1914–1918 Pierre-Barthélemy Gheusi, Émile and Vincent Isola
1919–1925 Albert Carré, Émile and Vincent Isola
1925–1931 Louis Masson and Georges Ricou
1931–1932 Louis Masson
1932–1936 Pierre-Barthélemy Gheusi
1936–1939 14 member committee presided by Antoine Mariotte
1939–1940 Henri Busser
1941–1944 Max d'Ollone
1944 Lucien Muratore
1944 (Liberation) 4 member committee: Roger Désormière, Pierre Jamin, Louis Musy and Émile Rousseau
1945–1946 Albert Wolff
1946–1948 Henry Malherbe
1948–1951 Emmanuel Bondeville
1952–1953 Louis Beydts

1990–1994 Thierry Fouquet
1994–1999 Pierre Médecin
2000–2007 Jérôme Savary
2007–2015 Jérôme Deschamps
2015–2021 Olivier Mantei.
2021–2026 Louis Langrée

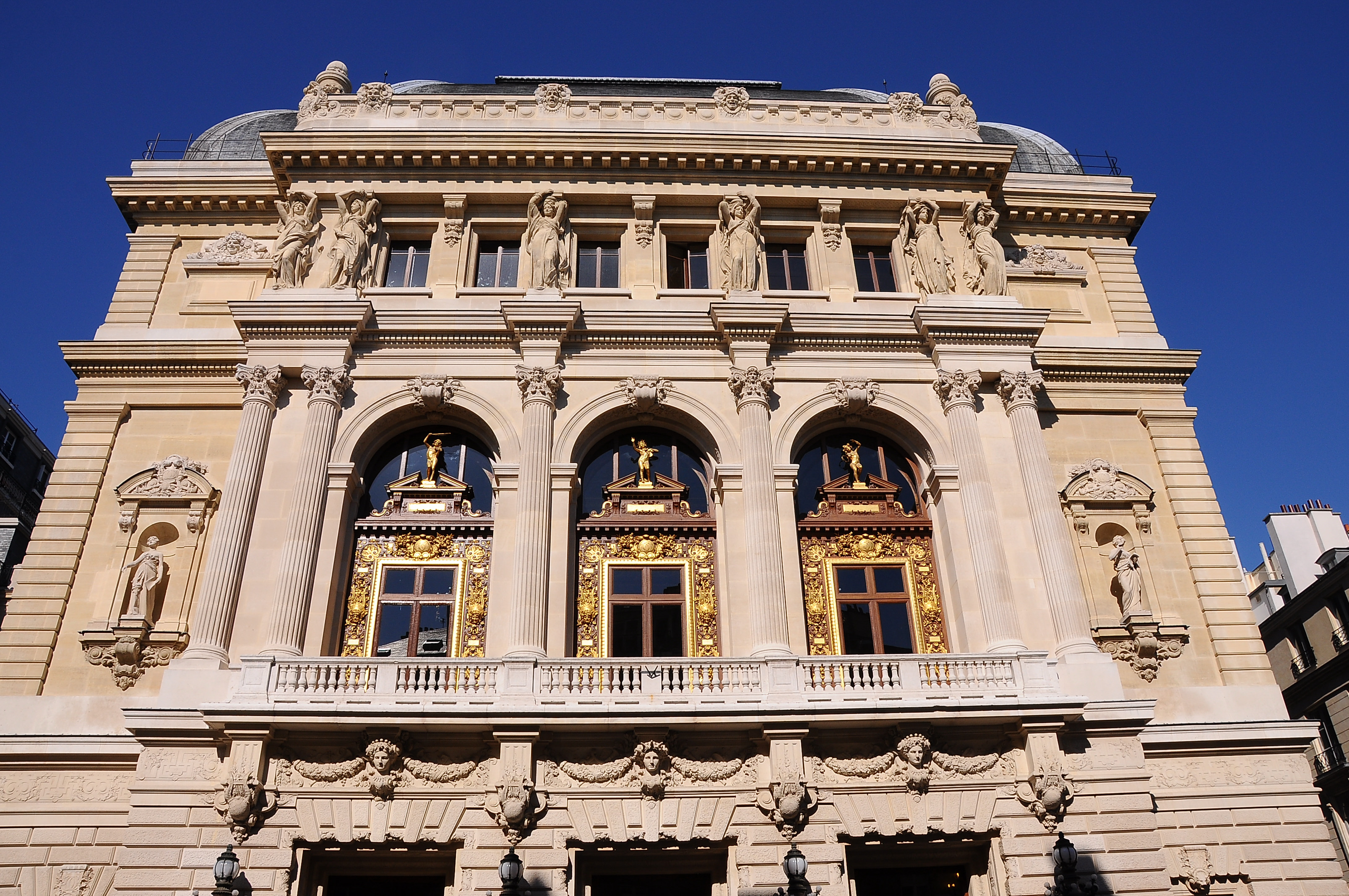
Main façade of the theatre, 2012

== Music directors ==
1849–1868 Théophile Tilmant
1868–1876 Adolphe Deloffre
1876 Charles Constantin
1876–1877 Charles Lamoureux
1877–1898 Jules Danbé
1898–1904 André Messager
1904–1906 Alexandre Luigini
1906–1908 François Ruhlmann
1909 Gustave Doret

1910–1913 François Ruhlmann
1914–1919 Paul Vidal
1919–1921 André Messager
1921–1924 Albert Wolff
1924–1925 Désiré-Émile Inghelbrecht
1925–1932 Maurice Frigara
1932–1936 Paul Bastide
1936–1944 Eugène Bigot
1947–1953 André Cluytens

== See also ==
Frédéric Blasius
