= List of operas by François-André Danican Philidor =

This is a list of operas by François-André Danican Philidor (1726–1795).

One of the early masters of the opéra comique, he wrote 27 works in this genre, as well as 3 tragédies lyriques.

== List ==
Title	Genre	Subdivisions	Libretto	Première date	Place, theatre
Le diable à quatre, ou La double métamorphose, together with Jean-Louis Laruette	opéra comique	3 acts	Michel-Jean Sedaine	19 August 1756	Paris, Foire St Laurent
Blaise le savetier, also as: The Landlord Outwitted or The Cobbler's Wife	opéra comique	1 act	Michel-Jean Sedaine, after Jean de La Fontaine	9 March 1759	Paris, Foire St Germain
L'huître et les plaideurs, ou Le tribunal de la chicane	opéra comique	1 act	Michel-Jean Sedaine	17 September 1759	Paris, Foire St Laurent
Le quiproquo, ou Le volage fixé	opéra comique	1 act	Moustou	6 March 1760	Paris, Comédie-Italienne, Hôtel de Bourgogne
Le soldat magicien	opéra comique	1 act	Louis Anseaume	14 August 1760	Paris, Foire St Laurent
Le jardinier et son seigneur	opéra comique	1 act	Michel-Jean Sedaine	18 February 1761	Paris, Foire St Germain
Le maréchal ferrant	opéra comique	2 acts	Antoine François Quétant, after Boccaccio	22 August 1761	Paris, Foire St Laurent
Sancho Pança dans son isle	opéra comique	1 act	Antoine Alexandre Henry Poinsinet, after Miguel de Cervantes' Don Quixote (1605)	8 July 1762	Paris, Comédie-Italienne (Opéra-Comique), Bourgogne
Le bûcheron, ou Les trois souhaits	opéra comique	1 act	Jean-François Guichard and Nicolas Castet	28 February 1763	Paris, Comédie-Italienne, Bourgogne
La bagarre	opéra comique	1 act	Jean-François Guichard and Antoine Alexandre Henry Poinsinet	4 July 1763	Paris, Comédie-Italienne, Bourgogne
Les fêtes de la paix	opéra comique	1 act	Charles-Simon Favart	4 July 1763	Paris, Comédie-Italienne, Bourgogne
Le sorcier	opéra comique	2 acts	Antoine Alexandre Henry Poinsinet	2 January 1764	Paris, Comédie-Italienne, Bourgogne
Tom Jones	opéra comique	1 act; rev. 3 acts	Antoine Alexandre Henry Poinsinet, after Henry Fielding, revised by Michel-Jean Sedaine	17 February 1765, revised 30 January 1766	Paris, Comédie-Italienne, Bourgogne
Le tonnelier, together with Charles-Guillaume Alexandre, Giovanni Ciampalanti, François-Joseph Gossec, Václav Josef Kohaut, Johann Schobert and Jean-Claude Trial	opéra comique	1 act	Nicolas-Médard Audinot and Antoine-François Quétant, after Jean de La Fontaine's Le cuvier	16 March 1765	Paris, Comédie-Italienne, Bourgogne
Ernelinde, princesse de Norvège, revised as Sandomir, prince de Dannemarck, 2nd rev. Ernelinde	tragédie lyrique	3 acts, 2nd rev.: 5 acts	Antoine Alexandre Henry Poinsinet, after Francesco Silvani's La fede tradita, e vendicata	24 November 1767, revised 24 January 1769 and 11 December 1773	Paris, Académie Royale de Musique, Théâtre des Tuileries, and Versailles (1773)
Le jardinier de Sidon	opéra comique	2 acts	Roger-Timothée Régnard de Pleinchesne, after Il re pastore by Metastasio	18 July 1768	Paris, Comédie-Italienne, Bourgogne
L'amant dégiusé, ou Le jardinier supposé	opéra comique	1 act	Charles-Simon Favart and Claude-Henri de Fuzée de Voisenon	2 September 1769	Paris, Comédie-Italienne, Bourgogne
La Rosière de Salency, together with Adolphe Blaise, Egidio Duni, Pierre-Alexandre Monsigny and Gottfried van Swieten	opéra comique	3 acts	Charles-Simon Favart	25 October 1769	Fontainebleau
La nouvelles école des femmes	opéra comique	3 acts	Alexandre Guillaume Mouslier de Moissy	22 January 1770	Paris, Comédie-Italienne, Bourgogne
Le bon fils	opéra comique	1 act	François-Antoine Devaux and Guillaume-Antoine Lemonnier	11 January 1773	Paris, Comédie-Italienne, Bourgogne
Zémire et Mélide (Mélide, ou Le navigateur)	opéra comique	2 acts	Louis Anseaume [previously attributed to Charles George Fenouillet de Falbaire], based on the poem Le Premiere Navigateur of Salomon Gessner	30 October 1773	Fontainebleau; a version with 3 acts was planned for the Académie Royale de Musique
Berthe, together with H. Botson, François-Joseph Gossec and Ignaz Vitzthumb (lost)	opéra comique	3 acts	Roger-Timothée Régnard de Pleinchesne, after Les deux reines ou Adélaide de Hongrie by Claude-Joseph Dorat and Berthe aus grans piés by Adénès Li Rois	18 January 1775	Brussels, La Monnaie
Les femmes vengées, ou Les feintes infidélités	opéra comique	1 act	Michel-Jean Sedaine	20 March 1775	Paris, Comédie-Italienne, Bourgogne
Protogène	opéra comique		Michel-Jean Sedaine	incomplete and unperformed	
Persée	tragédie lyrique	3 acts	Jean-François Marmontel, after Philippe Quinault	27 October 1780	Paris, Académie Royale de Musique, Théâtre du Palais-Royal
Thémistocle	tragédie lyrique	3 acts	Étienne Morel de Chédeville	13 October 1785	Fontainebleau
L'amitié au village	opéra comique		Desforges (pseudonym of Pierre-Jean-Baptiste Choudard)	18 October 1785	Fontainebleau
La belle esclave, ou Valcour et Zéïla	opéra comique	1 act	Antoine Jean Dumaniant	18 September 1787	Paris, Théâtre du Comte de Beaujolais
Le mari comme il les faudrait tous, ou La nouvelle école des maris	opéra comique	1 act	de Senne	12 November 1788	Paris, Théâtre du Comte de Beaujolais
Bélisaire (3rd act by Henri-Montan Berton)	opéra comique	3 acts	Auguste-Louis Bertin d'Antilly, after Jean-François Marmontel	3 October 1796	Paris, Opéra-Comique, Salle Favart I
