= List of operas by André Grétry =

This is a complete list of the operas by André-Ernest-Modeste Grétry (1741–1813).

== List ==
Title	Genre	Subdivisions	Libretto	Première date	Place, theatre
La vendemmiatrice	intermezzo	2 intermezzi	Labbate	Carnival 1765	Rome, Teatro Albert
Isabelle et Gertrude, ou Les sylphes supposés	comédie mêlée d'ariettes	1 act	Charles Simon Favart, after Voltaire's Gertrude, ou De l'éducation d'une fille	December 1766	Théâtre de Rosimond, Geneva
Les mariages samnites	drame lyrique	1 act	P. Légier, after Le château du prince de Conti by Jean-François Marmontel	January 1768	Paris, Prince de Conti
Le connaisseur	comédie mêlée d'ariettes	3 acts	Jean-François Marmontel	composed 1768, but unperformed	
Le Huron	comédie mêlée d'ariettes	2 acts	Jean-François Marmontel, after L'Ingénu by Voltaire	20 August 1768	Paris, Comédie-Italienne
Lucile	comédie mise en musique	1 act	Jean-François Marmontel, after L’école des pères	5 January 1769	Paris, Comédie-Italienne
Le tableau parlant	comédie-parade	1 act	Louis Anseaume	20 September 1769	Paris, Comédie-Italienne
Momus sur la terre		prologue	Claude-Henri Watelet	1769	Chateau de la Roche-Guyon
Silvain	comédie mêlée d'ariettes	1 act	Jean-François Marmontel, after Salomon Gessner's Erast	19 February 1770	Paris, Comédie-Italienne
Les deux avares	opéra bouffon	2 acts	Charles Georges Fenouillot de Falbaire	27 October 1770	Fontainebleau; revised version: 6 December 1770, Paris, Comédie-Italienne; second revised version: 6 June 1773 Paris, Comédie-Italienne
L'amitié à l'épreuve	comédie mêlée d'ariettes	2 acts	Charles Simon Favart and Claude-Henri de Fusée de Voisenon, after Jean-François Marmontel Contes moraux (1761)	13 November 1770	Fontainebleau; revised version under the title: Les vrais amis, ou L’amitié à l’épreuve op 24 October 1786, Fontainebleau; second revised version: 30 October 1786, Paris, Comédie-Italienne
L'ami de la maison	comédie mêlée d'ariettes	3 acts	Jean-François Marmontel's Le connaisseur	26 October 1771	Fontainebleau
Zémire et Azor	comédie-ballet mêlée de chants et de danses	4 acts	Jean-François Marmontel, after Pierre-Claude Nivelle de La Chaussée's Amour par amour	9 November 1771	Fontainebleau
Le magnifique	comédie mise en musique	3 acts	Michel-Jean Sedaine, after Jean de La Fontaine	4 March 1773	Paris, Comédie-Italienne
La rosière de Salency	pastorale	4 acts	Alexandre-Frédéric-Jacques Masson de Pezay	23 October 1773	Fontainebleau
Céphale et Procris, ou L'amour conjugal	ballet héroïque	3 acts	Jean-François Marmontel, after Ovid's Metamorphoses	30 December 1773	Versailles; revised version: 2 May 1775, Paris Opera
La fausse magie	comédie mêlée de chant	2 acts	Jean-François Marmontel	1 February 1775	Paris, Comédie-Italienne; revised version: 9 February 1775, Paris, Comédie-Italienne; second revised version: 18 March 1776; third revised version: 8 January 1778
Les mariages samnites (rev)	drame lyrique	3 acts	Barnabé Farmian de Rosoi, after Jean-François Marmontel	12 June 1776	Paris, Comédie-Italienne; revised version: 22 May 1782
Les statues	opéra féerie	3 acts	Jean-François Marmontel, after the One Thousand and One Nights	two acts composed 1776–1778, but unperformed	
Amour pour amour		3 divertissements	Pierre Laujon	10 March 1777	Versailles
Matroco	drame burlesque	5 acts	Pierre Laujon	3 November 1777	Paris, Château du prince de Condé
Le jugement de Midas	comédie mêlée d'ariettes	3 acts	Thomas D’Hèle, after Kane O'Hara	28 March 1778	Paris, Madame de Montesson's apartments in the Palais-Royal
Les trois âges de l'opéra; or: Le génie de l’opéra; or: Les trois âges de la musique		prologue	Alphone-Marie-Denis Devismes de Saint-Alphonse	27 April 1778	Paris Opera
Les fausses apparences ou L'Amant jaloux	comédie mêlée d'ariettes	3 acts	Thomas D'Hèle, after Susanna Centlivre's The Wonder, a Woman Keeps a Secret	20 November 1778	Versailles
Les événements imprévus	comédie mêlée d'ariettes	3 acts	Thomas D'Hèle	11 November 1779	Versailles
Aucassin et Nicolette, ou Les mœurs du bon vieux temps	comédie mise en musique	4 acts	Jean-Michel Sedaine, after Jean-Baptiste de La Curne de Sainte-Palaye's Les amours du bon vieux tems	30 December 1779	Versailles
Andromaque	tragédie lyrique	3 acts	Louis-Guillaume Pitra, after the tragedy by Jean Racine	6 June 1780	Paris Opera
Émilie, ou La belle esclave	comédie lyrique	1 act	Nicolas-François Guillard	22 February 1781	Paris Opera
Colinette à la cour, ou La double épreuve	comédie lyrique	3 acts	Jean-Baptiste Lourdet de Santerre, after Charles Simon Favart's Ninette à la cour	1 January 1782	Paris Opera
Électre	tragédie lyrique	3 acts	Jean-Charles Thilorier, after Euripides	composed 1781–1782, but unperformed	
L'embarras des richesses	comédie lyrique	3 acts	Jean-Baptiste Lourdet de Santerre,	26 November 1782	Paris Opera
Les colonnes d'Alcide	opéra	1 act	Pitta	composed 1782, but unperformed	
Thalie au nouveau théâtre		prologue	Jean-Michel Sedaine	28 April 1783	Paris, Comédie-Italienne
La caravane du Caire	opéra-ballet	3 acts	Étienne Morel de Chédeville	30 October 1783	Fontainebleau
Théodore et Paulin	comédie lyrique	3 acts	Pierre Jean Baptiste Choudard Desforges	5 March 1784	Versailles
L'épreuve villageoise	opéra bouffon	2 acts	Pierre Jean Baptiste Choudard Desforges	24 June 1784	Paris, Comédie-Italienne
Richard Coeur-de-lion	comédie mise en musique	3 acts	Jean-Michel Sedaine	21 October 1784	Paris, Comédie-Italienne
Panurge dans l'île des lanternes	comédie lyrique	3 acts	Étienne Morel de Chédeville, after François Parfaict	25 January 1785	Paris Opera
Oedipe à Colonne	tragédie lyrique	3 acts	Nicolas-François Giullard, after Sophocles	composed 1785, but unperformed	
Amphitryon	opéra	3 acts	Jean-Michel Sedaine, after Amphitryon by Molière	15 March 1786	Versailles
Le mariage d'Antonio (in collaboration with Angélique-Dorothée-Lucie Grétry)				29 July 1786	Paris
Les méprises par ressemblance	comédie mêlée d'ariettes	3 acts	Joseph Patrat, after Titus Maccius Plautus's Menaechmi	7 November 1786	Fontainebleau
Le comte d'Albert	drame mise en musique	2 acts	Jean-Michel Sedaine, after Jean de La Fontaine	13 November 1786	Fontainebleau
Toinette et Louis (in collaboration with Angélique-Dorothée-Lucie Grétry)				23 March 1787	Paris
Le prisonnier anglais	comédie mêlée d'ariettes	3 acts	François Guillaume Fouques, called Desfontaines	26 December 1787	Paris, Comédie-Italienne
Le rival confident	comédie mise en musique	2 acts	Nicolas-Julien Forgeot	26 June 1788	Paris, Comédie-Italienne
Raoul Barbe-Bleue	comédie mise en musique	3 acts	Jean-Michel Sedaine, after Charles Perrault	2 March 1789	Paris, Comédie-Italienne
Aspasie	opéra	3 acts	Étienne Morel de Chédeville	17 March 1789	Paris Opera
Pierre le Grand	comédie mêlée de chants	4 acts	Jean-Nicolas Bouilly, after Voltaire's Histoire de Russie sous Pierre le Grand	13 January 1790	Paris, Comédie-Italienne
Guillaume Tell	drame mise en musique	3 acts	Jean-Michel Sedaine, after Antoine-Marin Lemierre	9 April 1791	Paris, Comédie-Italienne
Cécile et Ermancé, ou Les deux couvents	comédie mêlée d'ariettes	3 acts	Claude Joseph Rouget de Lisle and Jean-Baptiste-Denis Desprès	16 January 1792	Paris, Comédie-Italienne
Basile, ou À trompeur, trompeur et demi	comédie mêlée d'ariettes	1 act	Jean-Michel Sedaine, after Miguel de Cervantes Saavedra's Don Quixote	17 October 1792	Paris, Comédie-Italienne
L’officier de fortune	drame	3 acts	Edmond Guillaume François de Favières	composed 1792, but unperformed	
Roger et Olivier (revised version of Les mariages samnites)	opéra	3 acts	Jean-Marie Souriguère de Saint-Marc, after Roger et Victor de Shabran by Louis d'Ussieux	composed 1792-1793, but unperformed	
Séraphine, ou Absente et présente	comédie mêlée de chants	3 acts	André-Joseph Grétry (the composer's nephew)	composed 1792-1793, but unperformed	
L'inquisition de Madrid (parody on Les mariages samnites and Les deux couvents)	drame lyrique	3 acts	André J. Grétry	composed 1793-1794, but unperformed	
Le congrès des rois (together with Henri-Montan Berton, Frédéric Blasius, Luigi Cherubini, Nicolas Dalayrac, Prosper-Didier Deshayes, François Devienne, Louis-Emmanuel Jadin, Rodolphe Kreutzer, Étienne Méhul, Jean-Pierre Solié and Armand-Emmanuel Trial)	comédie mêlée d'ariettes	3 acts	Antoine-François Ève, called Desmaillot	26 February 1794	Paris, Opéra-Comique
Joseph Barra	fait historique	1 act	Guillaume-Denis-Thomas Levrier Champ-Rion	5 June 1794	Paris, Opéra Comique
Denys le tyran, maître d'école à Corinthe	opéra	1 act	Sylvain Maréchal	23 August 1794	Paris Opera
La fête de la raison; or: La rosière républicaine, ou La fête de la vertu	opéra	1 act	Sylvain Maréchal	2 September 1794	Paris Opera
Callias, ou Nature et patrie	opéra	1 act	François-Benoît Hoffman	19 September 1794	Paris, Opéra Comique
Diogène et Alexandre	opéra	3 acts	Pierre-Sylvain Maréchal	composed 1794, but unperformed	
Lisbeth	drame lyrique	3 acts	Edmond Guillaume François de Favières	10 January 1797	Paris, Opéra Comique
Anacréon chez Polycrate	opéra	3 acts	Jean Henry Guy	17 January 1797	Paris Opera
Le barbier du village, ou Le revenant; music partly from: La rosière républicaine	opéra comique	1 act	André J. Grétry	6 May 1797	Paris, Théâtre Feydeau
Elisca, ou L'amour maternel (revised version: Elisca, ou L'habitante de Madagascar)	drame lyrique	3 acts	Edmond Guillaume François de Favières	1 January 1799; revised version: 5 May 1812	Paris, Opéra Comique (both versions)
Le casque et les colombes	opéra-ballet	1 act	Nicolas-François Guillard	7 November 1801	Paris Opera
Zelmar ou L'asile; or: Les Abencerages	drame lyrique	2 acts	André J. Grétry	composed 1801, unperformed	
Delphis et Mopsa; or: Le ménage	comédie lyrique	2 acts	Jean Henry Guy	15 February 1803	Paris Opera

== Sources ==
- Bartlet, M. Elizabeth C. (1992), "Grétry, André-Ernest-Modeste" (work-list) in The New Grove Dictionary of Opera, ed. Stanley Sadie (London) ISBN 0-333-73432-7
- Some of the information in this article is taken from the related Dutch Wikipedia article.
