= Peter und Ännchen =

Opera

Peter und Ännchen (Peter and Annie) is an opera (singspiel) in one act composed by Ludwig Abeille to a German libretto by Franz Carl Hiemer (1768–1822). The libretto was based on Charles Simon Favart and Marie Favart's text for Annette et Lubin, a comédie mêlée d'ariettes with music by Adolphe Benoît Blaise, which was in turn based on Jean-François Marmontel's morality tale of the same name. In Marmontel's story two orphaned cousins, Annette and Lubin, are raised together and later fall in love. When Annette becomes pregnant, the village priest and the magistrate forbid them to marry on the grounds of incest, but the local lord eventually persuades the Pope to allow the marriage.

Peter und Ännchen premiered on 29 September 1809 in the theatre of the Ludwigsburg Palace near Stuttgart. The opera was popular in Germany in its day and a version of the score for voice and piano was published by Breitkopf & Härtel. It was also performed in Paris in 1810 as Pierre et Annette. Franz Carl Hiemer had written the libretto for Abeille's first opera, Amor und Psyche (1800) as well as the libretti for Carl Maria von Weber's operas Silvana and Abu Hassan.

== Sources ==
- Allgemeine musikalische Zeitung (December 26, 1810). "Recension: Peter und Ännchen", No. 65, p. 1050 (in German)
- Grove, George ed. (1900). "Abeille, Joh. Chr. Ludwig", Dictionary of Music and Musicians, Vol. 1, p. 4. MacMillan & Co. Ltd.
- Hardin, Richard F. (2000). Love in a Green Shade: Idyllic Romances Ancient to Modern. University of Nebraska Press, p. 75. ISBN 0-8032-2394-3
- Iacuzzi, Alfred (1978). The European Vogue of Favart: The Diffusion of the Opéra-comique. AMS Press, p. 363. ISBN 0-404-60165-0
