= Fram med basfiolen, knäpp och skruva =

Song by the 18th century Swedish bard Carl Michael Bellman

- Art song
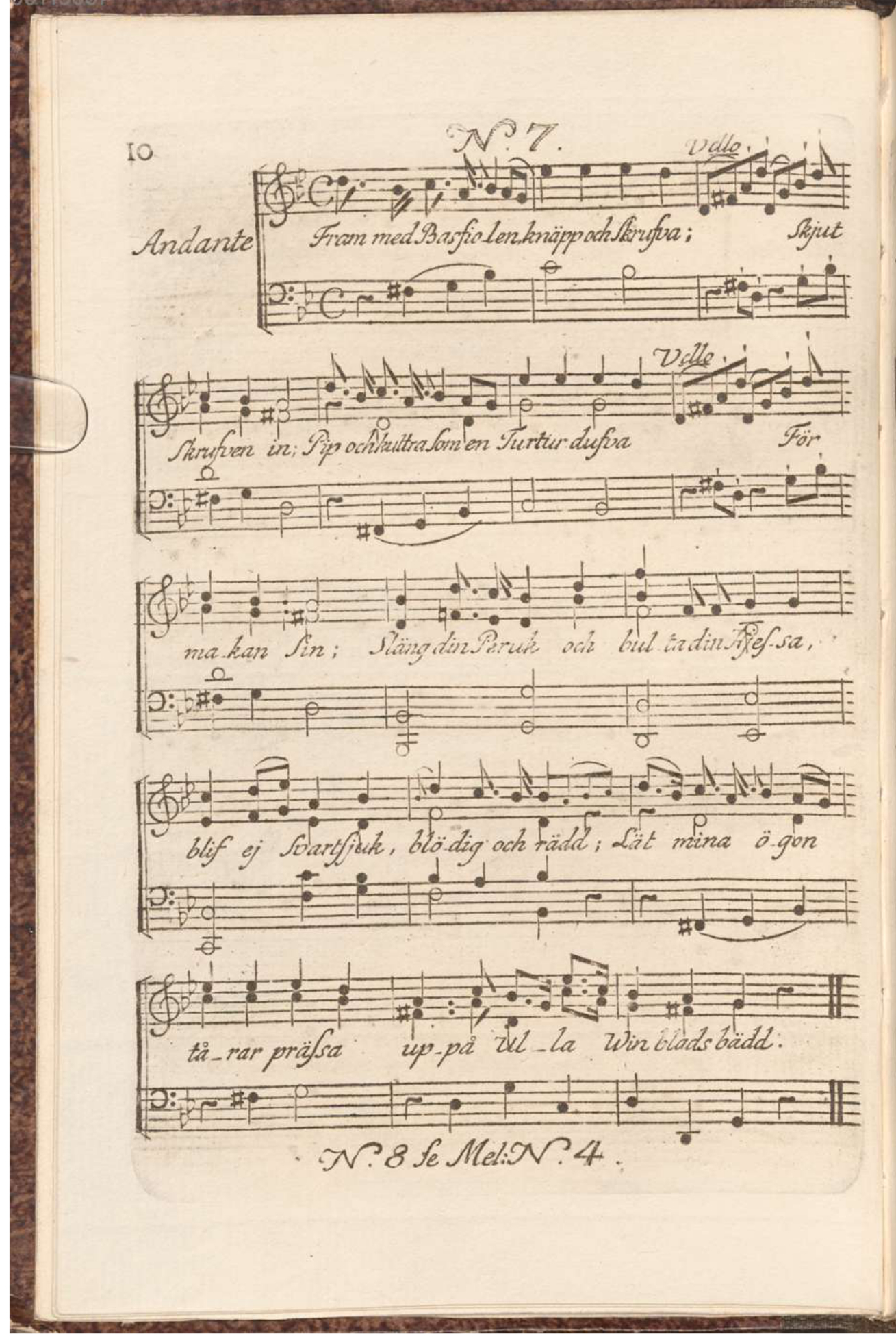
- First page of sheet music, 1810 reprint
- English: Out with the cello, pluck and screw
- Written: 1770
- Text: poem by Carl Michael Bellman
- Language: Swedish
- Melody: An ariette from Justine Favart and Adolphe Blaise's comedy Annette et Lubin
- Composed: 1762
- Published: 1790 in Fredman's Epistles
- Scoring: voice, cittern, and cello

Fram med basfiolen, knäpp och skruva (Out with the cello, pluck and screw) is Epistle No. 7 in the Swedish poet and performer Carl Michael Bellman's 1790 song collection, Fredman's Epistles. The epistle is subtitled "Som synes vara en elegi, skriven vid Ulla Winblads sang, sent om en afton" ("Which seems to be an elegy, written by Ulla Winblad's bed, late one evening"). It describes an attempt by Jean Fredman to have sex with Ulla Winblad, set to a tune from a French operetta, narrated with a combination of biblical allusion and suggestive metaphor. The mention of elegy implies that the song is about death, but the subtext is of the "little death" or female orgasm. Scholars have remarked the epistle's ambiguity, enabling it to work both on a high mythological level and a low worldly level. Similarly, the musician's cello serves both as a musical instrument and as a symbol for Ulla Winblad's body, allowing the singer to mime plucking strings and feeling a woman's body.

== Background ==
Carl Michael Bellman is a central figure in the Swedish ballad tradition and a powerful influence in Swedish music, known for his 1790 Fredman's Epistles and his 1791 Fredman's Songs. A solo entertainer, he played the cittern, accompanying himself as he performed his songs at the royal court.

Jean Fredman (1712 or 1713–1767) was a real watchmaker of Bellman's Stockholm. The fictional Fredman, alive after 1767, but without employment, is the supposed narrator in Bellman's epistles and songs. The epistles, written and performed in different styles, from drinking songs and laments to pastorales, paint a complex picture of the life of the city during the 18th century. A frequent theme is the demimonde, with Fredman's cheerfully drunk Order of Bacchus, a loose company of ragged men who favour strong drink and prostitutes. At the same time as depicting this realist side of life, Bellman creates a rococo picture, full of classical allusion, following the French post-Baroque poets. The women, including the beautiful Ulla Winblad, are "nymphs", while Neptune's festive troop of followers and sea-creatures sport in Stockholm's waters. The juxtaposition of elegant and low life is humorous, sometimes burlesque, but always graceful and sympathetic. The songs are "most ingeniously" set to their music, which is nearly always borrowed and skilfully adapted.

== Song ==
=== Music and verse form ===
Melody of Epistle 7
Epistle 7's melody, from Annette and Lubin

The Epistle was written by 1770, and set to the melody from the ariette "Chere Annette reçois l'hommage" in Justine Favart and Adolphe Blaise's 1762 comic operetta Annette et Lubin. The operetta was brought from Paris the following year, and performed at least 12 times in Stockholm, in French, between 1763 and 1770.

There are five stanzas, each of eight lines. The rhyming scheme is ABAB-CDCD. The Epistle's time signature is 4/4, with its tempo marked Andante; Bellman's original manuscript however is marked Largo.

=== Lyrics ===
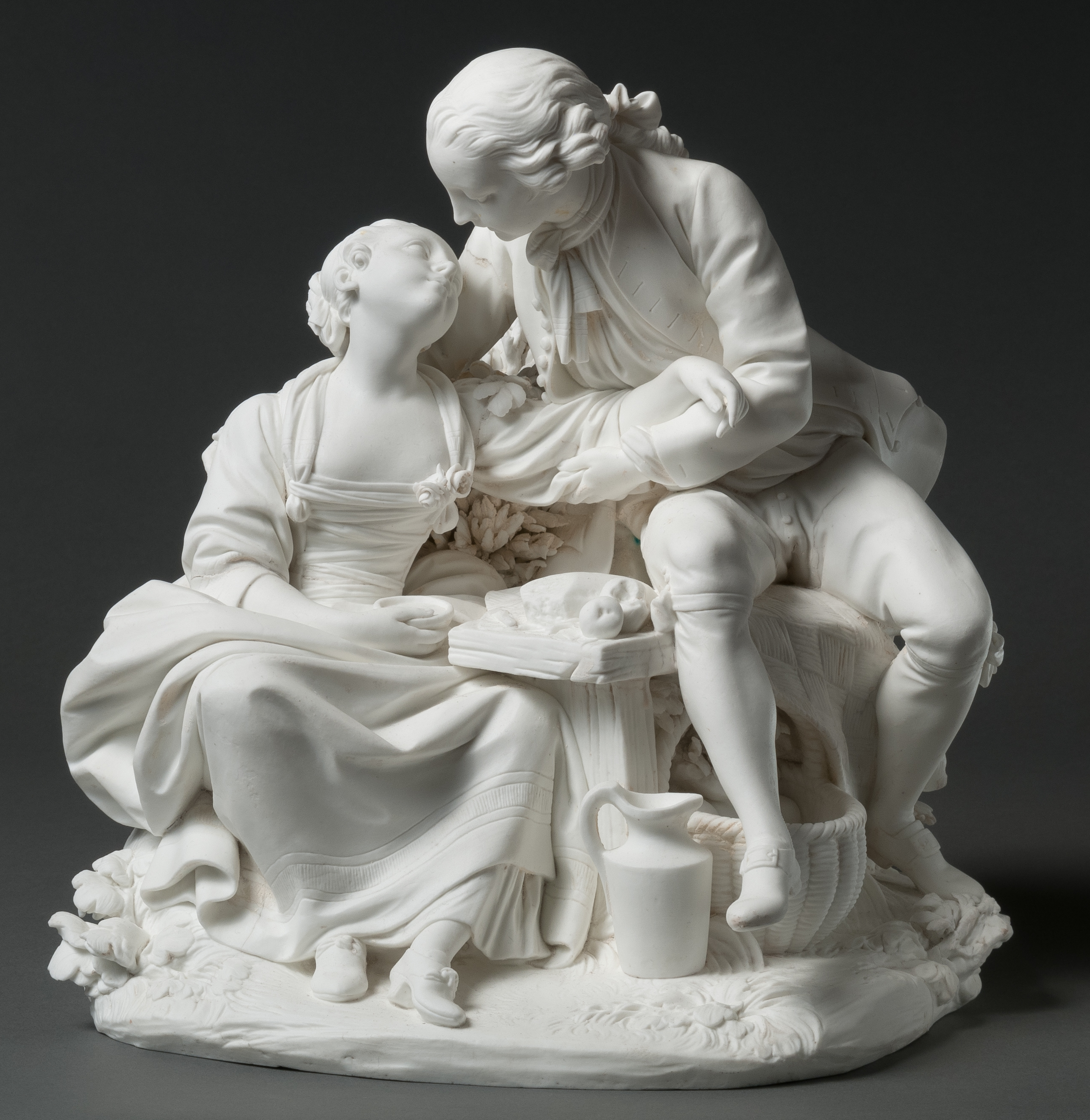
Sèvres porcelain figurines of Annette et Lubin, c. 1764

The subtitle text, "Som synes vara en elegi, skriven vid Ulla Winblads sang, sent om en afton" ("which seems to be an elegy, written by Ulla Winblad's bed, late one evening"), indicates that the Epistle is at least in part a parody, while also erotic in tone, the "death" spoken of being the "little death" or female orgasm. Fredman's intercourse with Ulla Winblad is accompanied throughout by conversation with Father Berg. Yet another metaphor is hinted at with the cello in the opening lines, and mentions of plucking and screwing, as in Epistle 2 Nå skruva Fiolen: its shape, like a woman's back, denotes sexual intercourse. The scholar of Swedish literature Gunnar Hillbom suggests that the Epistle is describing an episode of impotence; Fredman tries to encourage his performance by fantasising. The Epistle ends with phrases like "Now you will 'die', my nymph", suggesting that Fredman has succeeded at last, but that Ulla has given up waiting and gone to sleep.

The first stanza of Epistle 7
Carl Michael Bellman, 1790

Fram med Bas-Fiolen, knäpp och skrufva,
V:cllo - - - - Skjut skrufven in;
Pip och kuttra som en turturdufva
V:cllo - - - - För makan sin;
Släng din Peruk och bulta din Hjessa,
Blif ej svartsjuk, blödig och rädd;
Lät mina ögon tårar prässa
Uppå Ulla Winblads bädd.

Prose translation

Out with the bass violin [the cello], pluck and screw,
Cello - - - - Push the screw in;
Twitter and coo like a turtle dove
Cello - - - - For your wife;
Throw off your wig and pound your head,
Don't be jealous, bloody and scared;
Let my eyes shed tears
Upon Ulla Winblad's bed.

== Reception and legacy ==
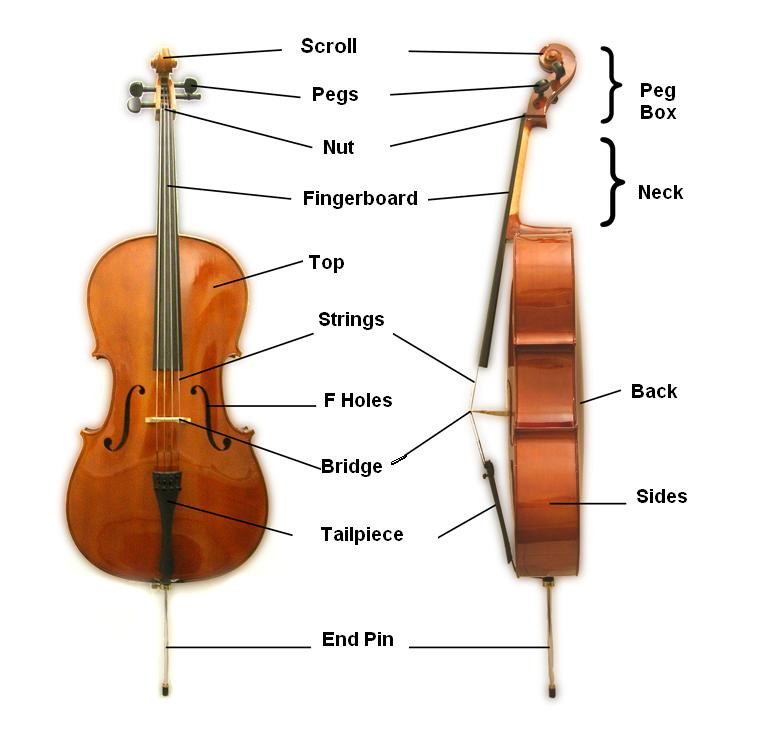
The parts of a cello

The Bellman scholar Lars Lönnroth writes that the Epistle works on two levels, one high, mythological, and the other low, worldly, shabby. Using the biblical language, Bellman succeeded in making something other than his previously simple biblical parodies, creating a sacred atmosphere that puts the parody in the background and the actions are raised to a higher level where the audience can empathize with them. The song takes place at what appears to be Ulla Winblad's deathbed, where Fredman asks Father Berg, accompanying him on cello, for his help. Father Berg is thus both an elegiac musician and a member of Fredman's congregation, while Fredman turns out to be both a metaphorical priest and Ulla's lover. Father Berg's cello also has a dual role, as an instrument and symbol for the female body; during the 18th century, they often had a small sculpted female head above the tuning pegs, as Bellman's cittern did. When Bellman imitated the instrument during the performance, he could therefore also pretend to play it with his hands, which could be interpreted as him bringing his hands over Ulla Winblad's body. This ambiguity is reflected in the text, from the first line.

"Fram med basfiolen, knäpp och skruva" performed by Sune Bohlin

In the first stanza, Lönnroth writes, Jean Fredman tries to comfort Father Berg, but he also seeks comfort himself. Admittedly, Father Berg's playing increases the torment, but Jean Fredman sees the chance to relax with Father Berg's brandy glass. After this Bacchanalian cliché (disguised as elegy) the second stanza assumes the form of the grave number, while the parody reaches greater heights. Ulla's bed becomes both the tomb of the goddess of love and a temple; when beauty throws "her lilies death to prey" it is both an image of the virgin who sacrifices her life, as well as her virginity to the orgasm, "la petite mort". The final line "and my soul is in need" was originally "your soul"; it was probably changed to avoid ecclesiastical criticism: Ulla Winblad's soul would then at the same time be in need of erotic redemption as the extreme unction. In the last two stanzas, both intercourse and ambiguity are completed. The deathbed becomes a wedding bed when Ulla gets her myrtle crown; she then becomes a bride of Christ at the high level, while at the low level she approaches orgasm. Her "song about the fate of virgins" plays on both virgin martyrs and how virgins lose their virginity, but can also be about her exclamation in bed. The last stanza "flesh and blood" as "explain themselves" are taken from the language of Christianity: the first from the marriage form, the latter refers to how souls are liberated from the flesh. This reappears in the last lines, when Jean Fredman wants Ulla to "recover" in the grave as well.

Carina Burman writes in her biography of Bellman that the song is one of the Epistles (along with Nos. 28 and 43) that is sung at students' champagne celebrations in Sweden. The Epistle has been recorded by Cornelis Vreeswijk on his 1971 album Spring mot Ulla, spring! Cornelis sjunger Bellman. It has been translated into German by Klaus-Rüdiger Utschick.

== Sources ==
- Bellman, Carl Michael (1790). Fredmans epistlar. Stockholm: By Royal Privilege.
- Britten Austin, Paul (1967). The Life and Songs of Carl Michael Bellman: Genius of the Swedish Rococo. New York: Allhem, Malmö American-Scandinavian Foundation. ISBN 978-3-932759-00-0.
- Burman, Carina (2019). Bellman. Biografin [Bellman: The Biography] (in Swedish). Stockholm: Albert Bonniers Förlag. ISBN 978-9100141790.
- Hassler, Göran; Dahl, Peter (illus.) (1989). Bellman – en antologi [Bellman – an anthology]. En bok för alla. ISBN 91-7448-742-6. (contains the most popular Epistles and Songs, in Swedish, with sheet music)
- Kleveland, Åse; Ehrén, Svenolov (illus.) (1984). Fredmans epistlar & sånger [The songs and epistles of Fredman]. Stockholm: Informationsförlaget. ISBN 91-7736-059-1. (with facsimiles of sheet music from first editions in 1790, 1791)
- Lönnroth, Lars (2005). Ljuva karneval! : om Carl Michael Bellmans diktning [Lovely Carnival! : about Carl Michael Bellman's Verse]. Stockholm: Albert Bonniers Förlag. ISBN 978-91-0-057245-7. OCLC 61881374.
- Massengale, James Rhea (1979). The Musical-Poetic Method of Carl Michael Bellman. Stockholm: Almqvist & Wiksell International. ISBN 91-554-0849-4.
