= Charles Favart =

Charles Favart may refer to:

- Charles Simon Favart (1710–1792), French dramatist
- Charles Nicolas Favart (1749–1806), his son, French playwright
