= Favart =

Favart is a French surname and may refer to:

== People ==
- Charles-Simon Favart (1710–1792), a French playwright
- Jean-Baptiste Favart (1726–1806), a French général
- Justine Favart (1727–1772), an operatic singer, actress, and dancer, the wife of the dramatist, Charles Simon Favart

== Entertainment ==
- Madame Favart, a French operetta by Jacques Offenbach
