= François Datelin =

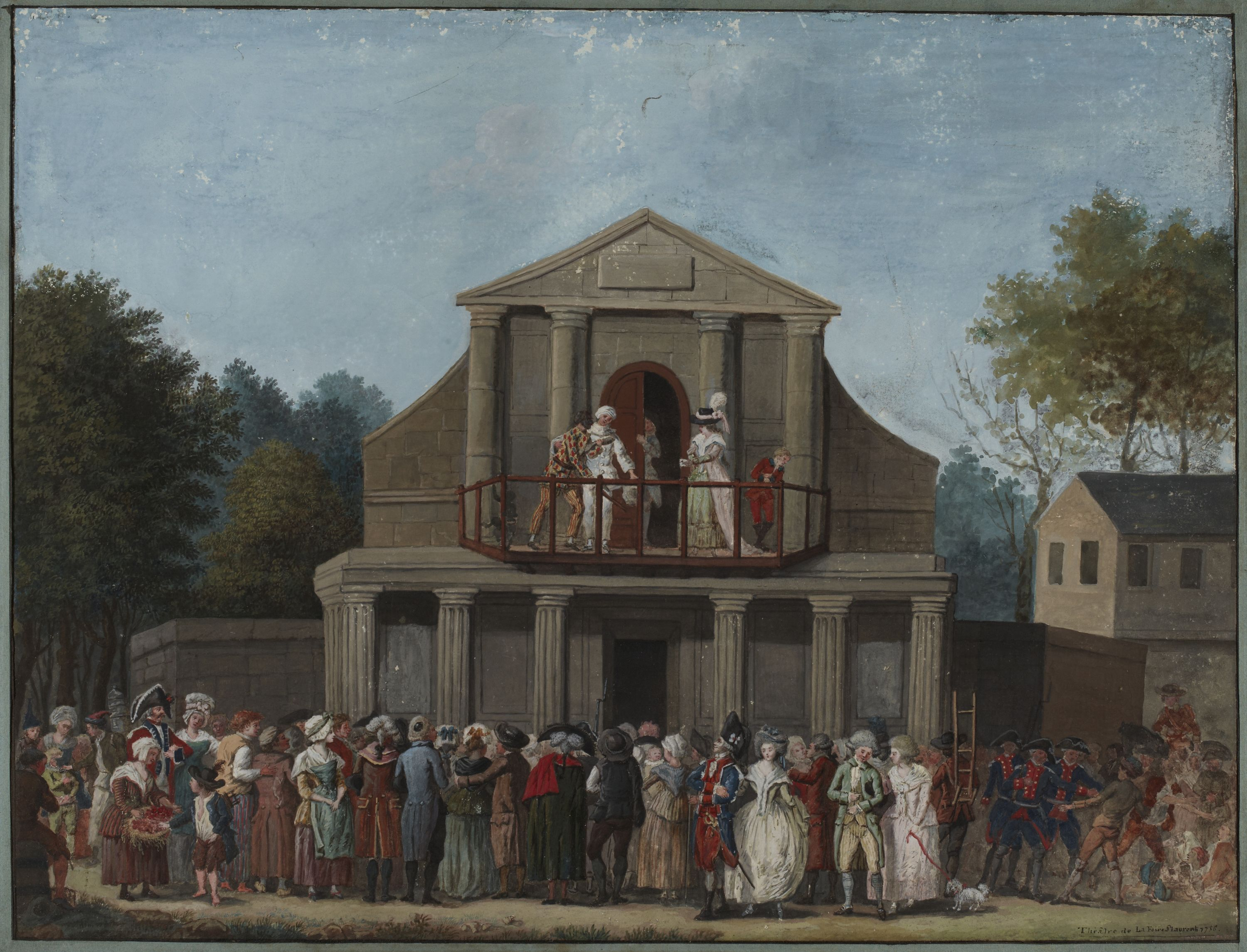
The Foire Saint-Germain after its reconstruction in 1763.

François Datelin, called Fanchon Brioché, was a famous 17th-century French puppeteer.

The son of Jean Brioché, he took over his father's puppets theatre at foires Saint-Laurent and Saint-Germain when the latter died. According to Brossette, he even surpassed his father in the art of making his puppets act and speak pleasantly.

In 1677, Boileau immortalized Brioché's son in his sixth epistle to Racine : "And not far from the place where Brioché chairs…".

It was he whose monkey Fagotin was killed with a sword by Cyrano de Bergerac who had mistaken him for a servant who was making wince to him and gave rise, on the part of his former lover d'Assoucy, to a curious literary work entitled Combat de Cirano de Bergerac contre le singe de Brioché au bout du Pont-Neuf. The name and part of Fagotin, who died in the so uneven duel against Cyrano, survived him and Fagotin was, until the last years of the seventeenth, the obligatory companion of every good puppet manipulator.

== Sources ==
- Gustave Vapereau, Dictionnaire universel des littératures, Paris, Hachette, 1876, (p. 326)
- Charles Magnin, Histoire des marionnettes en Europe depuis l’Antiquité jusqu’à nos jours, Paris, Michel Lévy frères, 1852, (p. 135-42).
- Une famille d'opérateurs-marionnettistes les Brioché
