= Bastien and Bastienne (film) =

Bastien and Bastienne is a 1963 Australian television performance of the opera Bastien and Bastienne by Mozart. Australian TV drama was relatively rare at the time.

It was directed by Christopher Muir, who said: "We will not be presenting the opera as it was originally performed. We will be doing it in a style that will lend itself to TV, but we have, of course, treated the work with great respect to the young Mozart's original intention."

== Cast ==
- George Hegan as Bastien
- Eunice McCowan as Bastienne
- Janet Phillips
- Patricia Gough
- Roland Heimans
