= Jean Brioché =

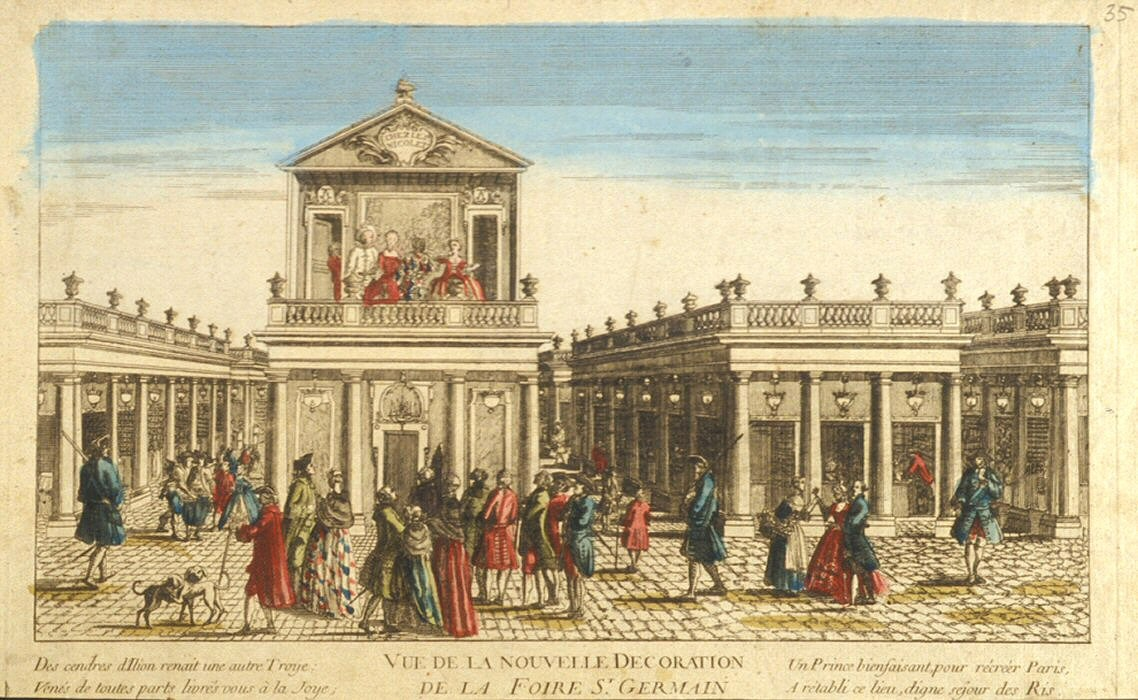
The Foire Saint-Germain after its reconstruction in 1763.

Pierre Datelin, dit Jean Brioché, (c. 1567 – 1671) was a famous French puppeteer.

First a tooth-puller, Brioche opened in Paris in 1650, the first puppet theaters at foires Saint-Laurent et Saint-Germain,

The gaiety and verve of his speeches helped make his name and that kind of entertainment equally popular.

He later went to Switzerland, where he was imprisoned and almost judged as a sorcerer, because the mechanism of his young players couldn't be understood.

Upon retirement, his little theatre was taken over by his son Fanchon, who, according to Claude Brossette, was even more successful than his father.

== Sources ==
- Gustave Vapereau, Dictionnaire universel des littératures, Paris, Hachette, 1876, (p. 326)
- Charles Magnin, Histoire des marionnettes en Europe depuis l’Antiquité jusqu’à nos jours, Paris, Michel Lévy frères, 1852, (p. 135-42).
