= Bastien und Bastienne =

Comic opera by Wolfgang Amadeus Mozart

- one-act singspiel by W. A. Mozart
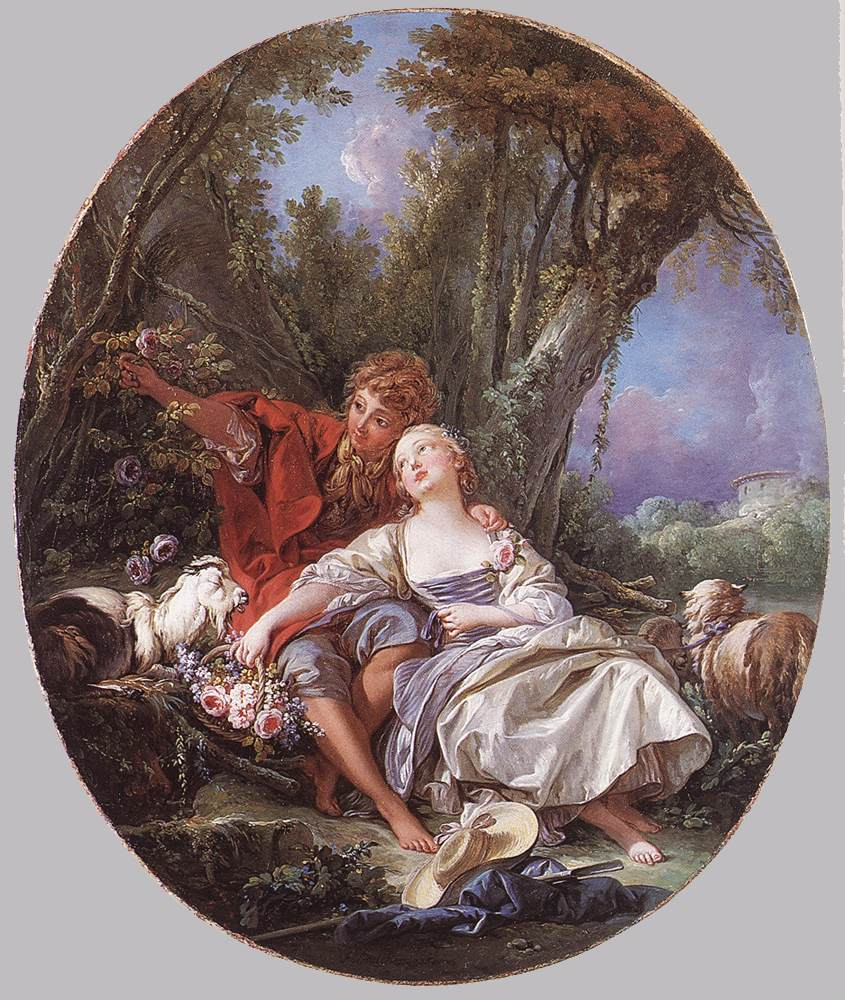
- Shepherd and Shepherdess Reposing (1761), by François Boucher
- Librettist: Friedrich Wilhelm Weiskern; Johann Heinrich Friedrich Müller; Johann Andreas Schachtner
- Language: German
- Based on: Les Amours de Bastien et Bastienne by Justine Favart and Harny de Guerville

Bastien und Bastienne (Bastien and Bastienne), K. 50 (revised in 1964 to K. 46b) is a one-act singspiel, a comic opera, by Wolfgang Amadeus Mozart.

Bastien und Bastienne was one of Mozart's earliest operas, written in 1768 when he was only twelve years old. It was allegedly commissioned by Viennese physician and 'magnetist' Dr. Franz Mesmer (who himself would later be parodied in Così fan tutte) as a satire of the 'pastoral' genre then prevalent, and specifically as a parody of the opera Le devin du village by Jean-Jacques Rousseau. The German libretto is by Friedrich Wilhelm Weiskern, Johann Heinrich Friedrich Müller and Johann Andreas Schachtner, based on Les Amours de Bastien et Bastienne by Justine Favart and Harny de Guerville. After its supposed premiere in Mesmer's garden theater (that is only corroborated by an unverified account of Nissen), it was not revived again until 1890. It is not clear whether this piece was performed in Mozart's lifetime. The first known performance was on 2 October 1890 at Architektenhaus in Berlin.

The opera is written in both the French and German manners. Many of the melodies are French in manner, but Bastienne's first aria is a true German lied. This melody is also used in Mozart's Trio in G for Piano, Violin and Violoncello, K. 564 (1788). Another purely German lied is Bastienne's aria "I feel certain of his heart". Mozart utilizes the orchestra sparingly, with the exception of the reconciliation scene.

The opening theme of Mozart's overture resembles that of the first movement of Beethoven's Symphony no. 3, Eroica (in a different key). It is unlikely that Beethoven was familiar with Mozart's youthful opera. In any case, opening a movement with an arpeggio of the tonic chord was an extremely common occurrence in the Classical period. The resemblance is likely coincidental.

Although he was very young, Mozart already had excellent vocal writing skills and a knack for parody and whimsy which would reach full flower in his later works. Bastien und Bastienne is possibly the easiest to perform of Mozart's juvenile works.

== Roles ==
Role	Voice type	Premiere cast, 2 October 1890 (Conductor: – )
Bastienne, a shepherdess	soprano	
Bastien, her lover	tenor	
Colas, a quack magician	bass	

== Synopsis ==
Place: A pastoral village
Time: Indeterminate

Bastienne, a shepherdess, fears that her "dearest friend", Bastien, has forsaken her for another pretty face, and decides to go into the pasture to be comforted by her flock of lambs.

Before she can leave, however, she runs into Colas, the village soothsayer. Bastienne requests the help of his magical powers to help win back her Bastien. Colas (being a soothsayer) knows all about the problem, and comforts her with the knowledge that Bastien has not abandoned her, rather, he's merely been distracted lately by 'the lady of the manor'. His advice is to act coldly towards Bastien, which will make him come running back.

Bastien is heard approaching, so Bastienne hides herself. Bastien swaggers in, proclaiming how much he loves Bastienne. Colas informs him that Bastienne has a new lover. Bastien is shocked and asks the magician for help.

Colas opens his book of spells and recites a nonsense aria filled with random syllables and Latin quotations. Colas declares the spell a success and that Bastienne is in love with Bastien once more. Bastienne, however, decides to keep up the game a bit longer and spurns Bastien with great vehemence. Bastien threatens suicide, which Bastienne merely shrugs off.

Finally, the two decide that they have gone far enough and agree to reconcile. Colas joins them as they all sing a final trio in praise of the magician.

== Noted arias ==
- "Mein liebster Freund hat mich verlassen" – Bastienne
- "Ich geh' jetzt auf die Weide" – Bastienne
- "Befraget mich ein zartes Kind" – Colas
- "Wenn mein Bastien einst im Scherze" – Bastienne
- "Würd' ich auch, wie manche Buhlerinnen" – Bastienne
- "Grossen Dank dir abzustatten" – Bastien
- "Geh'! du sagst mir eine Fabel" – Bastien
- "Diggi, daggi, shurry, murry" – Colas
- "Meiner Liebsten schöne Wangen" – Bastien
- "Er war mir sonst treu und ergeben" – Bastienne

== Recordings ==
Year	Cast (Bastien, Bastienne, Colas)	Conductor, orchestra	Label Catalogue number
c. 1940	Paul Derenne; Martha Angelici; André Monde	Gustave Cloëz; Orchestre du Conservatoire de Paris	78rpm set: L'Anthologie Sonore; Cat: FA 801-806
1952	Waldemar Kmentt; Ilse Hollweg; Walter Berry	Sir John Pritchard; Wiener Symphoniker	LP: Philips; Cat: ABL 3010
1956	Richard Holm; Rita Streich; Toni Blankenheim	Christoph Stepp; Münchner Kammerorchester	CD: Deutsche Grammophon; Cat: 474 738 2
1957	Three soloists of Wiener Sängerknaben	Edouard Lindenberg; Wiener Kammerorchester	LP: Philips
1965	Peter Schreier; Adele Stolte; Theo Adam	Helmut Koch; Kammerorchester Berlin	CD: Berlin Classics; Cat: 0091292 BC
1969	Thomas Lehrberger; Ileana Cotrubaș; Peter van der Bilt	Leopold Hager; Mozarteum Orchester Salzburg	CD: ORFEO; Cat: C 705061 B
1976	Claes H. Ahnsjo; Edith Mathis; Walter Berry	Leopold Hager; Mozarteum Orchester Salzburg	LP: Deutsche Grammophon; Cat: 2537 038
1976	Adolf Dallapozza; Brigitte Lindner; Kurt Moll	Eberhard Schoener; Bayerisches Staatsorchester	LP: EMI Electrola; Cat: 1C 065 30231
1986	Three soloists of Wiener Sängerknaben: Dominik Orieschnig; Georg Nigl; David Busch	Uwe Christian Harrer; Wiener Symphoniker	CD: Philips; Cat: 422 527-2
1989	Vinson Cole; Edita Gruberová; László Polgár	Raymond Leppard; Franz Liszt Chamber Orchestra	CD: Sony Classical; Cat: 45855
1990	Ralph Eschrig; Dagmar Schellenberger; René Pape	Max Pommer; Rundfunk-Sinfonie-Orchester Leipzig	CD: Berlin Classics; Cat: 0010102BC
1991	Dongkyu Choy; Eva Kirchner; Thomas Müller De Vries	René Clemencic; Alpe Adria Ensemble	CD: Nuova Era; Cat: 7344
2006	Bernhard Berchtold; Evmorfia Metaxaki; Radu Cojocariu	Elisabeth Fuchs; Junge Philharmonie Salzburg	DVD: Deutsche Grammophon; Cat: 000440 073 4244 2
2018	Alessandro Fisher; Anna Lucia Richter; Darren Jeffery	Ian Page; The Mozartists	CD: Signum Classics; Cat: SIGCD547
2019	Tetsuya Mochizuki; Eri Unoki; Masumitsu Miyamoto	Keiko Takata (piano); Mozart Singers Japan (MSJ)	CD: Exton; Cat: OVCL-00745

== See also ==
- List of operas by Mozart
