= Gillot (playwright) =

Gillot was a 17th/18th-century French theatre manager and playwright about whom we have no information except that he wrote farces and puppets plays for the Théâtre de la foire Saint-Germain at the turn of the 17th and 18th centuries. We have four burlesque plays by him whose main character is Pulcinella from the commedia dell'arte:

- 1695: L'Enlèvement de Prosepine
- 1695: Le Marchand ridicule
- 1708: Polichinel Colin Maillar
- ? Polichinel grand Turque
