= Charles-Guillaume Alexandre =

French classical violinist and composer

Charles-Guillaume Alexandre (ca.1735 – 1787 or 1788) was a French classical violinist and composer.

== Biography ==
Born in Paris, Alexandre was a violinist at the Théâtre de l'Opéra-Comique from 1753 to 1755. Master of music at the Dubugrarre School of Music (1760), he became first violin of the Duke of Aiguillon then in 1783, violin teacher in Paris. He wrote operas and instrumental music.

== Works ==
- 1755: Le Triomphe de l'amour conjugal, spectacle orné de machines, lyrics by Giovanni Niccolo Servandoni
- 1756: La Conquête du Mogol par Thamas Kouli-Kan, roi de Perse, et son triomphe, spectacle à machines, lyrics by Servandoni
- 1761: Georget et Georgette, one-act opéra-comique, libretto by Harny de Guerville
- 1764: Dictionnaire lyrique portatif, ou Choix des plus jolies ariettes de tous les genres disposées pour la voix et les instrumens avec les paroles françoises sous la musique, 2 volumes, Didot
- 1765: La Belle Arsène, opéra-comique, lyrics by Charles-Simon Favart, music by Pierre-Alexandre Monsigny, ouverture by C-G Alexandre
- 1765: Les beaux airs ou simphonies chantantes pour deux violons, deux hautbois ou flute, basso fagotto et cors à volonté
- 1765: Le Tonnelier, one-act opéra comique, libretto by Nicolas-Médard Audinot and François-Antoine Quétant, music by Charles-Guillaume Alexandre, Nicolas-Médard Audinot, François-Joseph Gossec, Josef Kohaut, François-André Danican Philidor, Johann Schobert and Jean-Claude Trial
- 1766: Le Petit-maître en province, one-act comedy in verses, libretto by Guerville
- 1766: Premier Recueil d'Ariettes choisies avec accompagnement de guitare par Melle Paisible et de violon à volonté par Mr son frère avec basse chiffrée
- 1767: L'Esprit du jour, comedy by Guerville
- 1770: Concerto d'airs choisis à sept parties. Main violin, concertmaster, second violin, two oboes or flutes, viola viola, bass and two cors ad libitum
- 1771: Romance du Petit maître en province, 1771
- Concert d'airs en quatuor, for two violins, viola and bass or one flute, 4 parts
- 1776: Six Duetto pour deux violons, 2 vol
- undated: Livre d'airs sérieux, tendres et a boire a une et a deux voix avec la basse continue

== Bibliography ==
- J. Goizet, A. Burtal, Dictionnaire universel du Théâtre en France, 1867, p. 25 (Read online)
- Encyclopedia of Performing Arts, vol.1, 1975, p. 290
- Chappell White, From Vivaldi to Viotti: A History of the Early Classical Violin Concerto, 1992, p. 230-231
- Francesco Cotticelli, Paologiovanni Maione, Le arti della scena e l'esotismo in età moderna, 2006
