= Guerville =

Guerville may refer to:

== People ==
- Amédée Baillot de Guerville (1869–1913), French-American journalist and travel writer
- Harny de Guerville (fl. 1758–1766), French playwright

== Places ==
- Guerville, Seine-Maritime, France
- Guerville, Yvelines, France
