= Amor und Psyche =

Amor und Psyche is an opera (singspiel) in four acts composed by Ludwig Abeille to a German libretto by Franz Carl Hiemer(1768–1822). Based on the story of Cupid and Psyche, the opera premiered on January 18, 1800, at the Hoftheater (Herzöglichestheater) in Stuttgart. Amor und Psyche was popular in Germany in its day and a version of the score for voice and piano was published by Breitkopf & Härtel. Franz Carl Hiemer went on to write the libretto for Abeille's third opera, Peter und Ännchen (1809) as well as the libretti for Carl Maria von Weber's operas Silvana and Abu Hassan.

== Roles ==
- Psyche
- Pythia
- Amor (Cupid)
- Mercury
- Alecto
- The King
- 3 Furies
- 3 Genii
- 3 Priests

== Sources ==
- Autenrieth, Johanne et al. (2000). Die Handschriften der Württembergischen Landesbibliothek Stuttgart (2: Codices musici; 2, (HB XVII 29 - 480), Volume 2; Volume 6). Otto Harrassowitz Verlag, p. 11. ISBN 3-447-04241-9
- Grove, George ed. (1900). "Abeille, Joh. Chr. Ludwig", Dictionary of Music and Musicians, Vol. 1, p. 4. MacMillan & Co. Ltd.
