= Adolphe Blaise =

French bassoonist and composer

Adolphe Benoît Blaise was an 18th-century French bassoonist and composer, died in 1772.

He joined the orchestra of the Comédie-Italienne in 1737 and composed the music for Le petit maistre in 1738. In 1743, he was head of the orchestra of the Foire Saint-Laurent and in 1744 of that of the Foire Saint-Germain. From 1753 to 1760, he was director of the orchestra of the Comédie-Italienne and composed many ballets, divertissements, dances, parodies, pantomimes and overall the music for the successful comedy by Justine Favart Annette et Lubin (1762) and two comedies by Favart: Isabelle et Gertrude (1765) and finally La Rosière de Salency (1769).

== Bibliography ==
- Benoit, Marcelle (1992). Dictionnaire de la musique en France aux XVIIe et XVIIIe siècles (in French). Paris: Fayard. p. 73. ISBN 978-2-213-02824-8.
