= Roger-Timothée Régnard de Pleinchesne =

French playwright (18th century)

Roger-Timothée Régnard de Pleinchesne (15 March 1728 – ?) was an 18th-century French playwright.

== Career ==
A former infantry captain and governor of the king's pages, Régnard de Pleinchesne wrote some dramas he presented from 1765 to 1810.

He also founded, in 1781, a facility in the foire Saint-Laurent in Paris called the Redoute chinoise.

=== Works ===
- Le Charbonnier est maître chez lui, ou la Partie de chasse, pantomime (Paris 1775)
- Le Malentendu, French comedy in the Italian genre in thre3 acts, given at the Comédie-Italienne in Paris
- La Vérité, two-act comedy, écrite à la louange du roi et de la reine
- Le Prince Tiri, id.
- Le Fanfaron, id.
- Le B*** tiré, opéra comique
- L'Épreuve de Marivaux, opéra comique
- L'Heureux Engagement, one-act opéra comique
- Le Bon Médecin, five-act opéra comique
- Berthe, comédie héroï-pastorale in three acts and in verse, mingled with ariettes presented at the théâtre de Bruxelles December 1774
- La Guinguette, ambigu-comique
- Le Degré des âges
- Le Jardinier de Sidon, two-act comedy, mingled with ariettes, Comédiens italiens, 18 July 1768
- Le Mariage par exemple ou les Époux à l'épreuve, one-act comedy

== See also ==
- List of French writers
- List of playwrights

== Sources ==
- Émile Campardon, Les Spectacles de la foire, Paris, Berger-Levrault, 1877, p. 304
- Frédéric Faber, Histoire du théâtre français en Belgique depuis son origine jusqu'à nos jours, t. 2, Bruxelles, Fr. J. Olivier, 1879 p. 86
