= Le maréchal ferrant =

Opéra comique by François-André Danican Philidor

- Opéra comique by François-André Danican Philidor
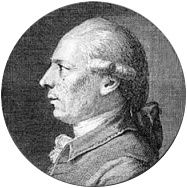
- Portrait of Philidor, London, 1777
- Librettist: Antoine-François Quétant
- Language: French
- Based on: Story from Boccaccio's Decameron
- Premiere: 22 August 1761; Foire St Laurent, Paris

Le maréchal ferrant (The Blacksmith) is a 1761 French two-act opéra comique with spoken dialogue and music composed by François-André Danican Philidor as well as several vaudevilles (popular old songs with new words), which were typically included in opéras comiques of the time. The libretto is by Antoine-François Quétant, after one of the stories in Boccaccio's Decameron (VII, 1), with verses for the ariettes by Louis Anseaume and a plan devised by Serrière.

== Performance history ==
The work was first performed by the Opéra-Comique at the Théâtre de la Foire St Laurent in Paris, on 22 August 1761, and was later performed by the same company at the Hôtel de Bourgogne on 10 February 1762 and for the royal court at Palace of Fontainebleau on 3 November 1762. It became one of Philidor's most popular works, and performances in French followed in cities in many other countries, including Amsterdam in 1762, Vienna on 26 June 1763, Frankfurt on 25 March 1764 (or possibly earlier), Saint Petersburg on 7 October 1764 (where it was the first French opera ever to be performed in Russia), Turin in the spring of 1765, Dresden in 1765, Geneva in 1766, Copenhagen in February 1767, Brussels in 1767, Aachen on 23 July 1768, Ghent on 19 March 1769, Hamburg on 10 February 1769, Liège on 30 October 1770, Warsaw on 1 February 1778, Munich on 7 April 1783, Kassel on 2 October 1784, Cologne in 1796–1797, and even Kingston, Jamaica, on 15 February 1802. The work was also translated and performed in numerous other languages, including German, Danish, Russian, Swedish, English (Boston, 25 March 1793), Spanish and Dutch. It was revived by the Opéra-Comique at the Théâtre Feydeau on 3 April 1802 and at the Théâtre Trianon-Lyrique on 20 November 1920.

== Critical assessment ==
In the view of Julian Rushton, this is Philidor's "most colourful opéra comique, enlivened by mixed metres, parody, onomatopoeia, and inventive ensemble writing." Philidor's music was influenced by Italian models and contrasted strongly with the French folkloric elements characteristic of the vaudevilles. He was an expert chess player with an amazingly detailed memory, and sometimes wrote down music as his own that had actually been composed by others. Charles Burney objected to this, writing in his Journal: "went to the Mareschal Ferrant.... I detest that mixture of old French vaudevilles with Philidor's Italian plunder." However, Charles Simon Favart praised this aspect of Philidor's music, writing: "Our musical savants claim that Philidor has stolen from italians. What does it matter, if he enriches our nation with the beautiful things of foreign lands which we should perhaps never have known without him?"

== Roles ==
Role	Voice type	Premiere cast, 22 August 1761
Marcel, the village blacksmith and surgeon	baritone	
Jeanette, Marcel's daughter	soprano	
La Bride, a coachman	tenor	
Claudine, a village girl	soprano	
Colin, loved by Claudine but engaged to Jeanette	tenor	
Bastien, a peasant	tenor	
Eustache, a peasant	bass	

== Synopsis ==
A village farce involving two young couples, a sleeping potion, mistaken identities etc.
