= Ludwig Abeille =

German pianist and composer

Johann Christian Ludwig (Louis) Abeille (20 February 1761 in Bayreuth – 2 March 1838 in Stuttgart) was a German pianist, organist, conductor, music teacher and composer.

== Life ==
His father was baronial valet and his mother was Christine Louise Abeille, both of whom were employed at the Bayreuth court. Starting at age eleven, he was educated at the Karlsschule in Stuttgart, where his teachers were Antonio Boroni, Ferdinando Mazzanti, and Johann Gottlieb Sämann. In 1782, he became a member of the musicians of the Court at the Duke of Württemberg in Stuttgart. He joined the faculty of Karl's High School (Hohe Karlsschule), a rigorous military academy, in 1786. In 1802, he became concertmaster and later organist of the Court, replacing Johann Rudolf Zumsteeg. In this position, Abeille served as Maestro di Capella to the Duke for several years. In 1815, he became court organist at the court church and director of the Stiftsmusik. He retired in 1832.

Ludwig Abeille was married to Henriette Hedwig née Haug, the daughter of the instrument maker Johann Friedrich Haug and his first wife Christine Dorothea Herdle (1736–1766). Christine was a daughter of the Ludwigsburg court musician Johann Jakob Ferdinand Herdle. Ludwig had seven children altogether, including four girls and three boys.

He wrote several folk songs, concerts, and two operas, Amor und Psyche and Peter und Ännchen, in the same style as Mozart. Abeille also wrote three sonatas for keyboard with accompanying violin (1783) as well as several instrumental works. During his time, he was known for his work Sonata and 9 Variations, which was modeled after Mozart's music. He was also known for his Concerto for Piano 4 hands and Orchestra. His works were known for their melodies and gracefulness and were respected by Carl Maria von Weber.

== Works ==
Abeille wrote piano, chamber and vocal music and also the musical plays 'Cupid and Psyche', and 'Peter and Aennchen'.

- Amor und Psyche, musical play in 4 acts. Libretto by Franz Karl Hiemer. Premièred on 18 January 1800 in Stuttgart, Hoftheater.
- Der Hausmeister, musical play in 2 acts. Premièred in 1805 in Stuttgart
- Peter und Aennchen, musical play in 2 acts. Libretto by Franz Karl Hiemer and Charles Simon Favart Annette et Lubin. Premièred on 29 September 1809 in Ludwigsburg
- Fantaisie für Klavier Op. 4
- Concerto for Piano 4 hands and Orchestra Op. 6
- Sonata for Piano 4 hands Op. 22
- Der Aschermittwoch Op. 11
- Die entschlafene Liebe Lied

== Sources ==
- Allgemeine Deutsche Biographie - online version at Wikisource
