= Le magnifique (opera) =

1773 opéra comique by André Grétry

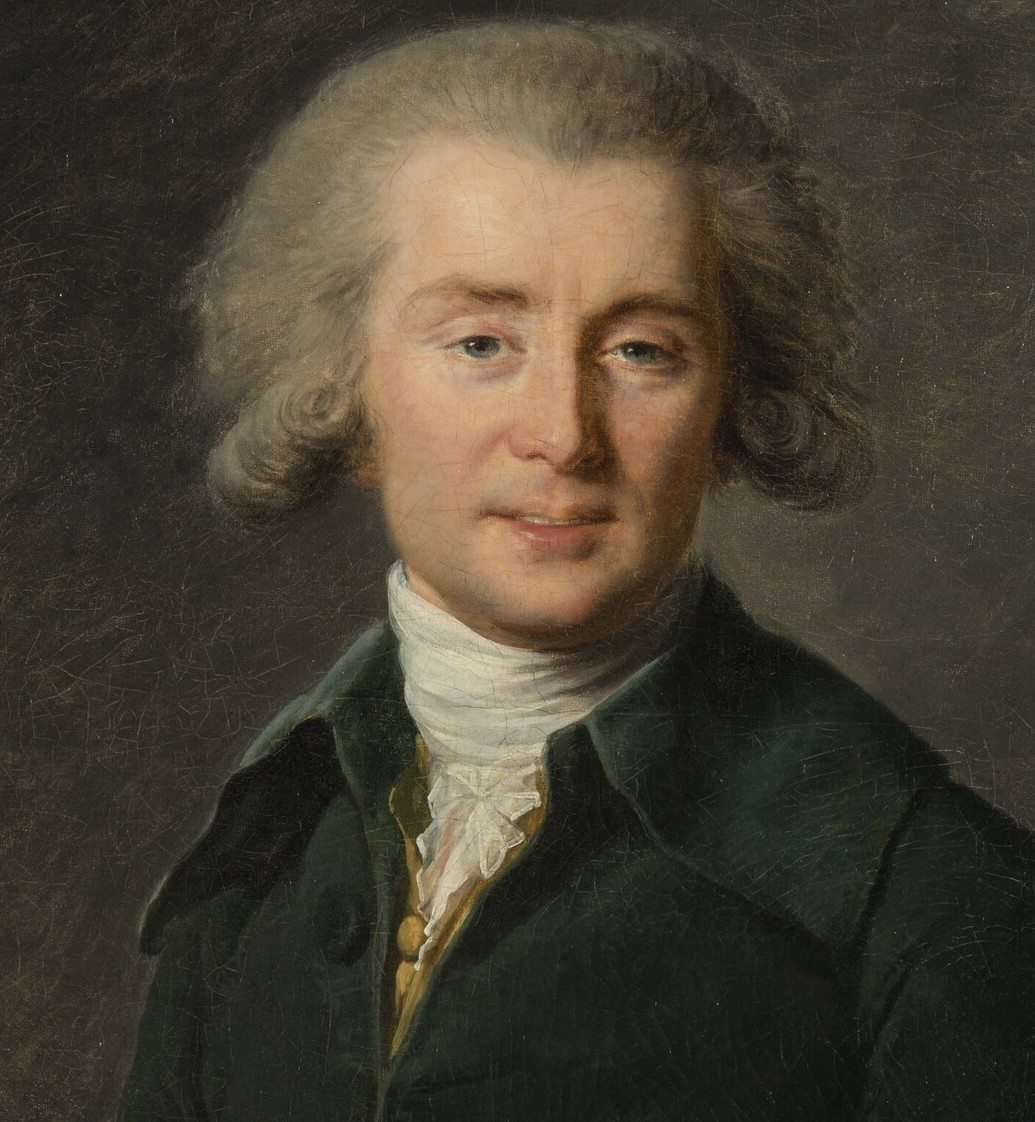
André Grétry

Le magnifique (The Magnifico) is a French-language opéra comique in three acts by André Grétry to a libretto by Michel-Jean Sedaine, after Jean de La Fontaine; it was first performed on 4 March 1773 at Comédie-Italienne, Paris.

== Synopsis ==
The opera opens as a gaggle of captives is processed past the home of Clémentine and her servant, Alix. The master of the house, Clémentine's father Horace, a wealthy merchant of Florence, had been shipwrecked nine years earlier alongside his servant Laurence, Alix's husband. They were taken by pirates and sold into slavery. As Clémentine and Alix watch the captives from their windows, Alix recognizes her husband, Laurence, among them ("C'est lui, c'est lui, c'est lui!"). She suggests that Horace might be with them, telling Clémentine of how they had been freed by Octave (Le Magnifique). As Alix leaves to investigate, she mentions that Clémentine's tutor, Aldorandin, who had been her caretaker in her father's absence, would like to marry her. Clémentine wonders why this proposition does not give her the same joy as the mention of Le Magnifique ("Pourquoi donc ce Magnifique").

At that moment Aldorandin enters the house, declaring his love for Clémentine and asking for her hand. Clémentine refuses, stating that she is too young yet for marriage ("Ma chere enfant"). Aldorandin sends her to her room to reconsider. Meanwhile, Fabio, Aldorandin's conniving servant, arrives to report that Le Magnifique will exchange his best race horse in exchange for fifteen minutes of private discourse with Clémentine. While Fabio praises the horses ("Ah c'est un superbe cheval!"), Aldorandin reflects on his suspicions of Le Magnifiques's intentions. As if his ears were burning, Le Magnifique enters the house to close the deal, and the three men leave together to go see the horse ("Vous m'étonnez, vous badinez").

Once they have left Alix returns, this time with Laurence, who sings of his desire to stay with his wife and never return to the sea ("Ah! si jamas je cours les mers"). Alix leaves to gather food and wine and returns with Clémentine. Laurence tells them how Le Magnifique rescued him and Horace and brought them home, but asked that the men tell no one, especially Aldorandin, of their return. Alix remarks that with the return of Horace, Clémentine will be able to get her father's blessing to marry Aldorandin. Clémentine begins to cry, and tells Alix that she does not wish to marry Aldorandin, but cannot tell her why ("Je ne sais pourquoi je pleure"). Alix offers her support, and she and Laurence leave Clémentine to her thoughts.

When Aldorandin returns with Le Magnifique, he tells Clémentine that she will meet with Le Magnifique in exchange for the horse. He warns her that Le Magnifique will try to seduce her and advises that she remain silent throughout his advances. When Aldorandin leaves her to fetch Le Magnifique, Clémentine sings of her fear of hurting the man she secretly loves, Le Magnifique, with the silence she is forced to keep to assuage Aldorandin ("Quelle contrainte"). Aldorandin and Le Magnifique return and Aldorandin places his rival and Clémentine at one side of the stage while he and Fabio observe from the other, out of earshot. Le Magnifique professes his love for Clémentine, and, realizing her forced silence, tells her to drop the rose she is holding if she would be willing to marry him. She complies and he bows to pick up the rose, then departs to the sounds of Aldorandin's and Fabio's mockery.

Back in her room, Clémentine admonishes herself for her acceptance of Le Magnifique's offer ("Ah! que je me sens coupable!") and recounts the events to Alix. Laurence returns and informs them that Le Magnifique is on his way back to the house and is bringing Horace with him. Clémentine leaves the room while Alix and Laurence sing of their joy of being together again ("Te voilá donc"). As they finish their duet, Fabio enters to tell Alix that Aldorandin has gone to get a notary so he might marry Clémentine without further delay, but when he sees Laurence he suddenly runs away with Laurence following in hot pursuit. Alix, frustrated with her husband's sudden and unexplained departure, attributes it to jealously ("O ciel! Quel air de couroux"). She goes out to look for him while Clémentine sings of her excitement for being reunited with her father and her hopes that he will give her his blessing to marry Le Magnifique ("Jour heureux!"). Alix returns and tells Clémentine to go to her room and wait to be called by her father.

Horace returns with Le Magnifique and sends for his daughter. The two joyously reunite, and Horace promises Clémentine that they will never be parted again. When Aldorandin returns with the notary, he attempts to embrace Horace, but is rebuked as Horace demands to know why Aldorandin never responded to the letters he sent during his captivity. Aldorandin claims to have received none and insists that the care he provided to Horace's daughter and estate should be proof enough of his loyalty. At that moment, Laurence returns, dragging Fabio in by the scruff of the neck ("Ne me bats pas"). He forces Fabio to admit that, on the orders of Aldorandin, he sold Horace and Laurence into slavery. Aldorandin is dismissed from the house and Horace gives his blessing to the marriage of Clémentine and Le Magnifique. The opera ends with everyone singing of the joys of bing a reunited family, with the exception of Fabio who sings of his intentions to flee.

== Recording ==
- Le magnifique, Opera Lafayette, conducted by Ryan Brown (Naxos, 1 CD, 2012)
