= Charles Nicolas Favart =

French playwright (1749–1806)

Charles Nicolas Joseph Justin Favart (17 March 1749 in Paris – 1 or 2 February 1806) was a French playwright at the Comédie-Italienne for two decades. Favard was also an actor at the Comédie Française for fifteen years. Usually known as Nicolas Favart, formally Charles-Nicolas Favart or C.-N. Favart, he was simply Favart fils (Favart Jr) in his time.

Favart was the son of the dramatist, Charles Simon Favart, and was himself a playwright. He wrote a number of successful opéras comiques, such as Le Diable boiteux (1782) and Le Mariage singulier (1787). His son Antoine-Pierre-Charles Favart (1780–1867) was in the diplomatic service, and assisted in editing his grandfather's memoirs; he was a playwright and painter as well.

== Sources ==
- Chisholm, Hugh, ed. (1911). "Favart, Charles Simon s.v. Charles Nicolas Joseph Justin Favart" . Encyclopædia Britannica. Vol. 10 (11th ed.). Cambridge University Press. p. 213.
- Gustave Vapereau, Dictionnaire universel des littératures, Paris, Hachette, 1876, p. 770-1
