= La Rosière de Salency =

Three-act comedy, mingled with arriettes, by Charles-Simon Favart

La Rosière de Salency is a three-act comedy, mingled with arriettes, by Charles-Simon Favart, music by Blaise, Philidor, Monsigny and Duni. It was presented at Château de Fontainebleau 25 October 1769 and at Comédie-Italienne 14 December.

The story draws inspiration from the feast of rosière, a tradition born in the French village of Salency (Oise).

On 18 January 1774, André Grétry had a new version of La Rosière presented at Fontainebleau, with a libretto reworked by marquis de Pezay.
