= Louis-Guillaume Pitra =

Louis-Guillaume Pitra (1735 – 1818) was an 18th-century French playwright and librettist.

A merchant in Paris and chairman of the Provisional Committee of the Police from 1789 to 1791, Pitra wrote for the operas Andromaque, tragédie lyrique in three acts after the tragedy by Jean Racine on a music by Grétry, premiered by the Académie royale de musique, Tuesday 6 June 1780; Apollon et Daphné ou l’invention de la lyre (1782); Clytemnestre, tragédie lyrique by Niccolò Piccinni (1787 but unperformed); les Colonnes d’Alcide (1782); Vénus et Adonis.
