= Andromaque (opera) =

Opera in three acts by André Ernest Modeste Grétry

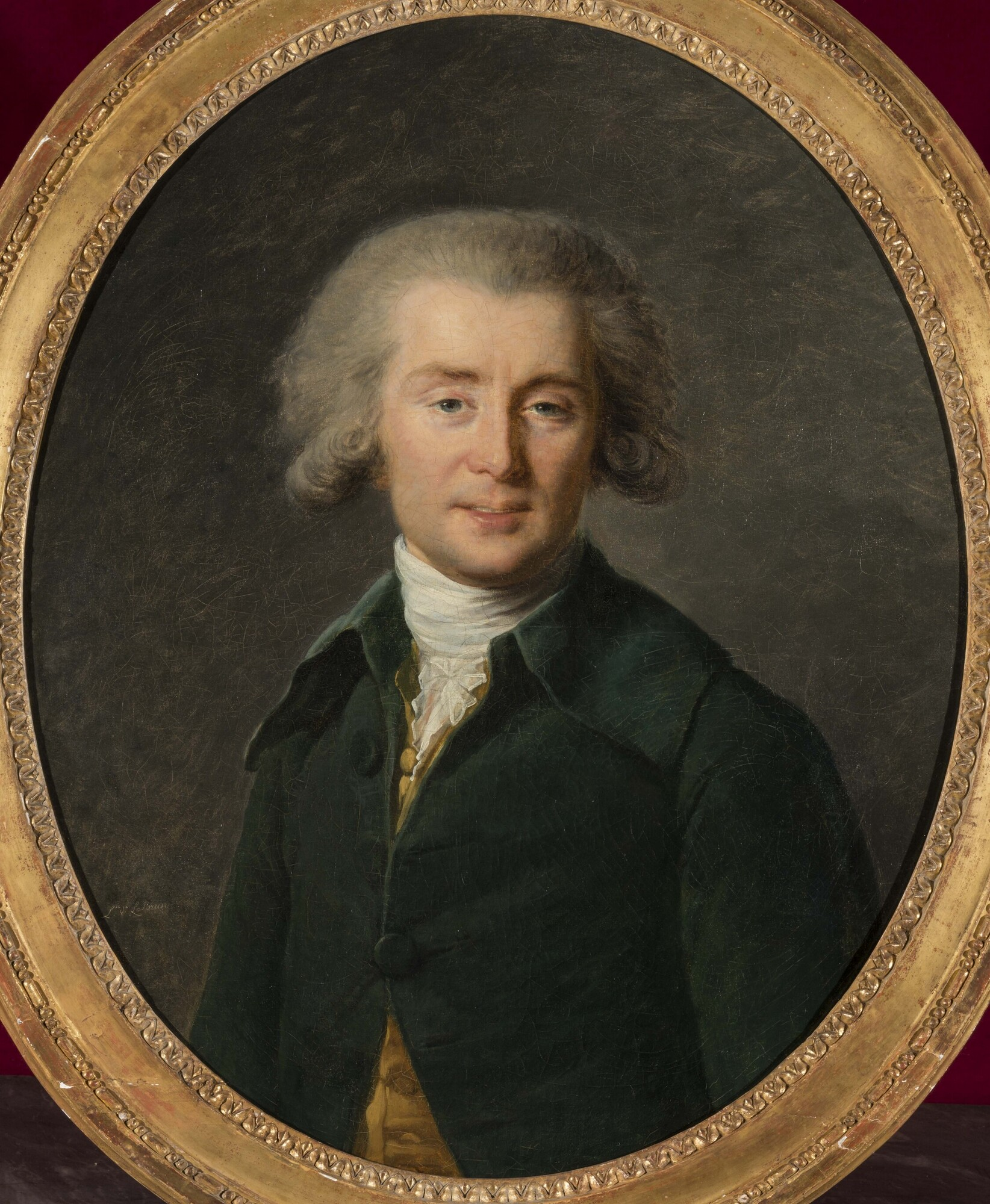
Composer André Grétry

Andromaque is an opera in three acts by the composer André Ernest Modeste Grétry. The French libretto is an adaptation of Jean Racine's play Andromaque by Louis-Guillaume Pitra (1735-1818). It was first performed on 6 June 1780 by the Académie Royale de Musique (Paris Opera) in the second Salle du Palais-Royal. It was the only opera Grétry wrote in the form of a tragédie lyrique.

== Background and performance history ==
Grétry was regarded as the leading composer of opéra comique of his time and Andromaque was his only tragic opera for the Académie Royale de Musique. During the 1770s, Christoph Willibald von Gluck had produced a series of famous works for the Académie, including Iphigénie en Aulide, Armide and Iphigénie en Tauride. The director of the Académie, Anne-Pierre-Jacques de Vismes du Valgay, had in fact initially intended the libretto of Iphigénie en Tauride for Grétry before handing it to Gluck. Grétry was unhappy with this turn of events and so, in compensation, de Vismes offered him the chance to set an adaptation of Racine's Andromaque (1667). This was part of the contemporary fashion for using plays from the French Classical theatre as the basis for libretti; other examples include Gluck's Iphigénie en Aulide (based on Racine), Sacchini's Chimène and Salieri's Les Horaces (both taken from plays by Corneille). Andromaque was a particular challenge since it was one of the most renowned and frequently performed works in the French repertoire. Grétry relied on the poet Louis-Guillaume Pitra to cut down and adapt Racine's tragedy. The composer worked fast on the score, finishing it in 30 days. As he wrote in his memoirs, "The author of the text, Pitra, was with me all the time. Constantly carried along by the beauty and the pace of the action, I wrote it in one go."

The process of putting the finished work on the stage was much slower, however. The Académie Royale de Musique originally intended to perform Andromaque in May 1778, but a dispute arose with the Comédie-Française theatre, which claimed it had exclusive rights to Racine's play. Once this quarrel was resolved, the Académie rescheduled the premiere for April 1780 but again had to postpone it when the soprano Rosalie Levasseur, who was due to play the title role, fell ill. The first performance finally took place on 6 June 1780. Audience reaction was mixed. The work was criticised for having too many choruses, too few dances and too tragic an ending. Critics disliked Grétry's change of style from the lightness of his opéras comiques. For example, La Harpe complained that Grétry had "left his habitual genre for that of Gluck, a desertion that is not to his advantage. In this work there is nothing but shrill and tedious noise, and all the failings of Gluck without the presence of what redeems them to some extent, that is to say, expressive pieces and an understanding of theatrical effect." Grétry responded by revising the third act of Andromaque by adding a spectacular wedding celebration to provide a happy ending. This second version was performed in 1781 to greater success, but its run was cut short by a serious fire at the opera house and Andromaque was never revived in France.

== Roles ==
Cast	Voice type	Premiere: 6 June 1780
Andromaque (Andromache)	soprano	Rosalie Levasseur
Pyrrhus	tenor	Joseph Legros
Hermione	soprano	Marie-Joséphine Laguerre
Oreste (Orestes)	baritone	Henri Larrivée
Phoenix		

== Synopsis ==
This is a synopsis of the first version (June 1780).

=== Act 1 ===
Scene: the palace of Pyrrhus

Hermione is in love with Pyrrhus, her fiancé, but he is in love with Andromaque, the widow of the Trojan hero Hector whom he is holding captive. The Greeks, led by Oreste (who is in love with Hermione) want to put Andromaque and Hector's son Astyanax to death to prevent him ever taking revenge for the fall of Troy when he grows up. Pyrrhus refuses to comply with their request, but this fails to win him Andromaque's love, and he turns to Hermione instead.

=== Act 2 ===
Scene: The port

Oreste is furious with Pyrrhus and plans to carry off Hermione for himself. Hermione rejects Andromaque's pleas to save her son. Andromaque again begs Pyrrhus to spare Astyanax. Pyrrhus says he will do so only if Andromaque agrees to marry him. Andromaque consents but decides to kill herself before the wedding can take place. When Hermione hears the news that Pyrrhus now means to marry Andromaque she is outraged and orders Oreste to kill Pyrrhus.

=== Act 3 ===
Scene: Hector's tomb

Andromaque comes to pray at Hector's tomb for the last time. At the wedding ceremony for Pyrrhus and Andromaque, Pyrrhus declares he will be a good father to Astyanax and will make him King of Troy. This spurs the furious Greeks into killing Pyrrhus. Oreste announces Pyrrhus's death to Hermione who is horrified and disclaims any responsibility. She stabs herself over Pyrrhus's corpse. The rejected Oreste is plunged into despair and goes mad.

== Recording ==
- Andromaque Karine Deshayes, Maria Riccarda Wesseling, Sébastien Guèze, Tassis Christoyannis, Chorus and Orchestra of Le Concert Spirituel, conducted by Hervé Niquet (Glossa, 2010)

== Sources ==
- Booklet notes to the Niquet recording
