= Alexandre-Frédéric-Jacques Masson de Pezay =

French soldier, courtier and man of letters

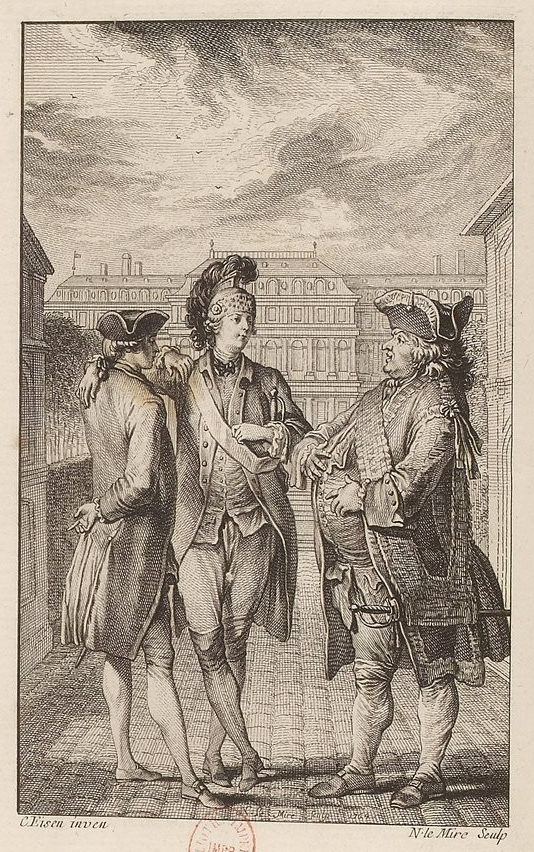
- Pezay, wearing a dragoon uniform (center), with Dorat on the left.
- Born: 27 April 1741; Versailles, France
- Died: 6 December 1777 (aged 36); Château de Pezay, France
- Occupations: Soldier; Courtesan; Man of letters and poet
- Style: Rococo

Alexandre-Frédéric-Jacques Masson, marquis de Pezay, (27 April 1741 – 6 December 1777) was an 18th-century French soldier, courtier and man of letters.

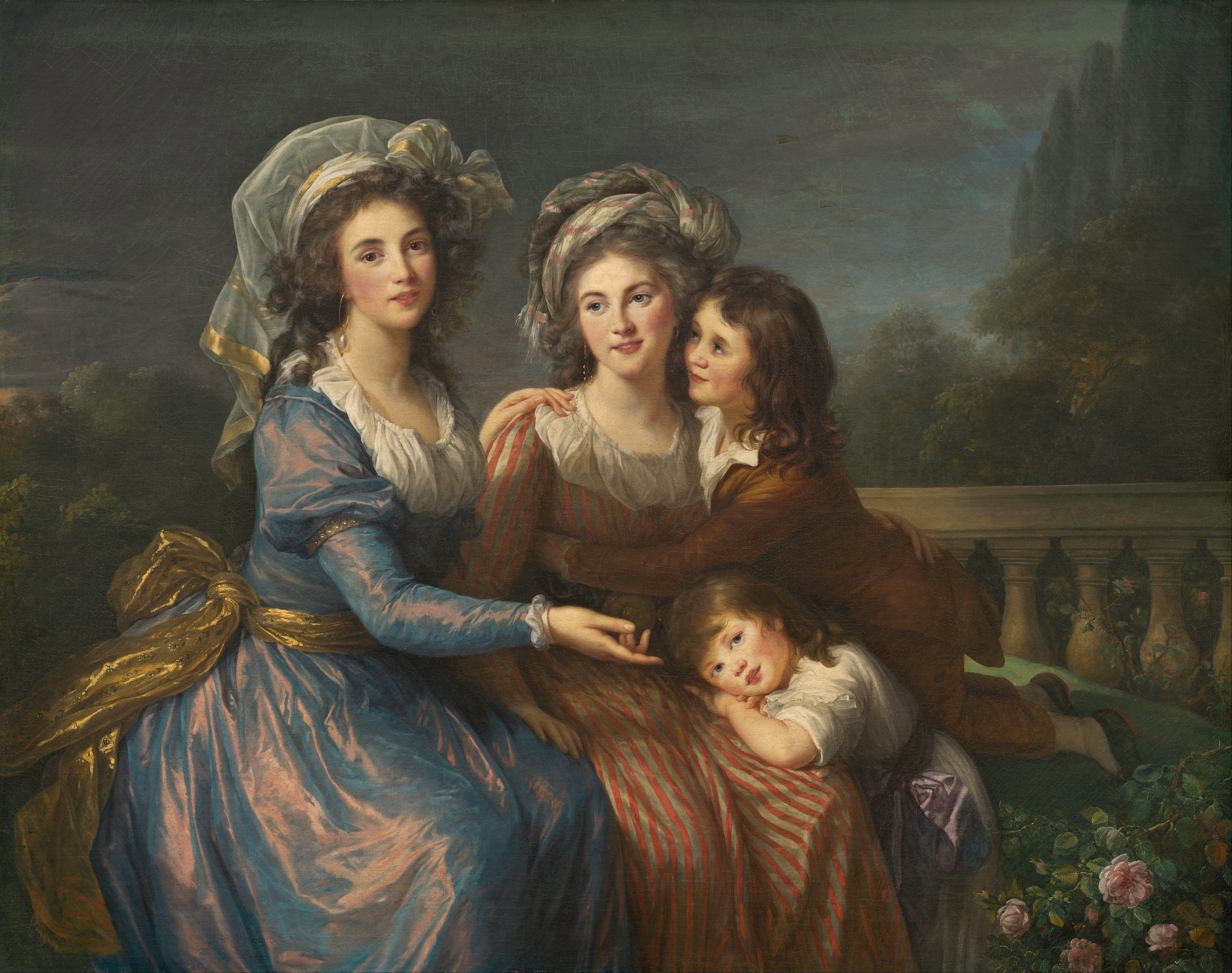
Portrait of marquess de Pezay, née Caroline de Murat, and marquess de Rougé with her two children (Vigée-Lebrun).

== Works ==
- 1768: Zélis au bain, Paris, 1763, 1766, in-8. This poem, in four books, was written with enough natural but in a too free tone; the author, who worked ceaselessly his works, reworked it, changed the outcome and added two songs (la Nouvelle Zélis au bain, Geneva, in-8).
- 1764: Le Pot-pourri, épître à qui on voudra, Paris, Sébastien Jorry.
- 1764: Lettre d'Alcibiade à Glicère, Paris, Sébastien Jorry, in-12.
- 1767: Lettre d'Ovide à Julie, in-8.
- 1767: Suite des Bagatelles anonymes (by Dorat), Paris, in-8.
- 1770: La Closière ou le Vin nouveau, opéra comique, Paris, in-8.
- 1771: Éloge de Fénelon, Paris, in-8.
- 1771: Les Soirées helvétiennes, alsaciennes et franc-comtoises, Paris, in-8; London, 1772, 2 vol. in-12.
- 1771: Les Tableaux, followed by Histoire de Mlle de Syanne et du comte de Marcy, Paris, in-8;
- 1771: Traduction en prose de Catullus, Tibullus and Gallus, Paris, 1771, 1794, 2 vol. in-8 et in-12.
- 1773: La Rosière de Salenci, opéra lyrique, Paris, in-8. The music by Grétry made the success of this work.
- 1775: Histoire des campagnes de Maillebois en Italie en 1745 et 1746, Paris, 3 vol. in-4 and atlas.
- 1775: Journal militaire ou relation détaillée des campagnes de M. le maréchal de Maillebois en Italie: précédé et suivi d'un précis historique de cette guerre.

A selection of his Œuvres was published (Liège, 1791, 2 vol. in-12), preceded by a historical and literary note. Masson de Pezay also contributed articles to the Encyclopédie by Diderot and D'Alembert.

== Bibliography ==
- Ferdinand Hoefer, Nouvelle Biographie générale, t. 39, Paris, Firmin-Didot, 1862, p. 790-1.
- André Grétry, "Notice sur Pezay", in La rosière de Salenci, pastorale en trois actes.
- Jean-Nicolas Dufort de Cheverny, Mémoires sur les règnes de Louis XV et Louis XVI et sur la Révolution, Paris, Plon, Nourrit et Cie, 1886.
- Mémoires de Louis XVIII recueillis et mis en ordre par M. le duc de D****, 1832-1833, (2 t.).
- Mémoires du duc de Lauzun et du comte de Tilly, 1862.
- Saint-Albin Berville, François Barrière, Collection des mémoires relatifs à la révolution française, 1827.
- Pierre-Marie-Michel Lepeintre-Desroches, Suite du Répertoire du Théâtre Français: avec un choix des pièces de plusieurs autres théâtres, vol. 30, 1823.
- Rodolphe Reuss, Le Marquis de Pezay: un touriste parisien en Alsace au XVIIIe, 1876.
- Michaud, Biographie universelle ancienne et moderne ou Histoire, par ordre alphabétique, de la vie publique et privée de tous les hommes qui se sont fait remarquer par leurs écrits, leurs actions, leurs talents, leurs vertus ou leurs crimes: PARM-PF, 1823.
