= Charles Harny de Guerville =

French playwright

Charles Harny de Guerville (24 November 1729 – 7 February 1796) was an 18th-century French playwright.

Apart from his own works, Harny contributed to two plays by Justine Favart (Les amours de Bastien et Bastienne, parodie du Devin de village (1753), and Les ensorcelés, ou Jeannot et Jeannette, parodie des Surprises de l’amour (1757)), and retouched one by Lesage.

== Works ==
- Candidamentor, ou le voyageur grec, Paris, 1766, in-12.
- Georget et Georgette, opéra comique in one act and in prose, mingled with ariettes, Paris, Duchesne, 1761, in-8°.
- Le petit-maître en province, comedy in one act and in free verse with ariettes. Paris, Vve Duchesne, 1765; another edition, Paris, N. B. Duchesne, 1772, in-8°.
- Le prix des talents, one-act parody of the third act of Fêtes de l’hymen et de l’amour by Jean-Philippe Rameau, all in vaudevilles, with M. S***, Paris, Duchesne, 1755, in-8°. (with Sabine)
- La sybille, one-act parody, all in ariettes and vaudevilles, Paris, Delormel, 1758, in-8°. Music by Paul-César Gibert.

== Sources ==
- Quérard, Joseph-Marie (1830). La France littéraire;ou Dictionnaire bibliographique des savants, historiens et gens de lettres de la France, ainsi que des littérateurs étrangers qui ont écrit en français, plus particulièrement pendant les XVIIIe-XIXe (in French). Vol. 24. Paris: Firmin Didot. p. 646.
