= Charles Magnin =

French author (1793–1862)

Charles Magnin (French pronunciation: [ʃaʁl maɲɛ̃]; 1793 - 1862) was a French writer.

== Biography ==
He received a brilliant education, and in 1813 became assistant in the imperial library, and in 1832 one of the directors of that institution. His theatrical criticisms in Le Globe (1826–1830), his lectures at the Sorbonne (1834–1835) on the origin of the modern stage, and his various writings won for him the praise of Sainte-Beuve, and a seat in the Académie des Inscriptions et Belles-Lettres. Magnin also wrote poetry and plays.

== Works ==
His principal works are:

- Origines du théâtre moderne (1838)
- Causeries et méditations (2 vols., 1843)
- Théâtre de Hroswitha (1845, with text and translation)
- Histoire des marionettes (1852).
