= Théâtre de la foire =

Former theatre in Paris, France

Théâtre de la foire (French pronunciation: [teɑtʁ də la fwaʁ]) is the collective name given to the theatre put on at the annual fairs at Saint-Germain and Saint-Laurent (and for a time, at Saint-Ovide) in Paris.

== Foire Saint-Germain ==
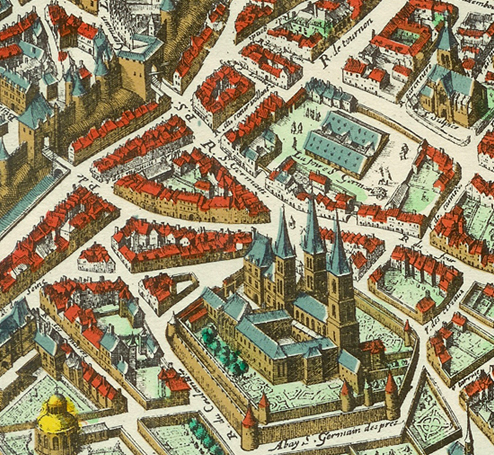
The Abbey of Saint-Germain-des-Prés in 1615 with the Foire Saint-Germain just behind, the Église Saint-Sulpice (upper right) and the old city wall with two gates (upper left) on the Merian plan of Paris

The earliest references to the annual fair date to 1176. The fairground itself was established in 1482 by Louis XI for the benefit of the Abbey of Saint-Germain-des-Prés and was located near the Abbey on the Left Bank southwest of the city center just outside one of the gates of the city wall built by Philip II at the beginning of the 13th century. The covered Saint-Germain market today occupies part of the former fairground site with access from the Boulevard Saint-Germain via the Rue de Montfaucon (satellite view). The fair generally lasted three to five weeks around Easter. During the 18th century it consistently opened on 3 February and lasted until Palm Sunday.

The fair's first actors whose names are recorded were Jehan Courtin and Nicolas Poteau, who so entertained the Parisian public in 1595 that the actors of the Hôtel de Bourgogne filed a suit against them; they probably lost because the two fairground actors returned several years later. In 1618, André Soleil and Isabel Le Gendre met with similar success. Later, marionette manipulators, tightrope walkers and animal trainers so delighted the fair-going public that in 1643, Paul Scarron dedicated a poem on the subject to the Duke of Orléans.

Among the most famous artists of the Saint-Germain fair were: marionette manipulators Jean and François Datelin (better known by the name Brioché), Jean-Baptiste Archambault, Jérôme, Arthur and Nicolas Féron; dancers Charles and Pierre Alard, Moritz von der Beek (aka Maurice), Alexandre Bertrand and Louis Nivelon; actors Louis Gauthier de Saint-Edme, Jean-Baptiste Constantini, Catherine von der Beek, Étienne Baron, Charles Dolet, Antoine Francassani, Jean-Baptiste Hamoche, Dominique Biancolelli, Francisque, and many others for whom Alain-René Lesage, Louis Fuzelier and Jacques-Philippe d'Orneval wrote numerous plays.

Early operatic works by Pierre-Alexandre Monsigny were performed at the fair: the intermède Les aveux indiscrets (7 February 1759), and the opéras bouffons Le maître en droit (13 February 1760), and Le cadi dupé (4 February 1761). François-André Danican Philidor's opéra comique Blaise le savetier was produced there on 9 March 1759, followed by Le jardinier et son seigneur on 18 February 1761.

Among depictions of this fair is the famous miniature dated 1763 by Louis-Nicolas van Blarenberghe (1716–1794) at the Wallace Collection in London.

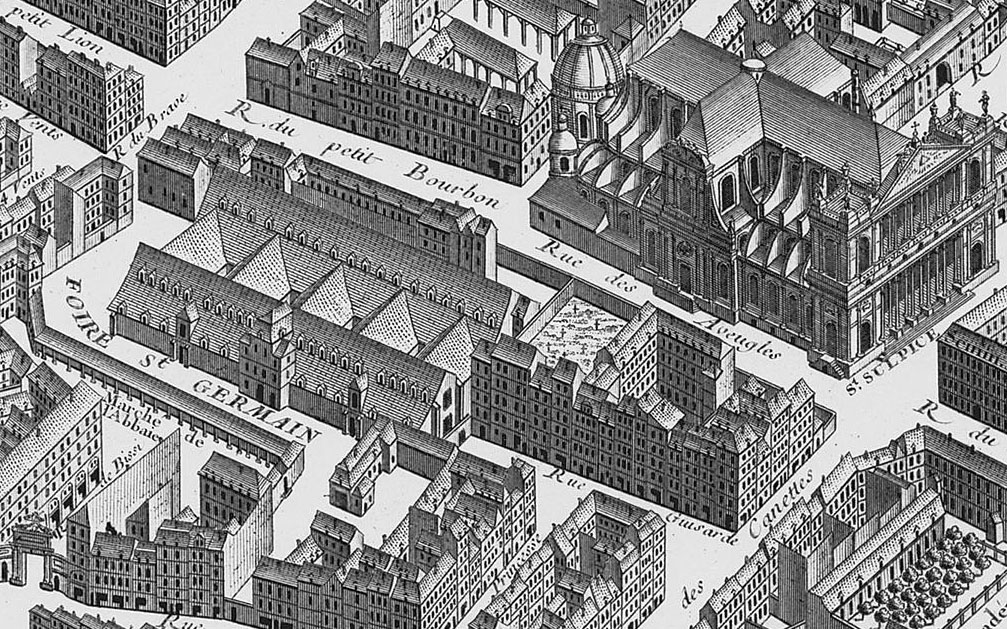
The Foire Saint-Germain as shown in Turgot's 1739 map of Paris with the Église Saint-Sulpice (upper right)

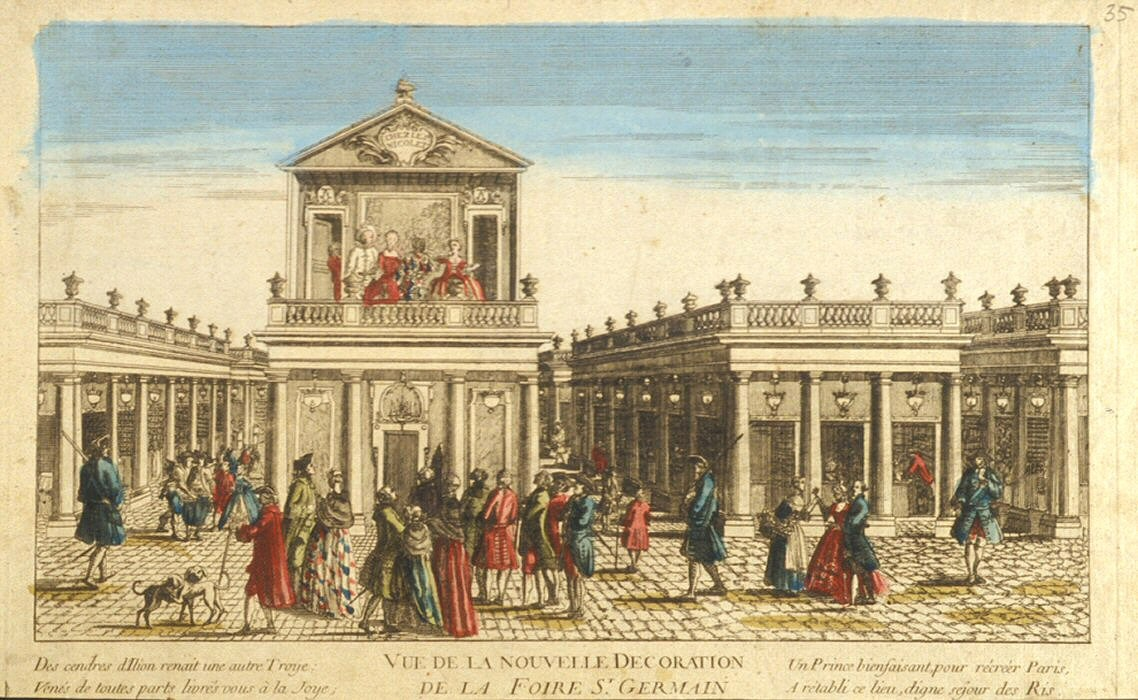
The Foire Saint-Germain after its reconstruction in 1763. A parade, a short comic entertainment to entice passersby to buy tickets, is being performed on the balcony of Nicolet's theatre.

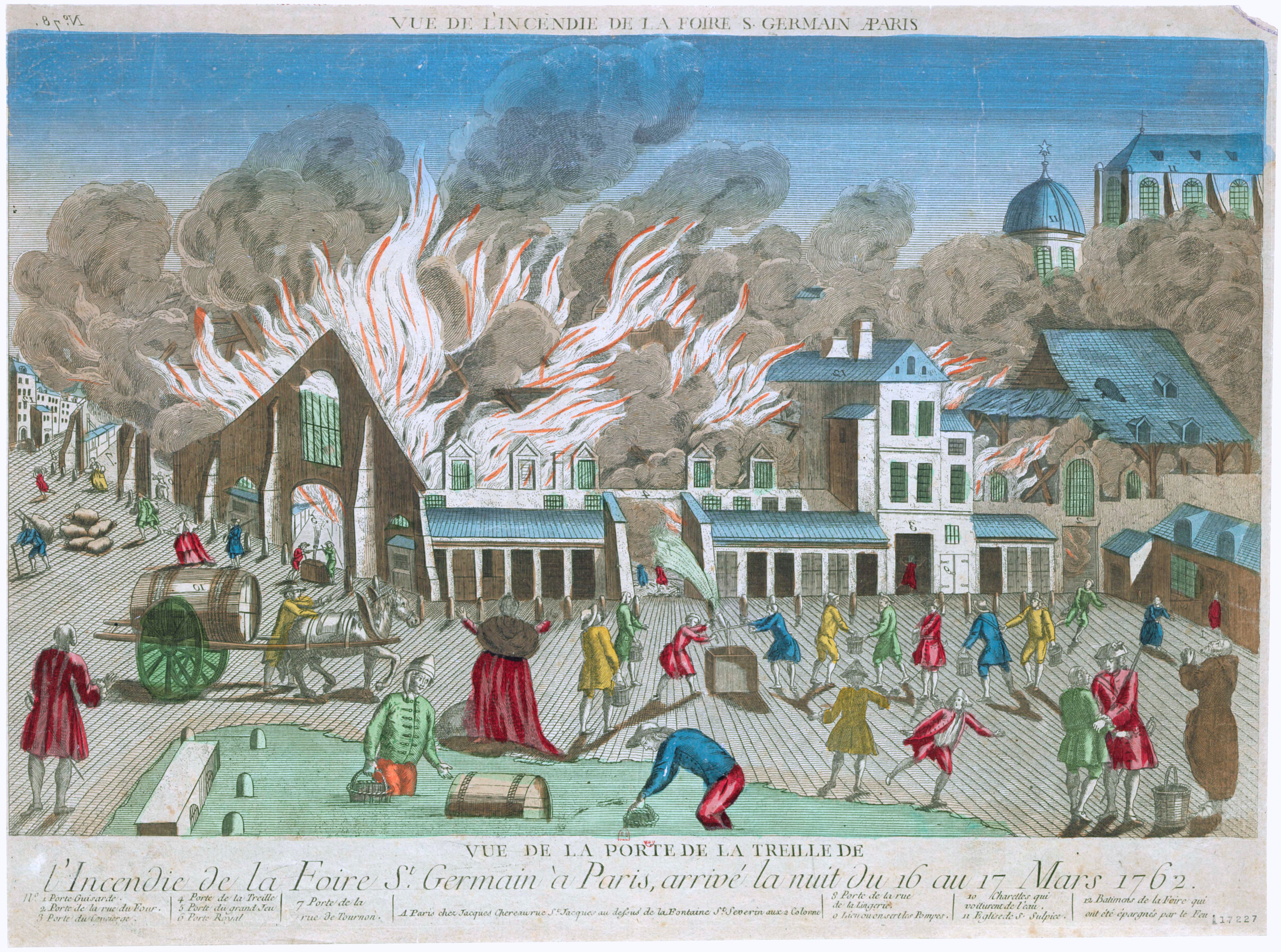
A fire which destroyed the Foire Saint-Germain on the night of 16/17 March 1762

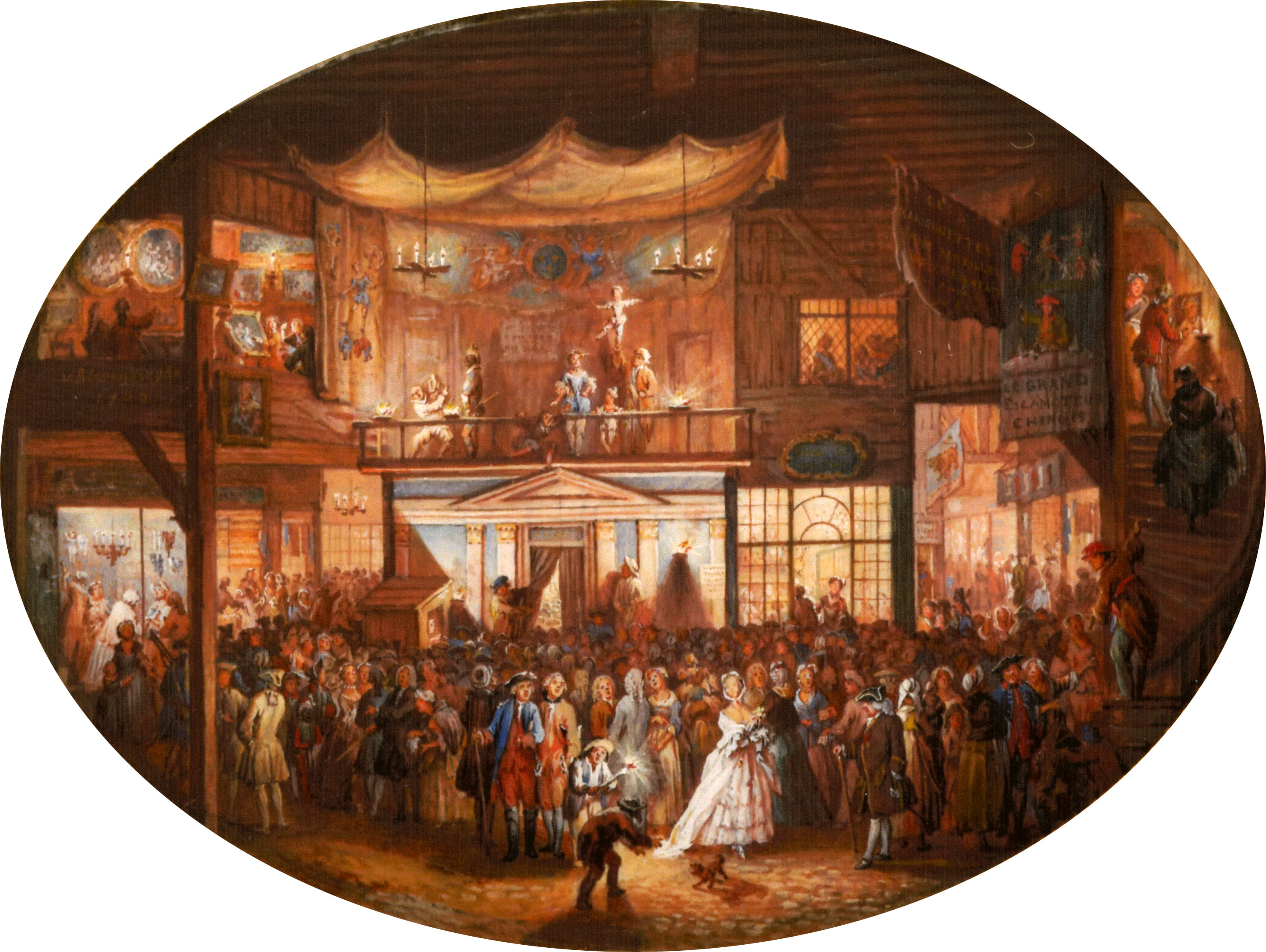
Foire Saint-Germain in 1763, miniature by Blarenberghe

== Foire Saint-Laurent ==
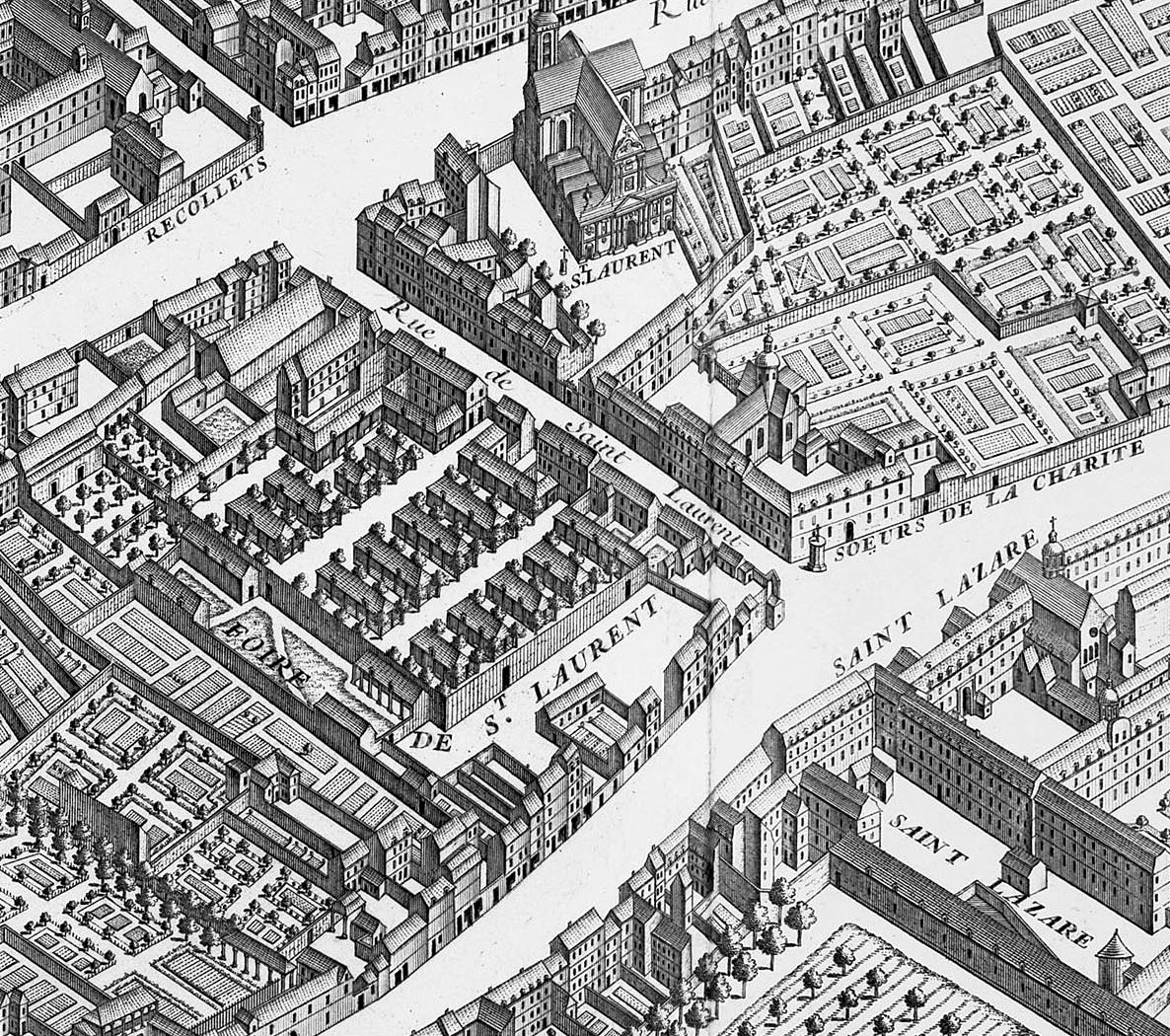
The Foire Saint-Laurent as depicted in Turgot's 1739 map of Paris (detail from plate 13)

The Saint Laurent fair was first established in 1183 in central Paris at Les Champeaux (later better known as Les Halles). After a century and a half, it moved north of Paris to a site near the fair's new sponsor, the leper colony of Saint-Lazare. In 1661 it moved to a nearby enclosure on the north side of the Rue de Saint Laurent, across from and a bit west of the Church of Saint-Laurent. The new location was just east of the Rue du Faubourg Saint-Denis, across from the Abbaye des frères de Saint-Lazare (as the leper colony was now known). The Abbaye was later to become the Prison Saint-Lazare, and finally the Hôpital Saint-Lazare. Although the fairground was demolished in the early 19th century, its former site is located directly southwest of the entrance to today's Gare de l'Est.

The Saint-Laurent fair was a meeting place for artisans, merchants, and the middle class, and was held outdoors, while the Saint-Germain fair, sheltered from the weather, served as more of a showcase for luxury commodities (jewelry, china, musical instruments, prints). Many artists and performance troupes from the Saint-Germain fair also appeared at Saint-Laurent, as one fair happened in the spring and the other took place in the summer. Beginning in the eighteenth century, the Saint-Laurent Fair was scheduled to last from 9 August to 29 September. The alternation in the timing of the fairs allowed the public to follow their favorite shows and permitted the evolution of a kind of theatrical "soap opera", where a play which began at Saint-Germain was continued at Saint-Laurent.

A number of celebrated opéras comiques by François-André Danican Philidor were first performed at the fair: Le diable à quatre, ou La double métamorphose (19 August 1756), L'huître et les plaideurs, ou Le tribunal de la chicane (17 September 1759), Le soldat magicien (14 August 1760), and Le maréchal ferrant (22 August 1761). Pierre-Alexandre Monsigny's On ne s'avise jamais de tout was premiered there on 14 September 1761.

== Foire Saint-Ovide ==
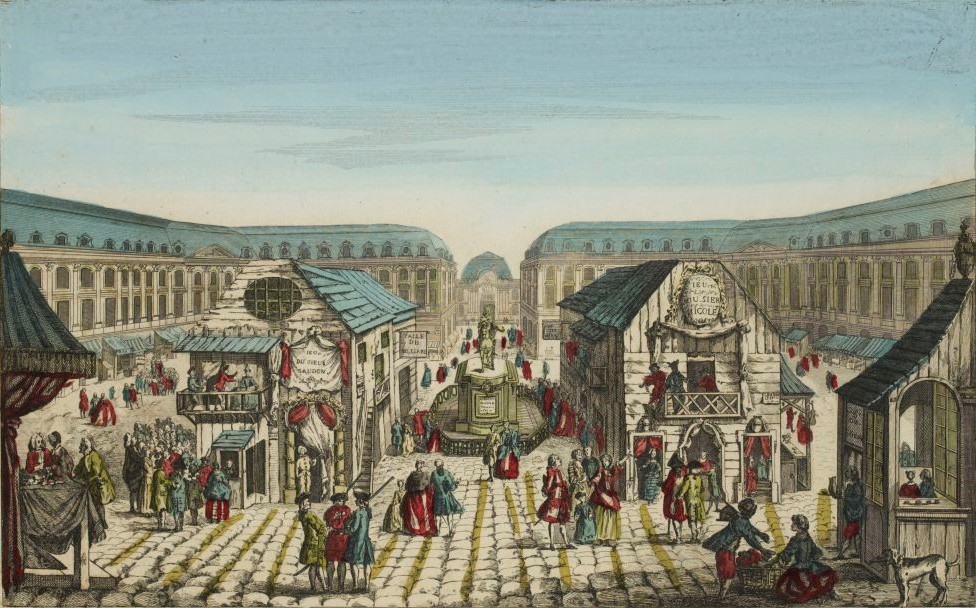
Foire Saint-Ovide around 1770 by Jacques-Gabriel Huquier, (musée de la Révolution française).

Founded in 1764 at the Place Louis XIV (now known as Place Vendôme), the Saint-Ovide fair moved to the Place Louis XV (now called the Place de la Concorde) in 1772.

A small fair, it nonetheless competed with the Saint-Laurent fair, taking place at roughly the same time of year (approximately August 15 to September 15). It disappeared in 1777, destroyed by a fire.

== Co-existence with the "grands théâtres" ==
From marionettes and tightrope walkers, fairground performers gradually came to perform extremely small plays, often written by renowned and talented authors. After the expulsion of Italian actors in 1697, actors and showmen were emboldened and they appropriated the Italians' repertoire. The professionalization of entertainment at the fair began to worry the Comédie-Française, which saw in it a dangerous competition. The Comédie-Française tried every means to preserve its privileges and, after many trials conducted before the Châtelet and the Parlement of Paris, it achieved the outright prohibition of performances with dialogue.

But it had not counted on the tricks that fairground actors were able to deploy to subvert these prohibitions. Seeing themselves prohibited from using any dialogue onstage, the actors began in 1707 to only play their parts in the form of monologues, or to talk to a mute, to an interlocutor placed in the wings, or even to an animal. Later they invented a form of jargon evoking a sort of low Latin, but which did not compete with the French language of which the Comédie-Française claimed exclusive use. Later, performers would write all the dialogue on "écriteaux" (signs), a sort of paper roll on which they displayed the words of the play. Here is how Ménier, the Commissioner of Police in Paris, described the scene in 1718:

"Next appear three archers who want to stop Harlequin, who, playing his lyre, charms them and manages to escape, all of which comprises the first act, which is performed by the actors as well as by the audience with the help of signs descending from above, on which are written the stories that make up the play: the actors gesture and express through various pantomime motions what is written on the signs, and the spectators sing and in some places the actors, to link the verses, say a few words, and when the signs come down, four violins, a bass, and an oboe sound the theme of the story written on the signs which the public sings."

The Comédie-Française no longer had any objective reasons for working against the fair performers; their claims had been met. It was now the turn of the Académie Royale de Musique to tell the competition that it was the unique holder of the right to sing, dance and accompany plays with music in France. The balance of power played out differently here and soon, the directors of the opera, plagued by increasing financial crises, tried to save the day by selling two fair directors the right to produce sung performances. Thus the Opéra-Comique was born in 1714.

Given the growing success of the fair performances, the opera demanded increasingly exorbitant royalties, which put a strain on fair directors. The strategic ally of the Opera, the Comédie-Française took the opportunity to deal a fatal blow in 1719: it obtained the removal of all fair shows, with the exception of marionnettes and tightrope walking.

Meanwhile, the regent had restored the Comédie-Italienne: it took the opportunity to occupy the St. Laurent fair for three years, from 1721 to 1723, but it did not meet with the expected success.

In 1724, a candle merchant named Maurice Honoré obtained permission to restore the Opéra-Comique and managed the company for three years. He was replaced by Pontau, Devienne, Jean Monnet and Charles Simon Favart, who directed the company successively until 1762, when it was reunited with the Comédie-Italienne.

A variety of fairground attractions appeared alongside performances by the Opéra-Comique: dancers, puppeteers and tightrope artists performed next to giants, dwarfs, monsters, talking heads, performing animals, etc. Gradually, the shows were moved to the boulevards, mostly to the Boulevard du Temple which in the 19th century was nicknamed the Boulevard du Crime. It was also at the fairs and on the boulevards that Jean-Baptiste Nicolet's troupe, the Grands-Danseurs du Roi, was born.
