= Justine Favart =

French opera singer (1727–1772)

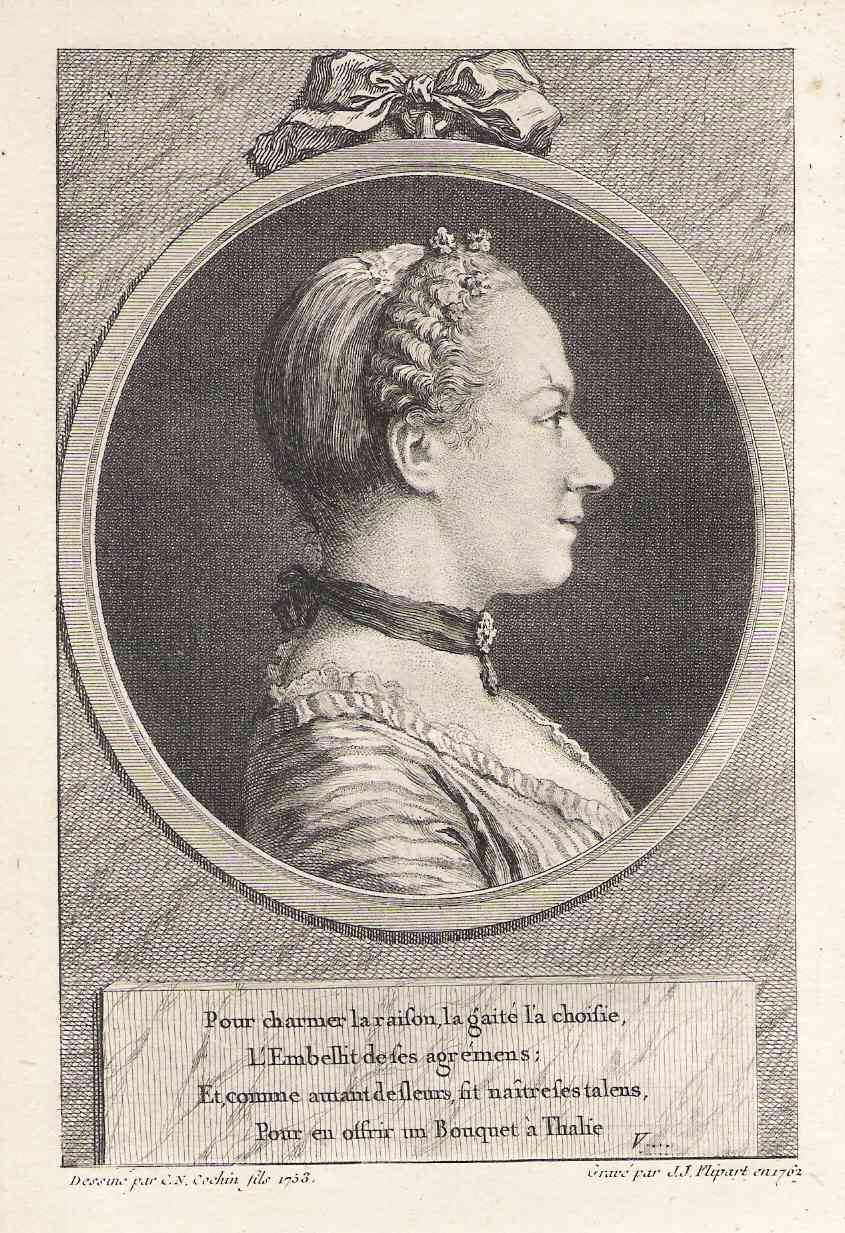
- Madame Favart (1762) in an engraving by Flipart after a portrait by Charles-Nicolas Cochin
- Born: Marie Duronceray; 15 June 1727; Avignon, France
- Died: 22 April 1772 (aged 44); Paris, France
- Occupations: Actress; Operatic singer Playwright
- Spouse: Charles Simon Favart

Marie Justine Benoîte Favart (née Duronceray) (French pronunciation: [maʁi ʒystin bənwat favaʁ]; 15 June 1727 – 22 April 1772) was an operatic singer, actress, playwright and dancer, the wife of the dramatist, Charles Simon Favart.

== Biography ==
Madame Favart is largely responsible for the 18th-century change in Parisian operatic taste from French standards to performances of a lyric type adapted from Italian models, which developed later into the genuine French comic opera. She was also a bold reformer in matters of stage costume, playing the peasant with bare arms, in wooden shoes and linen dress, and not, as heretofore, in court costume with enormous hoops, diamonds and long white kid gloves. With her husband, and other authors, she collaborated in a number of successful pieces, and one La fille mal gardée she produced alone.

Maurice, comte de Saxe, a Marshal of France and her husband's patron, began to make advances to Mme Favart, and Favart was forced to flee. Mme Favart was established by the marshal in a house at Vaugirard; proving a fickle mistress, she was suddenly arrested and confined in a convent, where she was brought to unconditional surrender in the beginning of 1750. Before the year was out the marshal died, and Mme Favart reappeared at the Comédie Italienne, where for twenty years she was a great favourite. Among the roles created by Mme Favart were La Vieille, Robinette and Thérèse in Egidio Duni's La fée Urgèle, which was premiered at court in 1765.

Madame Favart in fictionalised form is the title-character of Offenbach's 1878 opéra comique, Madame Favart.

In the edition in ten volumes of the works of the couple Favart, published in 1763–1772 at Duchesne (Paris), Volume 5 is devoted exclusively to the dramatic works of Marie Justine Favart. These are the following:

- 1753: Les amours de Bastien et Bastienne, parodie du Devin de village,
- 1754: La feste d’amour, ou Lucas et Colinette, petite pièce en vers et en un acte,
- 1757: Les encorcelés, ou Jeannot et Jeannette, parodie des Surprises de l’amour,
- 1758: La fille mal gardée, ou Le pédant amoureux, parodie de la Provençale,
- 1760: La fortune au village, parodie d’Églée and
- 1762: Annette et Lubin, comédie en un acte et en vers.

== Sources ==
- Warrack, John and West, Ewan (1992), The Oxford Dictionary of Opera, 782 pages, ISBN 0-19-869164-5
