= Charles Simon Favart =

French playwright and theatre director (1710–1792)

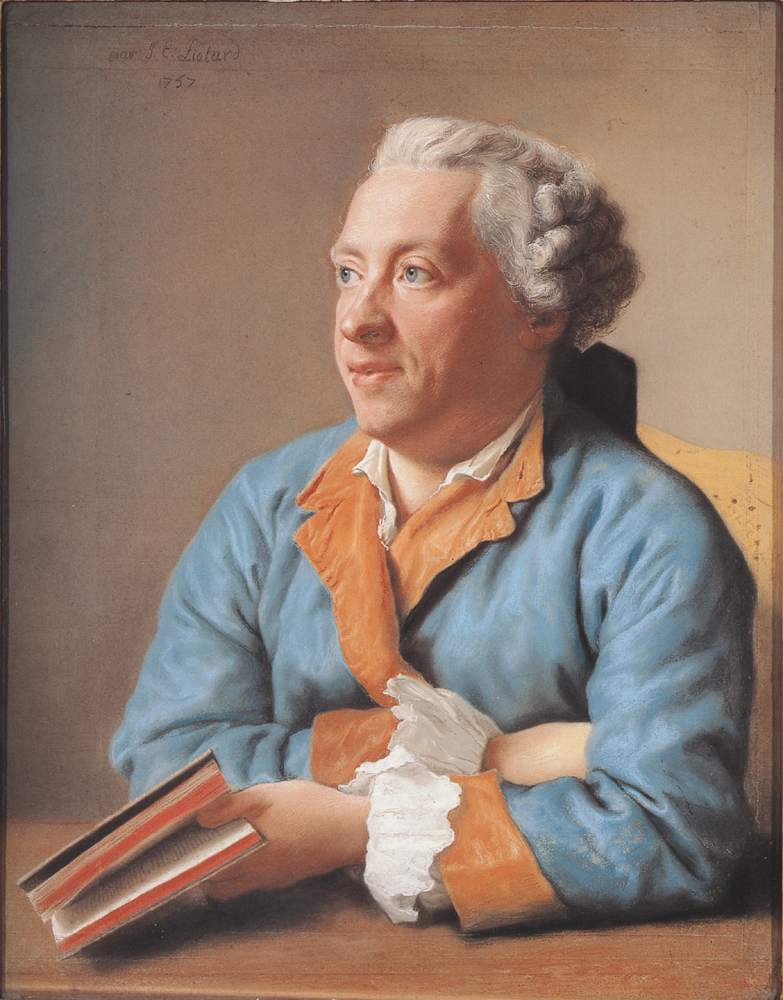
Charles-Simon Favart, 1757, pastel portrait by Jean-Étienne Liotard

Charles Simon Favart (French pronunciation: [ʃaʁl simɔ̃ favaʁ]; 13 November 1710 – 12 May 1792) was a French playwright and theatre director. The Salle Favart in Paris is named after him.

== Biography ==
Born in Paris, the son of a pastry-cook, he was educated at the Lycée Louis-le-Grand, and after his father's death he carried on the business for a time. His first success in literature was La France delivrée par la Pucelle d'Orléans, a poem about Joan of Arc which obtained a prize of the Académie des Jeux Floraux. After the production of his first vaudeville, Les Deux Jumelles (1734), circumstances enabled him to relinquish business and devote himself entirely to the drama. He provided many pieces anonymously for the lesser theatres, and first put his name to La Chercheuse d'esprit, which was produced in 1741.

Among his most successful works were Annette et Lubin; Le Coq du milage (1743); Les Vendanges de Tempé (1745), later reworked as La Vallée de Montmorency (1752); Ninette à la cour (1753); Les Trois Sultanes (1761) and L'Anglais de Bordeaux (1763). Favart became director of the Opéra-Comique, and in 1745 married Marie Justine Benoîte Duronceray, a beautiful young dancer, singer and actress, who as "Mlle Chantilly" had made a successful début the year before. By their united talents and labours, the Opéra-Comique rose to such a height of success that it aroused the jealousy of the rival Comédie-Française and was suppressed.

Favart, left thus without resources, accepted the proposal of comte Maurice de Saxe, and became director of a troupe of comedians which was to accompany Maurice's army into Flanders. It was part of his duty to compose from time to time impromptu verses on the events of the campaign, amusing and stimulating the spirits of the men. So popular were Favart and his troupe that the enemy became desirous of hearing his company and sharing his services, and permission was given to gratify them, battles and comedies thus curiously alternating with each other.

Saxe, an admirer of Mme Favart, began to pay her unwanted attentions. To escape him she went to Paris, and the wrath of Saxe fell upon the husband. A lettre de cachet was issued against him, but he fled to Strasbourg and found concealment in a cellar.

Favart survived his wife by twenty years. After the marshal's death in 1750 he returned to Paris and resumed his pursuits as a dramatist. It was at this time that he became friendly with the abbé de Voisenon, who helped him with his work, to what extent is uncertain. He had grown nearly blind in his last days, and died in Paris. The Favart's second son, Charles Nicolas Favart was also an actor and dramatist.

His plays have been republished in various editions and selections (1763-1772, 12 vols.; 1810, 3 vols.; 1813; 1853). His correspondence (1759-1763) with Count Durazzo, director of theatres at Vienna, was published in 1808 as Mémoires et correspondance littéraire, dramatique et anecdotique de CS Favart. It furnishes valuable information on the state of the literary and theatrical worlds in the 18th century.

Favart's plays are also known to have inspired his close friend, the artist François Boucher, to create numerous paintings featuring Favart's characters of "the little Shepherd" and the shepherdess "Lisette." These include Boucher's The Agreeable Lesson (also known as The Flute Players) of 1748 and An Autumn Pastoral (also known as The Grape Eaters) of 1749. In turn, these paintings inspired artists of the Sèvres Porcelain Manufactory to create a pair of figurines showing the two characters in poses imitating the characters of the play.

== Works ==
Some 60 of the c. 150 plays that he composed (essentially comedies and opéras-comiques) were published in his lifetime, in 10 volumes, under the title Théâtre de M. Favart, Paris, Duchesne (later Veuve Duchesne), 1763–1772. Reprint in fac-simile, Geneva, Slatkine, 1971, 10 t. Availabable on Gallica.

- 1732: Polichinelle comte de Paonfier
- 1734: Les Deux Jumelles
- 1735: La Foire de Bezons
- 1738: Le Bal bourgeois
- 1739: Moulinet premier, parody
- 1740: La Servante justifiée
- 1741: La Chercheuse d'esprit, opéra-comique
- 1741: La Fête de Saint-Cloud
- 1742: Le Prix de Cyhtère, opéra comique
- 1742: Hippolyte et Aricie, parody
- 1743: Le Coq de village, opéra comique
- 1744: Acajou, opéra comique
- 1744: Le Bal de Strasbourg, ballet
- 1745: Les Vendanges de Tempé
- 1747: Les Nymphes de Diane
- 1747: Les Amours grivois
- 1748: Cythère assiégée
- 1750: Zéphire et Fleurette
- 1751: Les Indes dansantes, parody of Indes galantes
- 1753: Raton et Rosette, parody of Titon et l'Aurore
- 1753: Les Amours de Bastien et Bastienne, parody of Devin du village
- 1755: La Servante maîtresse, parody of La serva padrona by Giovanni Battista Pergolesi.
- 1755: Ninette à la cour, opéra comique
- 1761: Les Trois Sultanes ou Soliman Second
- 1762: Annette et Lubin, opéra comique
- 1763: L'Anglais à Bordeaux
- 1765: La Fée Urgèle ou Ce qui plaît aux dames, opéra-comique
- 1769: La Rosière de Salency, opéra comique
- 1773: La Belle Arsène, opéra comique

Favart also left Mémoires, published in 1808 by his grandson.

== Trivia ==
- Favart and his wife appeared in fictionalised form in Offenbach's 1878 opéra comique, Madame Favart
- Favart reworked Rinaldo di Capua's La Zingara as La Bohemienne.
- Favart's Hippolyte et Aricie (1742) is a parody of the opera by Jean-Philippe Rameau bearing the same name.

Preceded by D'Hannetaire	Director of Théâtre royal de la Monnaie; 1746–1748	Succeeded by Jean-Benoît Leclair
