= L'école de la jeunesse =

French opéra comique by Egidio Duni

- Opéra comique by Egidio Duni
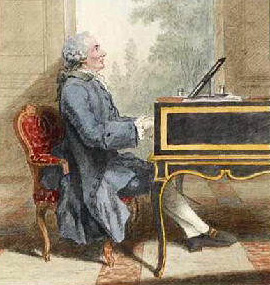
- The composer, by Carmontelle c. 1760
- Translation: The School of Youth
- Librettist: Louis Anseaume
- Language: French
- Based on: Lillo's play The London Merchant
- Premiere: 24 January 1765; Opéra-Comique, Paris

L'école de la jeunesse ou Le Barnevelt françois (The School of Youth or The French Barnwell) is an opéra comique (specifically a comédie mêlée d'ariettes) in three acts by the composer Egidio Duni. The libretto, by Louis Anseaume, is based on George Lillo's play The London Merchant or The History of George Barnwell (1731). The opera was first performed at the Opéra-Comique in Paris on 24 January 1765.

== Main roles ==
Roles, voice types, premiere cast
Cast	Voice type	Premiere cast, 24 January 1765
Cléon	tenor	Jean-François Lejeune
M. Oronte, Cléon's uncle	baritone	Joseph Caillot
Sophie, bethrothed to Cléon	soprano	Marie-Thérèse Laruette, 'Madame Laruette'
Dubois, a valet of M. Oronte	tenor	Jean-Baptiste Dehesse
Hortense, a young widow	soprano	Pétronille-Rosalie Beaupré
Finette, an attendant of Hortense	soprano	Eulalie Desgland(s)
Mondor, a friend of Hortense	haute-contre	Jean-Louis Laruette
Damis	tenor	Robert Desbrosses
Javard, a creditor of Cléon	basse-taille (bass-baritone)	M. Renaud
A Gascon knight	haute-contre	Antoine Trial
A baron	basse-taille (bass-baritone)	not reported
A singer	tenor	M. Lobreau
A milliner	spoken	Rosalie Lafond
A bailiff A pedlar	spoken	Gabiel-Éléonor-Hervé Dubus Champville, 'Soli'
A valet	spoken	not reported
