= Méreaux =

Méreaux is the surname of a number of French composers:

- Nicolas-Jean Lefroid de Méreaux (1745-1797), an opera composer
- Joseph-Nicolas Lefroid de Méreaux (1767-1838), his son, a composer for the piano
- Amédée Méreaux (1802-1874), son of Joseph-Nicolas Lefroid de Méreaux, a musicologist, pianist and composer
- Max Méreaux (born 1946), a composer and music teacher
