= Canente =

Canente is the title of two French operas:

- Canente (Collasse) (1700) by Pascal Collasse
- Canente (Dauvergne) (1760) by Antoine Dauvergne
