= Pierre-Louis Moline =

French dramatist, poet and librettist

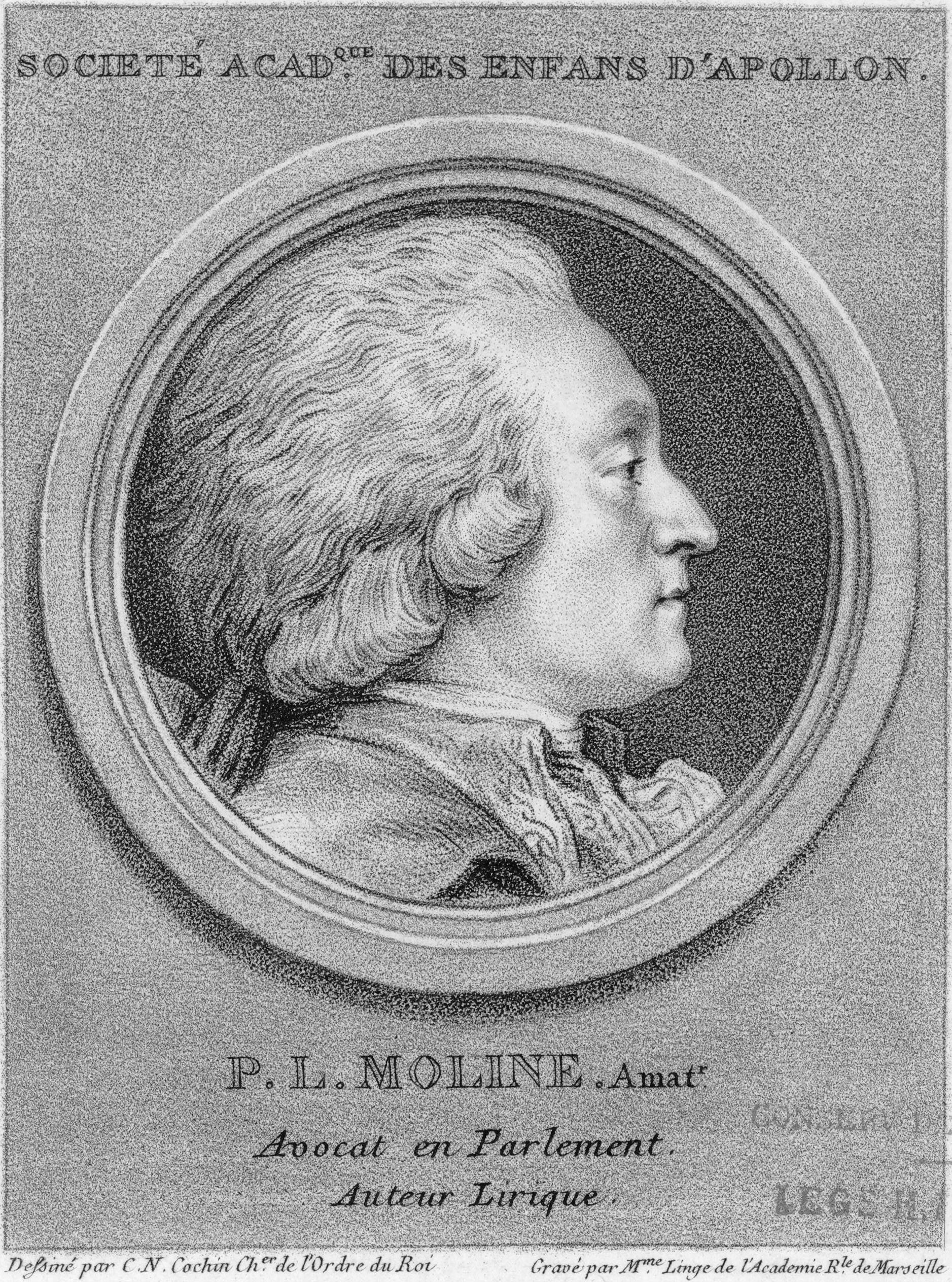
Pierre-Louis Moline, 1780

Pierre-Louis Moline (27 May 1739 – 20 March 1820) was a prolific French dramatist, poet and librettist. His play La Réunion du six août was one of the longest-running patriotic pieces during the time of the French Revolution with 52 performances at the Paris Opéra. He also wrote the epitaph for the tomb of Jean-Paul Marat. However, he is best remembered today for having adapted Calzabigi's libretto for Gluck's Orphée et Euridice (a reworked version of his Orfeo ed Euridice).

== Biography ==
Moline was born in Montpellier and studied art at the University of Avignon. He then went to Paris, where he studied law. He was accepted as a lawyer to the French parliament, but devoted most of his time to literary pursuits. Two of his librettos for the Paris Opera were highly successful: his adaptation of Calzabigi for Gluck's Orphée et Euridice (1774) and Jean-Frédéric Edelmann's Ariane dans l'isle de Naxos (1782). Moline also collaborated with Gluck on his 1775 revision of L'arbre enchanté, a one-act opéra comique, which had premiered in Vienna at the Schönbrunn Palace in 1759.

During the French Revolution he served as a secretary-clerk to the National Convention and wrote several patriotic theatrical pieces, including his most famous work of this type, La Réunion du six août. Moline died in Paris, leaving no known heirs.

Julian Rushton, writing in The New Grove Dictionary of Opera, says of Moline: "With deplorable fecundity, he contributed to every fashionable stage genre, including tragedy, comedy of manners, bourgeois drama and Revolutionary sans-culottide."

== Works ==
=== Libretti ===
- Orphée et Eurydice – opera set by Gluck, 1774
- L'arbre enchanté – revised version of 1775, adapted from the original libretto set by Gluck in 1759
- Cythère assiégée – (with Favart) opera set by Gluck, 1775
- Roger Bontems et Javotte – (with Louis Archambault Dorvigny) comédie mêlée d'ariettes (parody of Orphée et Eurydice), 1775
- La Résurrection – oratorio set by Méreaux, 1780
- Jephthe – oratorio set by Vogel, 1781
- L'arche d'alliance davant Jérusalem – oratorio set by Gossec, 1781
- La morte d'Absalon – oratorio set by Joseph Lenoble 1782
- Les fureurs de Saül – oratorio set by Giroust, 1786
- Le triomphe d'Alcide à Athènes : drame héroïque en deux actes, mêlé de chants et de danses – set by Francesco Bianchi, given at Théâtre Molière, September 1806

=== Plays ===
- Thémistocle – tragedy in five acts, 1766
- La Réunion du six août, ou l'Inauguration de la République française – (with Gabriel Bouquier), mêlée de déclamations in five acts, 1794
- Le premier navigateur – comedy in three acts, published 1807
- L'amour anglais – comedy in three acts, 1788
