= Méreau (disambiguation) =

Méreau is a commune in France.

Méreau may also refer to:

- Méreau (token), used in France during the Late Middle Ages and Reformation

== People with the surname ==
- Sophie Mereau (1770–1806), German writer

== See also ==
- Méreaux (disambiguation)
