= Les troqueurs =

Opera by Antoine Dauvergne

Les troqueurs (The Barterers) is a comic opera in one act by the French composer Antoine Dauvergne, first performed at the Foire Saint-Laurent in Paris on 30 July 1753 and revived by the Opéra-Comique at the Hôtel de Bourgogne on 26 February 1762. The libretto, by Jean-Joseph Vadé, is based on the tale in verse of the same name by La Fontaine.

Although designated an opéra bouffon or an intermède, Les troqueurs is famous as an important work in the development of opéra comique. Since 1752, musical life in Paris had been wracked by the so-called Querelle des Bouffons, an argument between the rival partisans of French and Italian music. The Italian faction was particularly keen on comic opera (opera buffa), best represented in their eyes by Pergolesi's La serva padrona. Jean Monnet, head of the Théâtre de la Foire Saint-Laurent, decided to commission Dauvergne to write a new French opera in the style of Pergolesi. The result was Les troqueurs and it was an immediate success. In his memoirs, Monnet claims he tricked the Italian faction, who were likely to reject anything by a French composer out of hand, by spreading the rumour that the opera was the work of an Italian living in Vienna who had a good knowledge of the French language. The Italian partisans were fooled and warmly welcomed Les troqueurs, although when Monnet subsequently revealed the deception they were furious.

Les troqueurs, with its simple plot, everyday characters and Italianate melodies, had a great influence on the relatively new genre of French opéra comique. Up to that point, opéras comiques had been spoken plays with songs whose words were new but whose music was not original. Dauvergne set the fashion for composing the music to these pieces afresh. Unlike opéras comiques, however, Les troqueurs utilizes sung (recitatives) rather than spoken dialogue. In this, Dauvergne was following the example of Pergolesi's La serva padrona.

== Roles ==
Cast	Voice type	Premiere:
Lubin	bass	
Lucas	bass	
Fanchon	soprano	
Margot	soprano	Marie-Jeanne Fesch

== Synopsis ==
Lubin is engaged to Margot, but he finds her a bit too flighty. His friend, Lucas, is engaged to Fanchon, but he finds her a bit too laid-back and languorous.

The two men decide to swap partners, and inform their fiancées what they have decided. Outraged, Margot swears vengeance and after a whispered conversation the two women give their consent.

Lucas tells Margot that he wants to make her happy, but when she replies that she loves spending money, abundance, games and dancing, he begins to regret his new choice. Lubin, too, has discovered that you can have too much of a good thing, and finds Fanchon's slowness an irritation.

The men ask to be taken back by their former partners, but the women refuse until the men, on their knees, beg for pardon. Only when Lucas agrees to obey Fanchon in all things, and Lubin agrees that Margot will be the mistress of their household, do the women relent.

== Recording ==
- Les troqueurs Mary Saint-Palais, Sophie Marin-Degor, Nicolas Rivenq, Jean-Marc Salzmann, Cappella Coloniensis, conducted by William Christie (Harmonia Mundi, 1994)

== Sources ==
- Booklet notes to the Christie recording
- Le magazine de l'opéra baroque (in French)
- Libretto, at livretsbaroques.fr
- Dauvergne, Antoine. Les troqueurs, en un acte, facsimile libretto in French. (Duchesne, Paris, 1772). View at Google Books.
- The Viking Opera Guide ed. Holden (Viking, 1993)
