= L'arbre enchanté =

Opera by Christoph Willibald Gluck

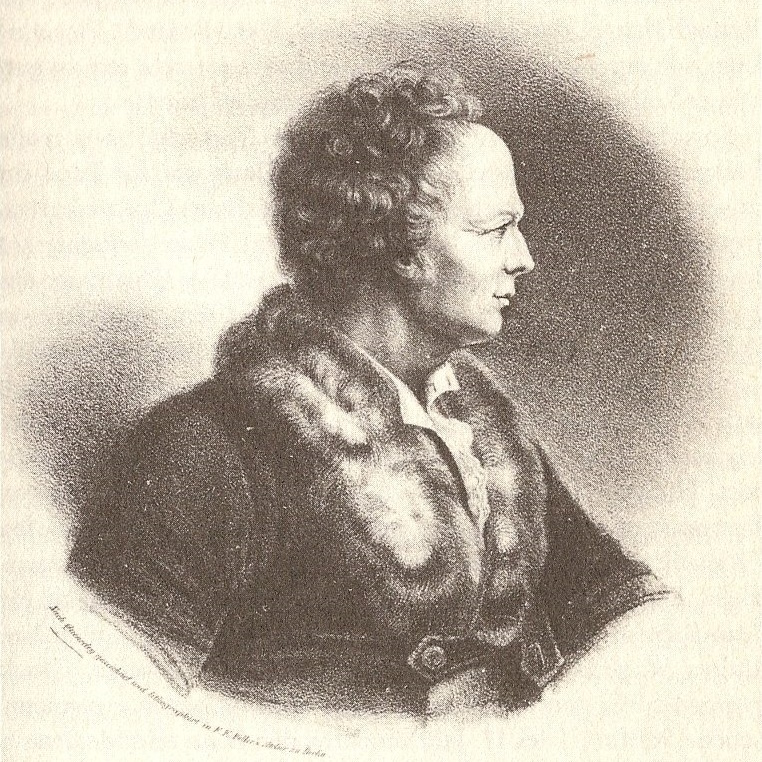
Portrait of Christoph Willibald Gluck, ca. 1750

L'arbre enchanté, ou Le tuteur dupé (The Magic Tree, or, the Tutor Duped), Wq 42, is a one-act opéra comique by Christoph Willibald Gluck to a libretto based on the 1752 opéra-comique Le poirier ("The Peartree") with a text by Jean-Joseph Vadé. Vadé's libretto was based on a tale from Boccaccio's Decameron, as retold by Jean de La Fontaine. Gluck's opera was written for the name day of Emperor Francis I, premiering at the Schönbrunn Palace in Vienna on the evening of 3 October 1759, the anniversary of the death of Saint Francis of Assisi.

Gluck revised the work to a versified adaptation by Pierre-Louis Moline of the original libretto, to which was also added (for Lubin) the ariette "Près de l'objet qui m'inflamme", parodied from Gluck's earlier opera Le cadi dupé. The revised version was first performed on 27 February 1775 as L'arbre enchanté, at the Palace of Versailles.

The story is slightly varied in Chaucer's tale of May and Januarie ("The Merchant's Tale"), where it is instead the pair of lovers who climb the tree.

The diarist Karl von Zinzendorf related that Gluck sang the part of an ailing singer from the wings in 1761.

== Roles ==
Role	Voice type	Premiere cast, 3 October 1759
Claudine a young woman	soprano	
Lucette, her sister	soprano	
Lubin, aka Pierot, Lucette's suitor	haute-contre	
Blaise, a fisherman	tenor	
Thomas, Lucette's tutor	bass	
M. Debonsecours	bass	
