= Étienne Morel de Chédeville =

French playwright and librettist

Étienne Morel de Chédeville (10 October 1751 in Paris - 13 July 1814 in Villeneuve-Saint-Georges) was an 18th-century French playwright and librettist.

He wrote the librettos for the following operas:

- 1783 : La caravane du Caire by André Grétry
- 1783 : Alexandre aux Indes by Nicolas-Jean Lefroid de Méreaux
- 1785 : Thémistocle by François-André Danican Philidor
- 1785 : Panurge dans l'île des lanternes by André Grétry
- 1786 : Tamerlan by Johann Friedrich Reichardt
- 1789 : Aspasie by André Grétry
