= Marianna Bianchi =

Italian soprano

- Born: c. 1735
- Occupation: Opera singer
- Spouse(s): Antonio Tozzi

Marianna Bianchi Tozzi (c. 1735 – after 1790) was an Italian soprano best known for creating the role of Eurydice in Christoph Willibald Gluck's opera Orfeo ed Euridice (1762).

Marianna Bianchi was born around 1735, possibly in Venice. Her opera seria début was in Parma in 1753. She became prima donna in Venice in 1762. In October 1762, she performed at the premiere of Orfeo ed Euridice at the Burgtheater. Later that month, she performed at the Palais Collalto along with a six-year-old Wolfgang Amadeus Mozart and his sister playing the harpsichord.

She performed with her husband, composer Antonio Tozzi, in Brunswick (1765–1768), where she appeared in his Andromaca (1765), and in Munich (1773-1775), where she appeared in his Zenobia (1773). Tozzi was forced to return to Italy in 1775 after he had a liaison with the Countess von Törring-Seefeld.

Bianchi continued to perform in opera buffa in Italy until 1790.
