= Nicolas-Jean Lefroid de Méreaux =

French composer (1745–1797)

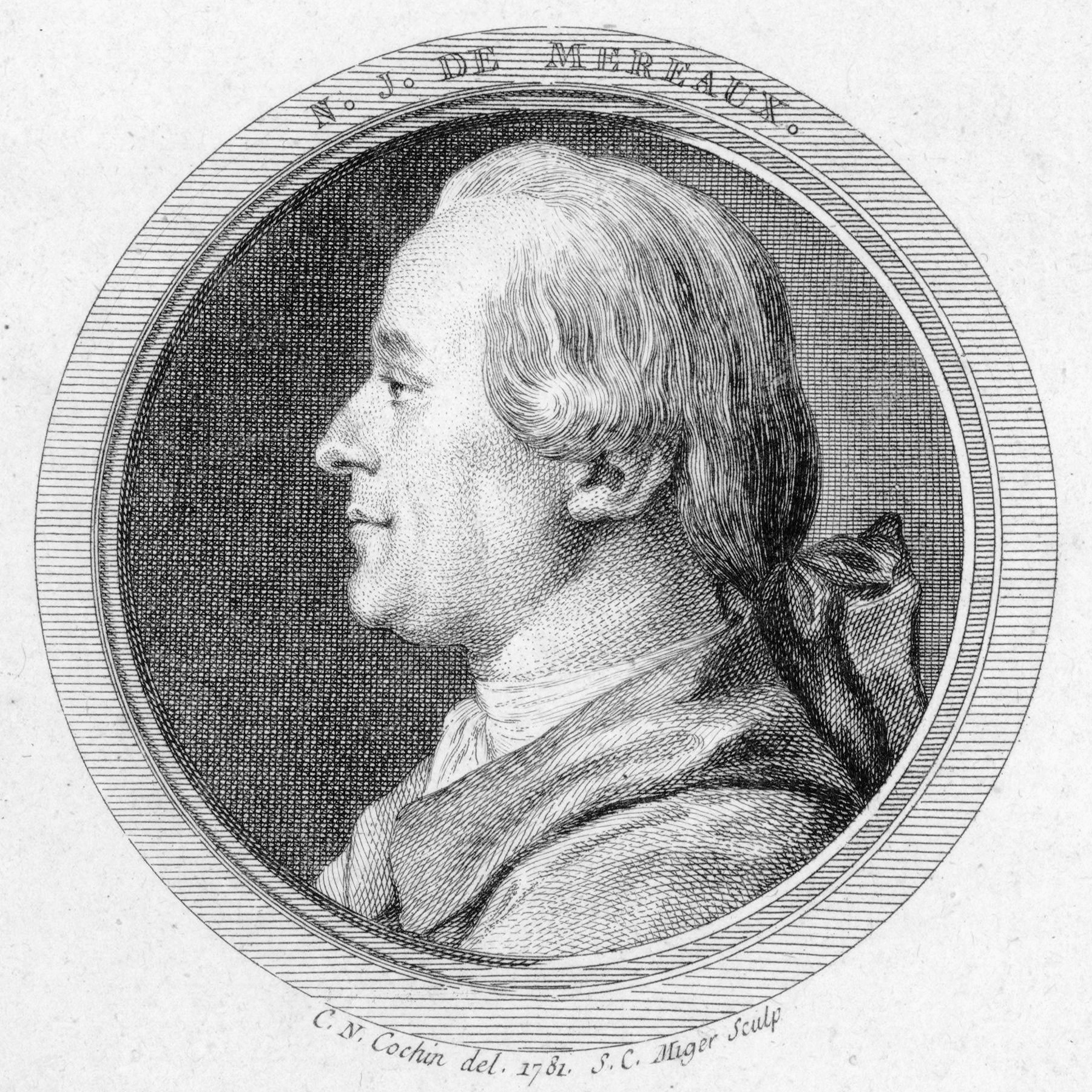
Méreaux c. 1781

Nicolas-Jean Lefroid de Méreaux (1745–1797) was a French composer born in Paris.

According to music critic François-Joseph Fétis, Méreaux studied music under French and Italian teachers before becoming the organist of the Church of Saint-Jacques-du-Haut-Pas. He wrote several motets for the church and had his oratorio Esther performed at the Concert Spirituel in 1775. His first published work was the cantata Aline, reine de Golconde in 1767. He went on to compose several operas.

His son, Joseph-Nicolas Lefroid de Méreaux (1767–1838), was also a composer, mostly of piano music.

== Operas ==
Title	Genre	Subdivisions	Libretto	Première date	Theatre	References
La ressource comique, ou La pièce à deux acteurs	comédie mêlée d'ariettes	prologue and 1 act	Louis Anseaume	22 August 1772	Théâtre des Italiens	
Le retour de tendresse	comédie mêlée d'ariettes	1 act	Louis Anseaume	1 October 1774	Théâtre des Italiens	
Le duel comique (with Paisiello)	opéra comique	2 acts	Pierre-Louis Moline	16 September 1776	Opéra-Comique	
Laurette	opéra	1 act	Danzel de Malzeville	23 July 1777	Comédie Italienne	
Alexandre aux Indes	tragédie lyrique	3 acts	Étienne Morel de Chédeville	26 August 1783	Paris Opéra	
Œdipe à Thèbes	tragédie lyrique	3 acts	Comte Duprat de Lantouloubre	30 December 1791	Paris Opéra	
Fabius	tragédie lyrique	3 acts	J. Martin (known as Barouillet)	9 August 1793	Paris Opéra	

== Sources ==
- Félix Clément and Pierre Larousse Dictionnaire des Opéras, Paris, 1881. Available online here .
- Benoît Dratwicki, "Foreigners at the Académie Royale de Musique" in Antonio Sacchini, Renaud, Madrid, Ediciones Singulares, 2013 (book accompanying the complete recording conducted by Christophe Rousset). ISBN 978-84-939-6865-6
- Fétis, Biographie universelle des musiciens, Brussels, 1840 edition, Volume 6
