= Charlotte Tardieu =

French composer, concert pianist and teacher

Marie Charlotte Elisabeth d'Arpentigny de Malleville Tardieu (9 September 1829 – May 1890) was a French composer, concert pianist, and teacher who organized chamber recitals throughout Europe. She composed and performed under the names Charlotte de Malleville or Charlotte Tardieu.

== Early life and career ==
Tardieu was born in Roncherolles (today Roncherolles sur le Vivier). She studied music in Rouen with Jean-Amédée le Froid de Méreaux. On 1 March 1853 she married Amédée Eugène Tardieu. They had two sons, André and Jacques, and settled in Paris. André's son, also named André Tardieu, would become the prime minister of France in 1929.

Tardieu presented piano recitals throughout Europe, and performed as the soloist in piano concerti by Mozart and Beethoven. She appeared with other musicians such as flutist Vincent Dorus, clarinetist Adolphe Leroy, the Maurin Chevillard string quartet, Jean Méreaux, Camille Saint-Saëns, violinist Pablo de Sarasate, oboist Charles Louis Triebert, cellist Olive Charlier Vaslin and oboist Louis Verroust. Well-known for her interpretation of Mozart, Tardieu specialized in older music and rarely performing music by contemporary composers other than herself. In 1864, she formed a trio with cellist Alfredo Piatti and violinist Camille Sivori. Georges Onslow dedicated his Septet for Piano and Wind Instruments, Op. 79 to her.

From 1849 to 1869, Tardieu organized four chamber concerts a year in the Pleyel and Erard concert halls in Paris, and the Sax concert hall in the Egmont Palace in Belgium. She formed at least one class to study classical piano repertoire with performers Casimir, Dorus, Gouffe, Lebouc, Maurin and Ney.

Tardieu's music was published by Henry Lemoine. Her compositions, all for piano, included:

- Berceuse, opus 7
- Carillon, opus 6
- First Prelude, opus 4
- Grande Valse Brillante, opus 3
- Second Prelude, opus 5
- Souvenirs de Trye-Château (Polka-March)
