= Amédée Méreaux =

French composer (1802–1874)

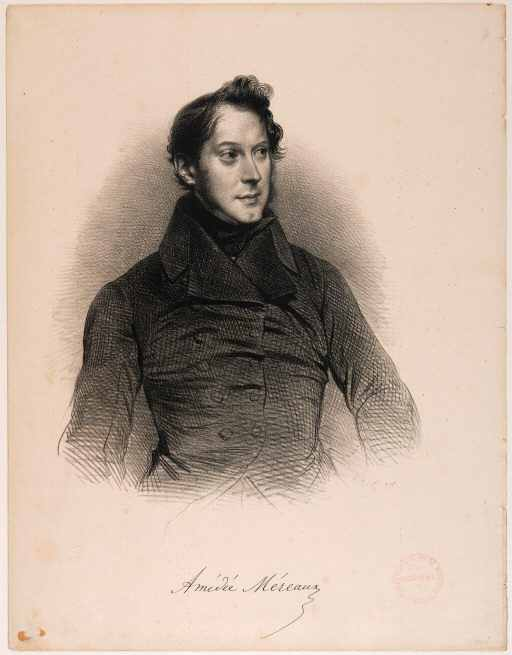
Engraving of Amédée Méreaux

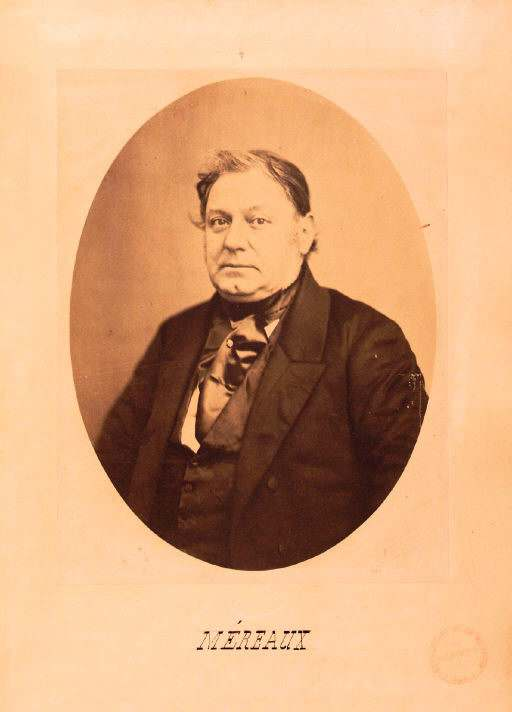
Photograph of Amédée Méreaux

Jean-Amédée Lefroid de Méreaux (18 September 1802 – 25 April 1874) was a French composer, pianist, piano teacher, musicologist and music critic. He is best known for his 60 Grandes Études, Op. 63.

== Family background ==
Amédée Méreaux came from a family of musicians. His father, Joseph-Nicolas Lefroid de Méreaux, composed for the piano and organ, whilst his grandfather, Nicolas-Jean Lefroid de Méreaux, mainly composed operas. Going up the family tree, one more generation is known; it consists of Pierre Lefroid de Méreaux (Méreaux's great-grandfather) and an unknown person (Méreaux's great-grandmother).

According to Antoine François Marmontel, Méreaux's father was "a professor of good merit, in ongoing relationships with all the musical celebrities at the time". The Lefroid de Méreaux seemed to have above-average status in French society, which comes from the fact that both Méreaux's father and grandfather had been professors with their own respective musical reputations. If this wasn't the case, they also wouldn't have connections to aristocracy, since a handful of Méreaux's early works are dedicated to noblemen and baronesses, which creates room for the possibility that Méreaux himself performed for aristocrats at a young age.

His family was in possession of a large collection of 17th-century music as well, which was passed down from his grandfather.

== Life and career ==
Jean-Amédée Lefroid de Méreaux was born as son and first child of Joseph-Nicolas Lefroid de Méreaux and Marie Angélique-Félicité Blondel (1774–1840), daughter of the lawyer Jean Blondel (1733–1810), on 18 September in Paris. His grandfather, Nicolas-Jean Lefroid de Méreaux (1745–1797), was a composer of operas and oratorios.

Méreaux's parents - especially his mother - wanted him to pursue a career in advocacy, so he received a very careful education at a young age, while learning to play piano from his father. Louise-Eugénie Lefroid de Méreaux (1808–1892), his sister, was born 6 years after him, on 28 February 1808. Their relationship with each other is unknown, but the Fantaisie et variations, Op. 11, and L'Inquiétude, Op. 20, both works of Méreaux, are dedicated to her.

At the age of ten, Méreaux took harmony lessons from Anton Reicha. During this time period, he rapidly progressed at piano playing and went on to study at the Lycée Charlemagne, where he received first prize in a piano competition the same year. It was clear that Méreaux wanted to pursue a career in music rather than in advocacy, so his parents - particularly his mother - placed his ambition over working in the fields of advocacy.

When Méreaux was barely 14 years of age, his father let his first works to be published, most-likely through his connections as a musician. After his studies at the Lycée Charlemagne, he went on to learn counterpoint and composition under Reicha, potentially at the Conservatoire de Paris in 1815, as Reicha had been a teacher there since 1809 at that point.

His compositions are known for their immense difficulty – Marc-André Hamelin considered them more difficult than those of Charles-Valentin Alkan. His best-known work is his 60 Grandes Études, Op. 63. Of this album, the "Bravura" étude, Op. 63 No. 24, has passages where the pianist's two hands cross over each other simultaneously every quaver, at the speed of = 100. Other immensely difficult works from the set include the "Scherzo alla Napolitana" étude, Op. 63 No. 45, which has only been played at roughly half tempo, and is widely considered to be his most difficult work. The "Toccata" étude, Op. 63 No. 20 stands out as well, containing speeds of demisemiquavers around octaves at = 160. However, not all of his works have such difficulties.

Although his works are considered by some, including Hamelin, to be unmusical, this view is not held by everyone. Despite his current obscurity, some of his Op. 63 études were included in piano collections edited by Isidor Philipp, and there is a street in Rouen named after him. In 2011, five of his Op. 63 études were recorded by Cyprien Katsaris.

As a musicologist, he is known for his study Les Clavecinistes de 1637 à 1790, written between 1864 and 1867. One of his students was Charlotte Tardieu, with whom he later performed.

He died in Rouen in 1874.

== Works ==
List of works in order

Op. 1 – La Biondina. (ca. 1815/1816)

Op. 2 – Rondeau pastoral. (ca. 1815/1816)

Op. 3 – Polonaise brillante. (ca. 1815/1816)

Op. 4 – Air créole.

Op. 5 – Variations sur un thème favori de Hændel: «God Save The Queen»

Op. 6 – Rondo brillant sur un motif de Sémiramis.

Op. 7 – Le Départ pour les champs. (1825?)

Op. 8 – Rondo sur la valse de Robin des Bois. (1821 or after)

Op. 9 – Rondo-valse.

Op. 10 – Les Cloches.

Op. 11 – Fantaisie et variations sur une canzonetta italienne de Righini.

Op. 12 – Duo concertant pour piano et violon. (1825–1827)

Op. 13 – Troix Rondeaux pour piano: No.1 (1825–1827)

Op. 14 – Variations concertantes pour piano et violon.

Op. 15 – Variations et Rondeau brillant. (1825–1828)

Op. 16 – Variations pour piano et violon.

Op. 17 – Caprice en forme de valse. (1825–1828)

Op. 18 – Polonaise brillante, avec accompagnement d'orchestre. (1827–1829)

Op. 19 – Variations pour piano, sur l'air: Do, do, l'enfant do. (1827–1829)

Op. 20 – L'Inquiétude. (1827–1829)

Op. 21 – Adagio, Variations et Polonaise, sur un thème favori de Carafa. (1827–1829)

Op. 22 – Les Matelots. (1827–1829)

Op. 23 – Thème original. (1827–1829)

Op. 24 – Variations brillantes sur la barcarolle favorite de la Muette de Portici. (1827–1829)

Op. 25 – Grandes Variations sur la marche de Moïse. (1829?)

Op. 26 – Troix Rondeaux pour piano: No.2 (1827–1829)

Op. 27 – Troix Rondeaux pour piano: No.3 (1827–1829)

Op. 28 – Variations brillantes sur la romance des Deux Nuits. (1829 or after)

Op. 29 – Rondino varié. (1829 or after)

Op. 30 – Sur l'eau qui te balance. (ca. 1829)

Op. 31 – Aïgues Caoutes. (ca. 1831–1832)

Op. 32 – Variations brillantes sur la Marche du Tournoi de Robert le Diable. (ca. 1832)

Op. 33 – Souvenirs de madame Cinti-Damoreau.

Op. 34 – Fantaisie et Variations sur le trio du Pré aux Clercs. (ca. 1832)

Op. 35 – Rondo brillant sur La tentation. (ca. 1832)

Op. 36 – Les Fleurs de Cinti. (1832–1833)

Op. 37 – Souvenir de Montagnes. (ca. 1833)

Op. 38 – Mélodies de G. Meyerbeer.

Op. 39 – Bonheur de se revoir. (ca. 1833–1834)

Op. 40 – Bravo! Bravo! (ca. 1833–1834)

Op. 41 – La Folle. (ca. 1835)

Op. 42 – Grande fantaisie sur La Juive. (ca. 1836)

Op. 43 – Variations de concert pour piano, sur un thème italien. (ca. 1836–1839)

Op. 44 – Fantaisie et variations brillantes pour piano, sur les coplets en trio et la sérénade de Marguerite. (ca. 1836–1839)

Op. 45 – Grande fantaisie sur une mazurka de Chopin. (ca. 1838–1839)

Op. 46 – Grande Valse. (ca. 1836–1840)

Op. 47 – 2 Mélodies.

Op. 48 – Romance de Guedron.

Op. 49 – Les Travailleurs français.

Op. 50 – Fantaisie et variations de concert sur l'air de Marlborough.

Op. 51 – Divertissement.

Op. 52 – Grande Valse.

Op. 53 – Pauvre Jeannette!.

Op. 54 – Pavane variée.

Op. 55 – Caprice-valse.

Op. 56 – Caprice à la hongroise.

Op. 57 – Variations brillantes sur l'air du Tra la la. (1849)

Op. 58 – Souvenirs de Normandie. (1855?)

Op. 59 – Première messe solennelle.

Op. 60 – Ballade. (1853?)

Op. 61 – Caprice-Mazurek. (1853)

Op. 62 – Idylle.

Op. 63 – Grandes études pour piano en 60 caprices caractéristiques, dans le style libre et dans le style sévère. (1855)

Op. 64 – Cantilènes concertantes en duo.

Op. 65 – Grand Caprice concertant sur Robert le Diable.

Op. 66 – La Brigantine.

Op. 67 – Le Retour de la Chasse.

Op. 68 – Grande fantaisie historique sur des airs français des seizième et dix-septième siècles.

Op. 69 – Grande fantaisie concertante sur la ballade de Preciosa.

Op. 70 – Trois valses caractéristiques. (1857–1859)

Op. 71 – Addio. (1859)

Op. 72 – Boléro. (1859)

Op. 73 – Eleganza. (1859)

Op. 74 – Grazia. (1859)

Op. 75 – Leggerezza. (1859)

Op. 76 – Prière.

Op. 77 – Canzonetta.

Op. 78 – Idylle.

Op. 79 – Marche hongroise.

Op. 80 – Berceuse.

Op. 81 – La Neige des Alpes.

Op. 82 – Messe du Dumont.

Op. 83 – 24 Transcriptions concertantes. (1861–1874)

Op. 84 – Romance-étude.

Op. 85 – Inquiétude.

Op. 86 – Les Travestissements.

Op. 87 – Une Chanson d'autrefois.

Op. 88 – Au bord de la Mer.

Op. 89 – Les Refrains oubliés. (1861–1867)

Op. 90 – Trois élévations.

Op. 91 – Offertoire.

Op. 92 – Les Blés et Veille de Bataille.

Op. 93 – Deuxième messe.

Op. 94 – Entr'acte-Gavotte de Mignon.

Op. 95 – Le Rappel. (1867)

Op. 96 – Berceuse sur une mélodie de Frédéric Deschamps. (1867)

Op. 97 – La Kermesse.

Op. 98 – Cantate chorale.

Op. 99 – Sonate élégiaque. (1870)

Op. 100 – Le Départ des Pèlerins. (1872)

Op. 101 – Souvenir de la Bastide. (1872)

Op. 102 – Grand trio.

Op. 103 – 10 Mélodies.

Op. 104 – Hymne du Matin. (1876?)

Op. 105 – Hymne de la Nuit. (1876?)

Op. 106 – Première nocturne.

Op. 107 – Deuxième nocturne.

Op. 108 – Helvetia.

Op. 109 – Humoresque.

Op. 110 – Marine.

Op. 111 – Rêve.

Op. 112 – Scherzo-valse.

Op. 113 – A la Veillée.

Op. 114 – Alla Monferine.

Op. 115 – Sur la Plage.

Op. 116 – Alla Pollaca.

Op. 117 – Dans la Forêt.

Op. 118 – Alla Francesse.

Opus posthumous

Polonaise brillante en si bemol.

Son doux Nom!

La Flûte Enchantée.

Il Trovatore (Miserere)

Il Trovatore (duettino)

Rigoletto.

Le Premier Jour de Bonheur.

La Traviata (largo du finale)

La Reine de Saba.

3 Mélodies célèbres de François Schubert.

Élégie pour piano.

2 Points d'orgue ajoutés au Concerto (No. 17) en mi bemol pour 2 pianos, de Mozart.

Concerto for two pianos.

String Quartet in D major. (1877)

Ave Maria.

Sonate.

Grand Concerto symphonique.

Marche solennelle.

Concertino militaire.

Le même.

Mélodie irlandaise variée.

Corinne.

O Salutaris.

Virgineis titulis.

Andante du premier concerto de Mendelssohn.

Adagio du concerto en si mineur, Op. 89, de Hummel.

Troisième nocturne.

L'enfant.
