= Canente (Collasse) =

Opera by Pascal Collasse

Canente (English: Canens) is an opera by the French composer Pascal Collasse, first performed at the Académie Royale de Musique (the Paris Opéra) on 4 November 1700. It takes the form of a tragédie lyrique in a prologue and five acts. The libretto is by Antoine Houdar de la Motte. A new setting by the composer Antoine Dauvergne appeared in 1760.

== Roles ==
Cast	Voice type	Premiere
Circé (Circe), enchantress and daughter of the Sun		
Tiber		
Picus, the first king of Italy		
Canente (Canens), a nymph		
Saturne (Saturn)		
Nérine, Circe's confidante		
La Nuit (Night)		
L'Amour (Cupid)		
Saturn's followers, representing the four ages		
Une bergère (a shepherdess)		
Une fleuve (a river, follower of Tiber)		
The Furies: Alecton (Alecto), Erinnis, Mégere (Megaera)		
Chorus: Divinities of the waters, followers of Tiber; magicians and ministers of Circe; Games, Pleasures and Graces, followers of Cupid; peoples.

== Synopsis ==
The enchantress Circe has helped Picus become King of Latium because she is in love with him. But Picus is in love with the nymph Canens. However, the River Tiber is also in love with Canens and threatens to flood Latium if she marries Picus. Circe abducts the nymph and orders her demons to torment Canens, but she manages to win them over and is rescued by a group of Cupids. Circe tells Picus that Canens is going to marry Tiber, but all her magic cannot alter his love for the nymph. Circe resorts to revenge and sends the Furies to destroy the wedding of Picus and Canens. But the Furies are thwarted by Cupid, Circe admits defeat and the lovers are finally married.

== Sources ==
- Félix Clément and Pierre Larousse Dictionnaire des Opéras, Paris, 1881, page 134.
- (in French) Libretto at "Livrets baroques"
