= Alexandre aux Indes =

1783 opera by Nicolas-Jean Lefroid de Méreaux

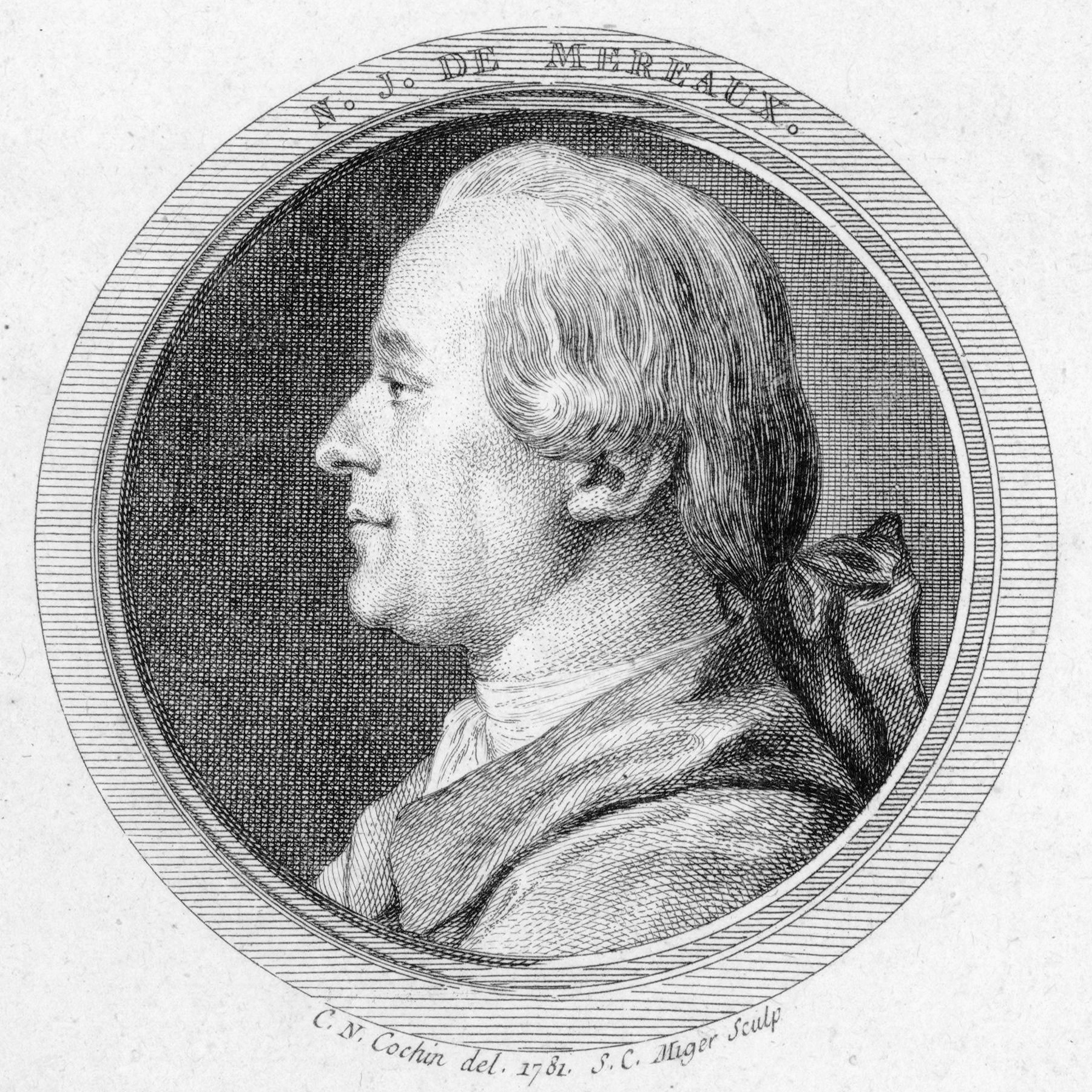
Méreaux c. 1781

Alexandre aux Indes (Alexander in India) is an opera by the French composer Nicolas-Jean Lefroid de Méreaux, first performed at the Académie Royale de Musique (the Paris Opera) on 26 August 1783. It takes the form of a tragédie lyrique in three acts. The libretto, by Étienne Morel de Chédeville, concerns Alexander the Great and the Indian king Porus. The plot has similarities with Racine's tragedy Alexandre le Grand (1665) and Metastasio's libretto Alessandro nell'Indie.

== Roles ==
Cast	Voice type	Premiere
Alexandre (Alexander the Great), King of Macedon and conqueror of the Persians	haute-contre	Étienne Lainez
Porus, king of one part of India	basse-taille (bass-baritone)	Henri Larrivée
Axiane, queen of another part of India	soprano	Marie Thérèse Davoux Maillard
Ephestion (Hephaestion), Alexander's confidant and ambassador	tenor	Jean-Joseph Rousseau
Gandartès, Porus' confidant	baritone	François Lays
Le grand prêtre de Bacchus (the high priest of Bacchus)	bass-baritone	Auguste-Athanase (Augustin) Chéron
Une dame indienne (an Indian lady)	soprano	Anne-Marie Jeanne Gavaudan, l'ainée (the elder)
Un capitaine grec (a Greek captain)	bass-baritone	Moreau
Six femmes de la suite d'Axiane (six women followers of Axiane)	soprano	Châteauvieux, Marie-Anne Thaunat, Gertrude Girardin, Rosalie, Josephine, Adelaïde Gavaudan cadette (the younger)
Un officier grec (a Greek officer)	tenor	Dufrenai (also spelled Dufrenaye or Dufresnay)
Un officier indien (an Indian officer)	baritone	Louis-Claude-Armand Chardin ("Chardiny")
Chorus: Greek warriors, Indian warriors, Indian peoples

== Synopsis ==
King Porus is due to marry Axiane when he hears news that Alexander the Great is threatening his kingdom. Hephaestion arrives and offers Porus the choice of submission to Alexander or war. Porus chooses to resist. In the ensuing battle, Porus is abandoned by his men but bravely fights single-handedly against a band of enemies, until he is captured. He pretends to be a simple officer. Alexander, who admires his courage, lets him go free. Axiane now arrives and begs Alexander to show mercy. Alexander agrees but only if Porus submits. Porus, however, renews the fight. Alexander besieges him and just as Porus is about to be captured again, Axiane throws herself in the way of Alexander's soldiers. Alexander asks Porus how he wishes to be treated. He replies: as a king. Alexander allows Porus to keep his lands and Axiane. Porus is moved and offers Alexander his loyalty and friendship.

== Sources ==
- (in French) Félix Clément and Pierre Larousse Dictionnaire des Opéras, p.21.
- (in French) Original libretto at BNF Gallica
- (in French) Original printed score at BNF Gallica
