= Thémistocle =

Tragédie lyrique by François-André Danican Philidor

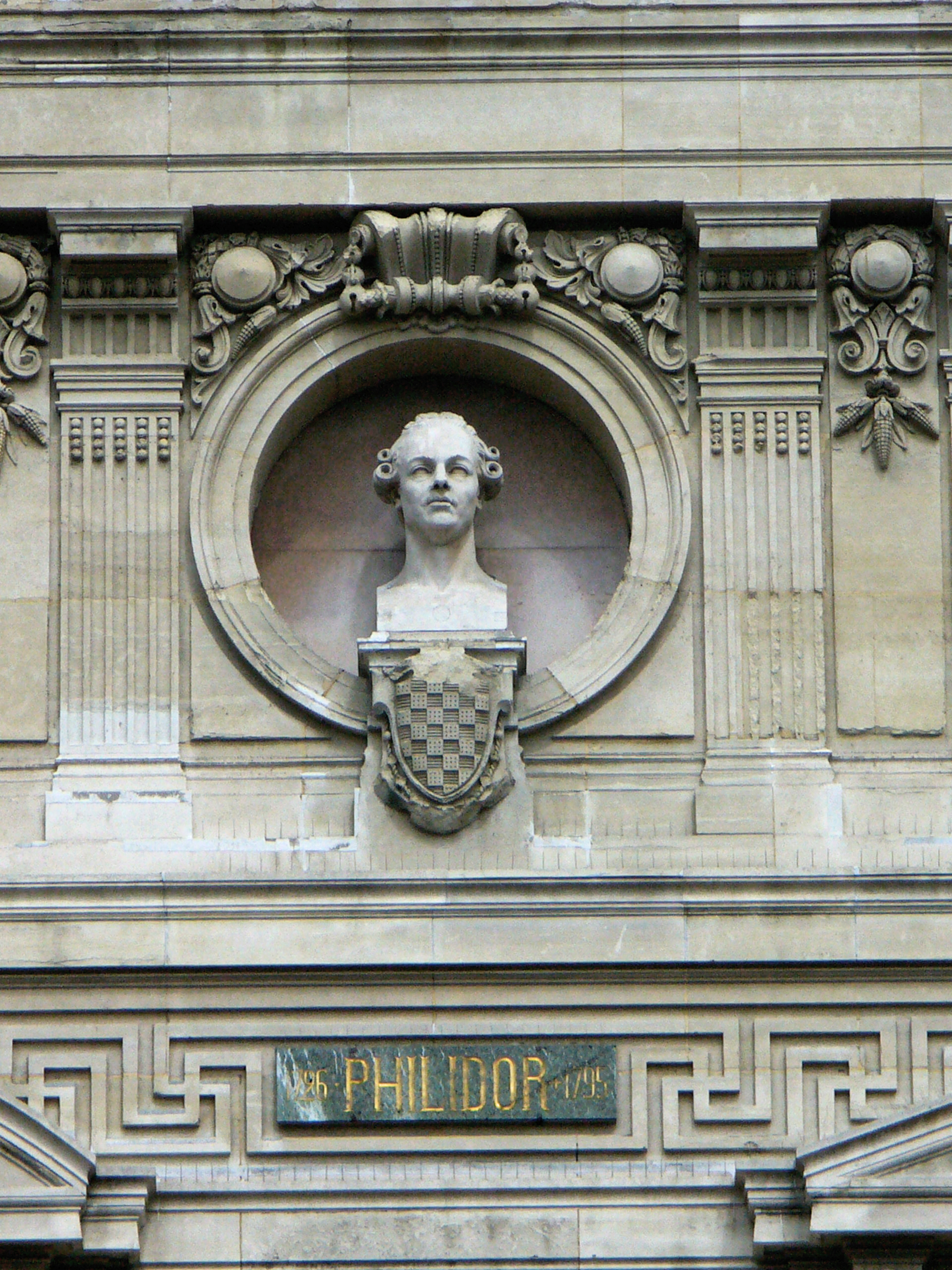
Philidor's bust on the façade of the Opera Garnier in Paris

Thémistocle (Themistocles) is an opera by the French composer François-André Danican Philidor, first performed at Fontainebleau on 13 October 1785. It transferred to the Académie Royale de Musique, Paris (the Paris Opera) on 23 May 1786. It takes the form of a tragédie lyrique in three acts. The libretto, by Étienne Morel de Chédeville, is based on the life of the ancient Greek statesman Themistocles.

== See also ==
- Philidor's other works: Blaise le savetier (1759), Le maréchal ferrant (1761), Tom Jones (1765), Ernelinde (1767), Persée (1780)

== Sources ==
- (in French) Félix Clément and Pierre Larousse Dictionnaire des Opéras, p.658
