= Orfeo ed Euridice =

1762 opera by Christoph Willibald Gluck

- Opera by Christoph Willibald Gluck
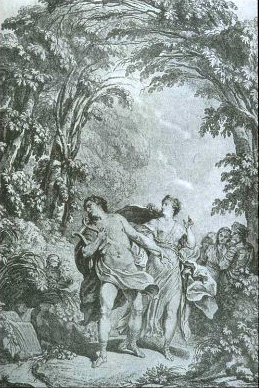
- Illustration from the first printed score (1764)
- Librettist: Ranieri de' Calzabigi
- Language: Italian
- Based on: myth of Orpheus
- Premiere: 5 October 1762; Burgtheater, Vienna

Orfeo ed Euridice (Italian: [orˈfɛːo ed euriˈdiːtʃe]; French: Orphée et Eurydice; English: Orpheus and Eurydice) is an opera composed by Christoph Willibald Gluck, based on the myth of Orpheus and set to a libretto by Ranieri de' Calzabigi. It belongs to the genre of the azione teatrale, meaning an opera on a mythological subject with choruses and dancing. The piece was first performed at the Burgtheater in Vienna on 5 October 1762, in the presence of Empress Maria Theresa. Orfeo ed Euridice is the first of Gluck's "reform" operas, in which he attempted to replace the abstruse plots and overly complex music of opera seria with a "noble simplicity" in both the music and the drama.

The opera is the most popular of Gluck's works, and was one of the most influential on subsequent German operas. Though originally set to an Italian libretto, Orfeo ed Euridice owes much to the genre of French opera, particularly in its use of accompanied recitative and a general absence of vocal virtuosity. Indeed, twelve years after the 1762 premiere, Gluck re-adapted the opera to suit the tastes of a Parisian audience at the Académie Royale de Musique with a libretto by Pierre-Louis Moline. This reworking was given the title Orphée et Eurydice, and several alterations were made in vocal casting and orchestration to suit French tastes.

== Background ==
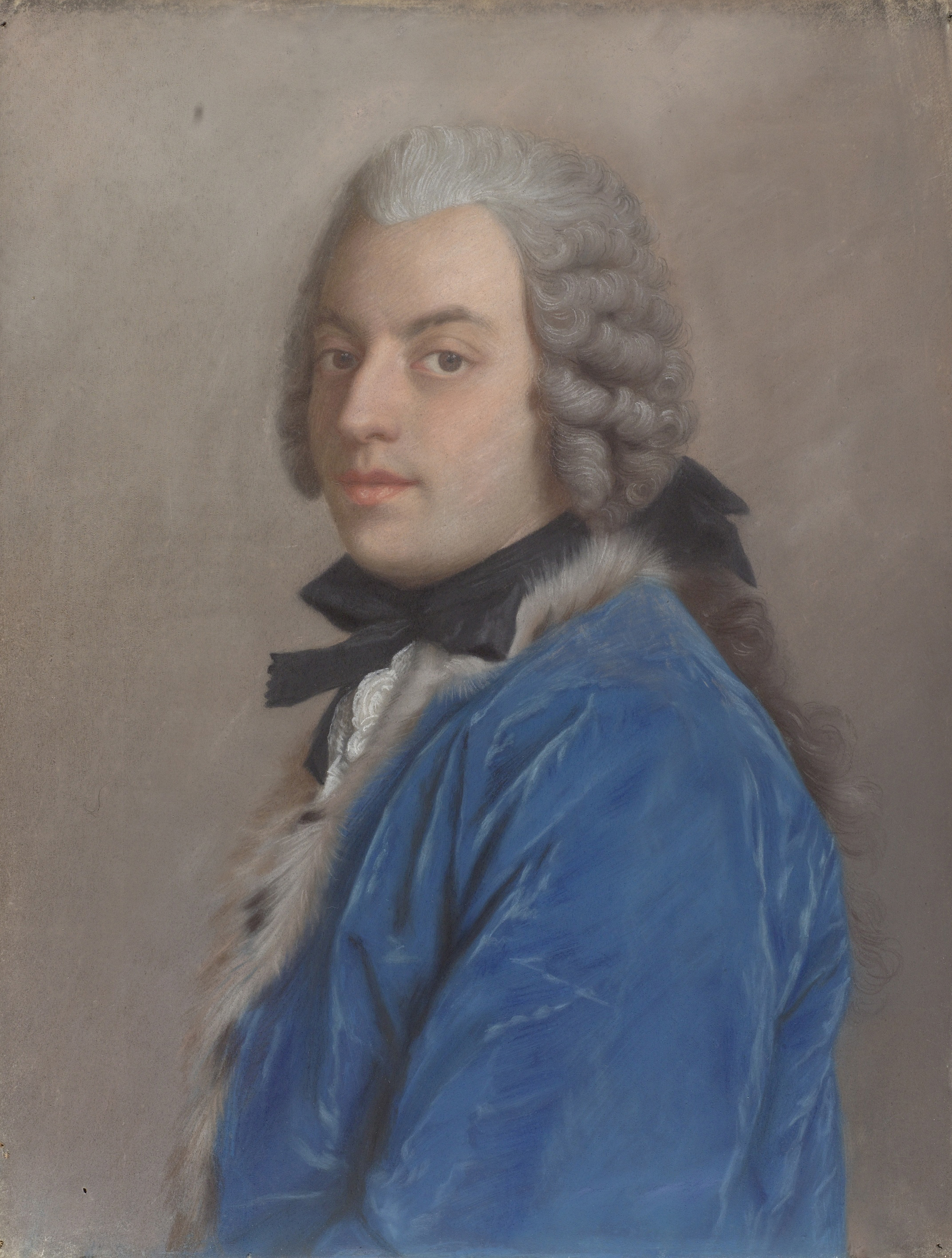
Algarotti by Jean-Étienne Liotard in the Rijksmuseum

Francesco Algarotti's Essay on the Opera (1755) was a major influence in the development of Gluck's reformist ideology. Algarotti proposed a heavily simplified model of opera seria, with the drama pre-eminent, instead of the music or ballet or staging. The drama itself should "delight the eyes and ears, to rouse up and to affect the hearts of an audience, without the risk of sinning against reason or common sense". Algarotti's ideas influenced both Gluck and his librettist, Calzabigi. Calzabigi was himself a prominent advocate of reform, and he stated, "If Mr Gluck was the creator of dramatic music, he did not create it from nothing. I provided him with the material or the chaos, if you like. We therefore share the honour of that creation."

Other influences included the composer Niccolò Jommelli and his maître de ballet at Stuttgart, Jean-Georges Noverre. Noverre's Lettres sur la danse (1760) called for dramatic effect over acrobatic ostentation; Noverre was himself influenced by the operas of Rameau and the acting style of David Garrick. The considerable quantity of ballet in Orfeo ed Euridice is thought to be due to his influence. Jommelli himself was noted for his blending of all aspects of the production: ballet, staging, and audience.

The ending of Orfeo ed Euridice, in which the god Amore restores Euridice back to life to be reunited happily with Orfeo, is a significant departure from the normally tragic ending of the myth of Orpheus and Eurydice. In the preface to the original score, Calzabigi wrote, "In order to accommodate the legend to our theatre, I had to transform the ending." According to Patricia Howard, this ending has been harshly criticized and often dismissed by later critics as a product of the opera premiering on the name day of the Emperor Francis I, a celebratory event. However, Orfeo ed Euridice was planned and written before its premiere date was set, and was performed privately at least twice prior to its premiere without provoking criticism over its ending; contemporary audiences were fully accustomed to the deus ex machina happy ending, which was a usual convention in neoclassical drama.

== Roles ==
Roles, voice types, premiere casts
Role	Voice type	Vienna premiere cast 5 October 1762	Revised Italian version Parma premiere cast 24 August 1769 Conductor: Gluck	Revised French version Paris premiere cast 2 August 1774
Orfeo	alto castrato (Vienna premiere), soprano castrato (Parma premiere), haute-contre (high tenor, French premiere)	Gaetano Guadagni	Giuseppe Millico	Joseph Legros
Amore	soprano (en travesti)	Lucia Clavereau	Felicita Suardi	Rosalie Levasseur
Euridice	soprano	Marianna Bianchi	Antonia Maria Girelli-Aguilar	Sophie Arnould
Chorus and dancers: shepherds, shepherdesses, nymphs, demons, Furies, happy spirits, heroes and heroines

== Synopsis ==
The first lines of arias, choruses, etc., are given in Italian (1762 version) and French (1774 version).

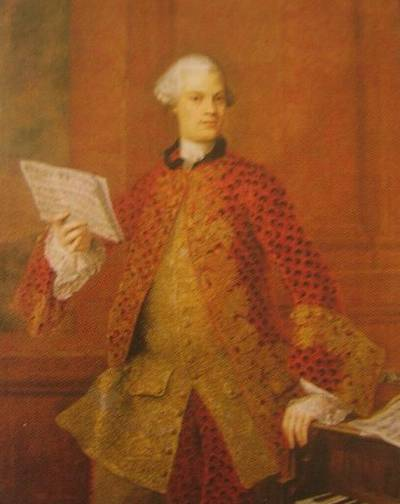
Gaetano Guadagni, the first Orfeo

=== Act 1 ===
A chorus of nymphs and shepherds join Orfeo around the tomb of his wife Euridice in a solemn chorus of mourning; Orfeo is only able to utter Euridice's name (Chorus and Orfeo: "Ah, se intorno"/"Ah! Dans ce bois"). Orfeo sends the others away and sings of his grief in the aria "Chiamo il mio ben"/"Objet de mon amour", the three verses of which are preceded by expressive recitatives. This technique was extremely radical at the time and indeed proved overly so for those who came after Gluck: Mozart chose to retain the unity of the aria. Amore (Cupid) appears, telling Orfeo that he may go to the Underworld and return with his wife on the condition that he not look at her until they are back on earth (1774 only: aria by Amour, "Si les doux accords"). As encouragement, Amore informs Orfeo that his present suffering shall be short-lived with the aria "Gli sguardi trattieni"/"Soumis au silence". Orfeo resolves to take on the quest. In the 1774 version only he delivers an ariette ("L'espoir renaît dans mon âme") in the older, showier, Italian style, originally composed for an occasional entertainment, Il Parnaso confuso (1765), and subsequently re-used in another one, Le feste d'Apollo (1769).

=== Act 2 ===
In a rocky landscape, the Furies refuse to admit Orfeo to the Underworld, and sing of Cerberus, its canine guardian ("Chi mai dell'Erebo"/"Quel est l'audacieux"). When Orfeo, accompanied by his lyre (represented in the opera by a harp), begs for pity in the aria "Deh placatevi con me"/"Laissez-vous toucher", he is at first interrupted by cries of "No!"/"Non!" from the Furies, but they are eventually softened by the sweetness of his singing in the arias "Mille pene"/"Ah! La flamme" and "Men tiranne"/"La tendresse", and let him in ("Ah, quale incognito affetto"/"Quels chants doux"). In the 1774 version, the scene ends with the "Dance of the Furies" (No. 28).

The second scene opens in Elysium. The brief ballet of 1762 became the four-movement "Dance of the Blessed Spirits" (with a prominent part for solo flute) in 1774. This is followed (1774 only) by a solo which celebrates happiness in eternal bliss ("Cet asile"), sung by either an unnamed Spirit or Euridice, and repeated by the chorus. Orfeo arrives and marvels at the purity of the air in an arioso ("Che puro ciel"/"Quel nouveau ciel"). But he finds no solace in the beauty of the surroundings, for Euridice is not yet with him. He implores the spirits to bring her to him, which they do (Chorus: "Torna, o bella"/"Près du tendre objet").

=== Act 3 ===
"Che farò senza Euridice" (in German)
Ernestine Schumann-Heink (1907)

On the way out of Hades, Euridice is delighted to be returning to earth, but Orfeo, remembering the condition related by Amore in act 1, lets go of her hand and refusing to look at her, does not explain anything to her. She does not understand his action and reproaches him, but he must suffer in silence (Duet: "Vieni, appaga il tuo consorte"/"Viens, suis un époux"). Euridice takes this to be a sign that he no longer loves her, and refuses to continue, concluding that death would be preferable. She sings of her grief at Orfeo's supposed infidelity in the aria "Che fiero momento"/"Fortune ennemie" (in 1774, there is a brief duet before the reprise). Unable to take any more, Orfeo turns and looks at Euridice; again, she dies. Orfeo sings of his grief in the famous aria "Che farò senza Euridice?"/"J'ai perdu mon Eurydice" ("What shall I do without Euridice?"/"I have lost my Euridice") Orfeo decides he will kill himself to join Euridice in Hades, but Amore returns to stop him (1774 only: Trio: "Tendre Amour"). In reward for Orfeo's continued love, Amore returns Euridice to life, and she and Orfeo are reunited. After a four-movement ballet, all sing in praise of Amore ("Trionfi Amore"). In the 1774 version, the chorus ("L'Amour triomphe") precedes the ballet, to which Gluck had added three extra movements.

== Performance history ==
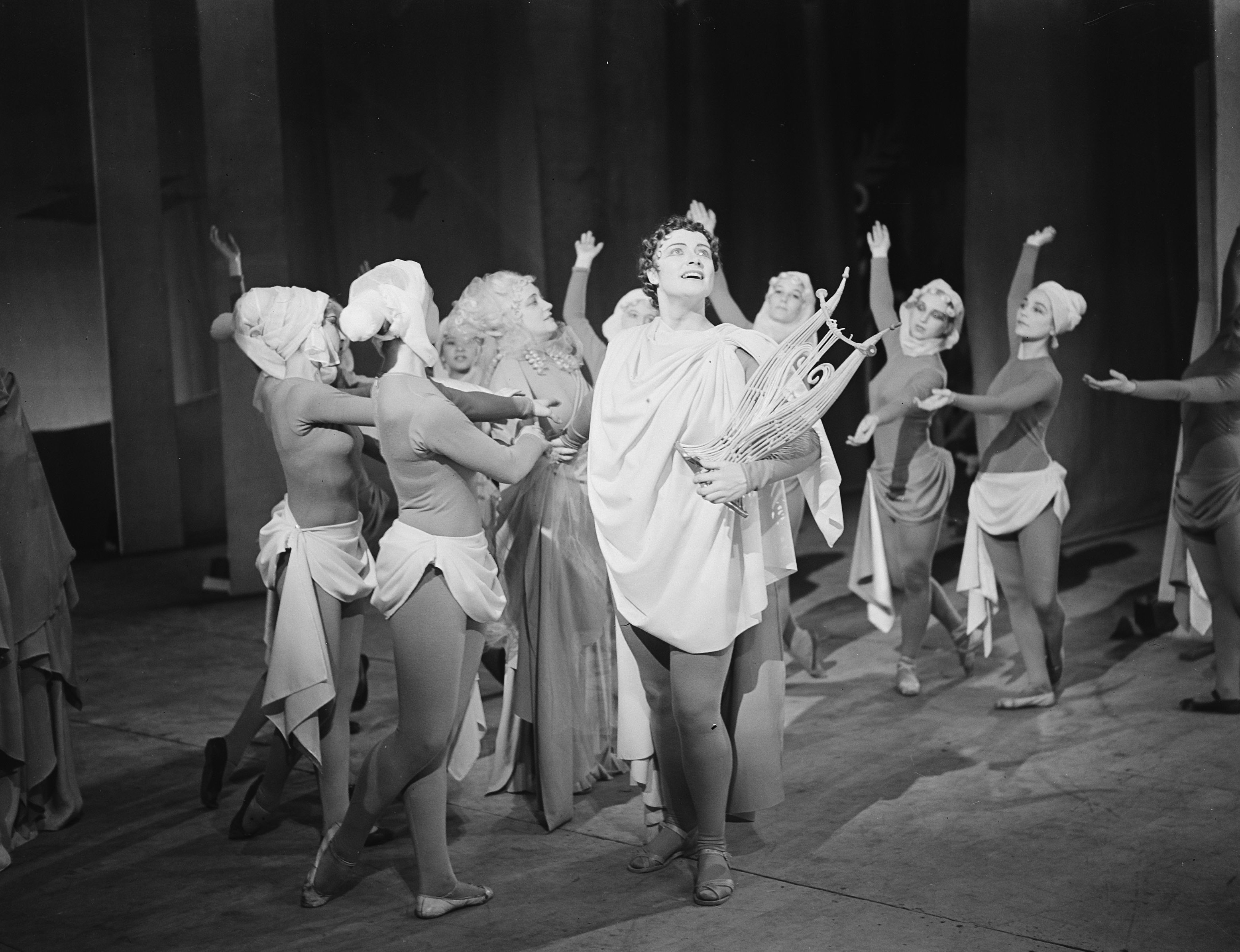
Ferrier in Orfeo & Eurydice (1949)

The opera was first performed in Vienna at the Burgtheater on 5 October 1762, for the name day celebrations of the Emperor Francis I. The production was supervised by the reformist theatre administrator, Count Giacomo Durazzo. Choreography was by Gasparo Angiolini, and set designs were by Giovanni Maria Quaglio the Elder, both leading members of their fields. The first Orfeo was the famous castrato Gaetano Guadagni. Orfeo was revived in Vienna during the following year, but then not performed until 1769. For the performances that took place in London in 1770, Guadagni sang the role of Orpheus, but little of the music bore any relation to Gluck's original, with J. C. Bach – "the English Bach" – providing most of the new music. Haydn conducted a performance of the Italian version at Eszterháza in 1776.

During the early 19th century, Adolphe Nourrit became particularly well known for his performances of Orpheus at the Paris Opera. In 1854 Franz Liszt conducted the work at Weimar, composing a symphonic poem of his own to replace Gluck's original overture. Typically during the 19th century and for most of the 20th century, the role of Orfeo was sung by a female contralto, and noted interpreters of the role from this time include Dame Clara Butt, Kathleen Ferrier and Ewa Podleś, and the mezzo-sopranos Rita Gorr, Marilyn Horne, Dame Janet Baker, Susanne Marsee, and Risë Stevens (at the Metropolitan Opera). Among conductors, Arturo Toscanini was a notable proponent of the opera. His November 1952 radio broadcast of act 2 was eventually released on LP and CD.

In 2017 the Lyric Opera of Chicago presented a new production by choreographer John Neumeier which fuses the musical and ballet elements of the opera and features the Joffrey Ballet. The production uses the 1774 "Paris version" (albeit with a rearranged finale), with the part of Orfeo being sung by a tenor. The main characters are presented in a modern setting with Orfeo as a choreographer, Euridice as his principal dancer, and Amour as his assistant. The same production was staged by the Los Angeles Opera in 2018 and by the Hamburg State Opera and the Festspielhaus Baden-Baden in 2019.

== Revised versions ==
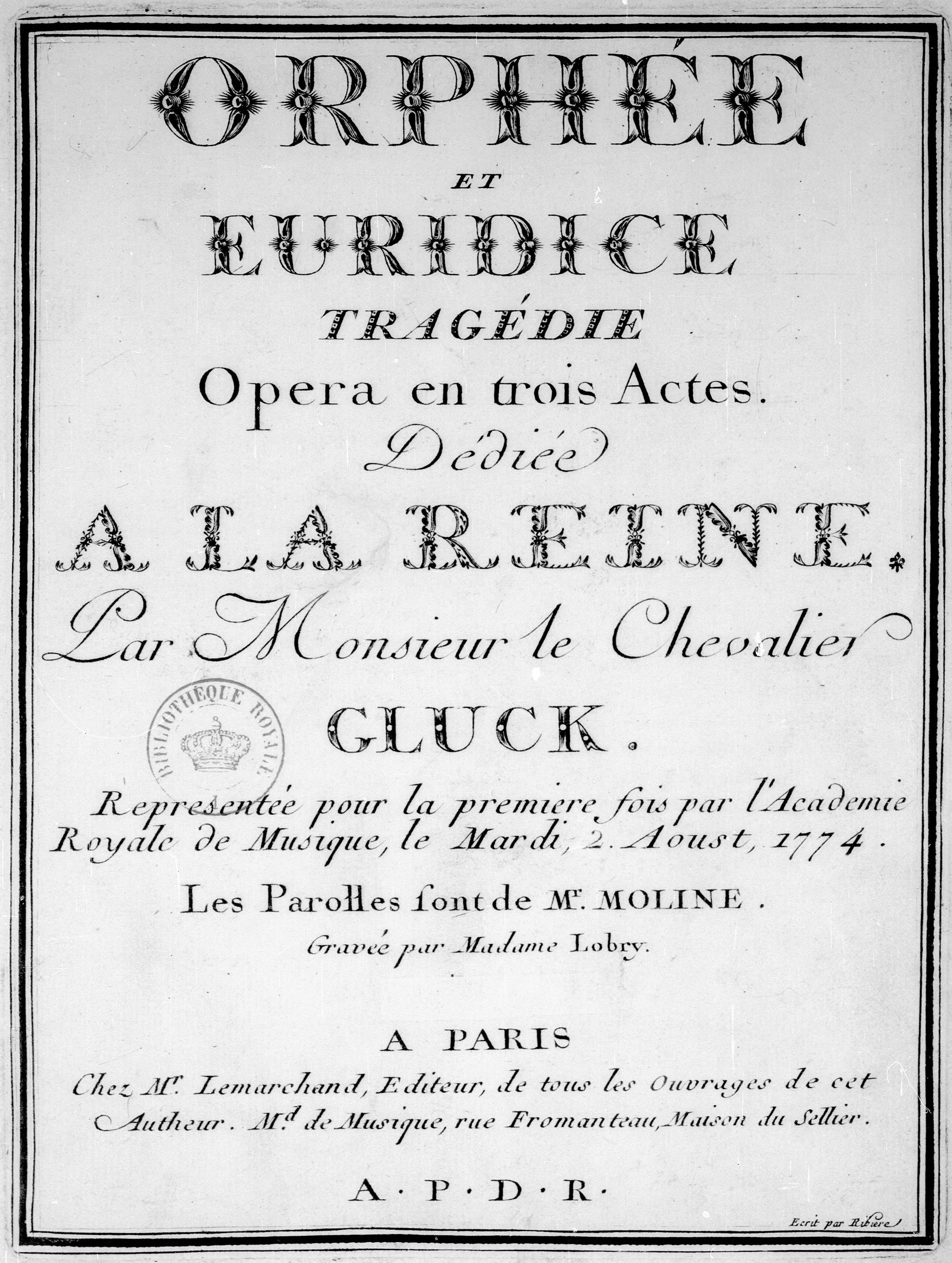
Title page of the 1774 French version, as published by Lemarchand

=== 1769 Parma version ===
In 1769, for Le feste d'Apollo at Parma (which was conducted by the composer), Gluck transposed the role of Orfeo up for the soprano castrato Giuseppe Millico, maintaining Calzabigi's original libretto, albeit reduced to a single act and renamed Atto d'Orfeo.

After not having been performed for a very long time, this version was finally given its first modern revival on 13 November 2014 at the Tage Alter Musik in Herne, Germany, with a countertenor in the title role. It was staged again, with Cecilia Bartoli in the male lead, at the 2023 Salzburg Whitsun Festival and later at Cremona's Teatro Ponchielli in June 2025.

=== Gluck's 1774 Paris Opera version ===
Gluck revised the score again for a production by the Paris Opera premiering on 2 August 1774 at the second Salle du Palais-Royal. Renamed Orphée et Eurydice, this version had a French libretto by Pierre-Louis Moline, which expanded as well as translated Calzabigi's original. Gluck composed additional music and made other adjustments such as shifting Orpheus down to a high tenor, or haute-contre, from castrato, to suit the convention in French opera for heroic characters (the French almost never used castratos). The opera now had more ballet sequences, conforming to Paris taste, including the long "Dance of the Furies" originally written for Gluck's ballet Don Juan and the "Dance of the Blessed Spirits" for flute and strings. (By 1825 operatic castrati themselves had virtually vanished, and performances of the original version for castrato became increasingly rare. The modern practice of approximating castrati by using countertenors as replacements dates back only to 1950.)

=== Berlioz's 1859 version for mezzo-soprano ===
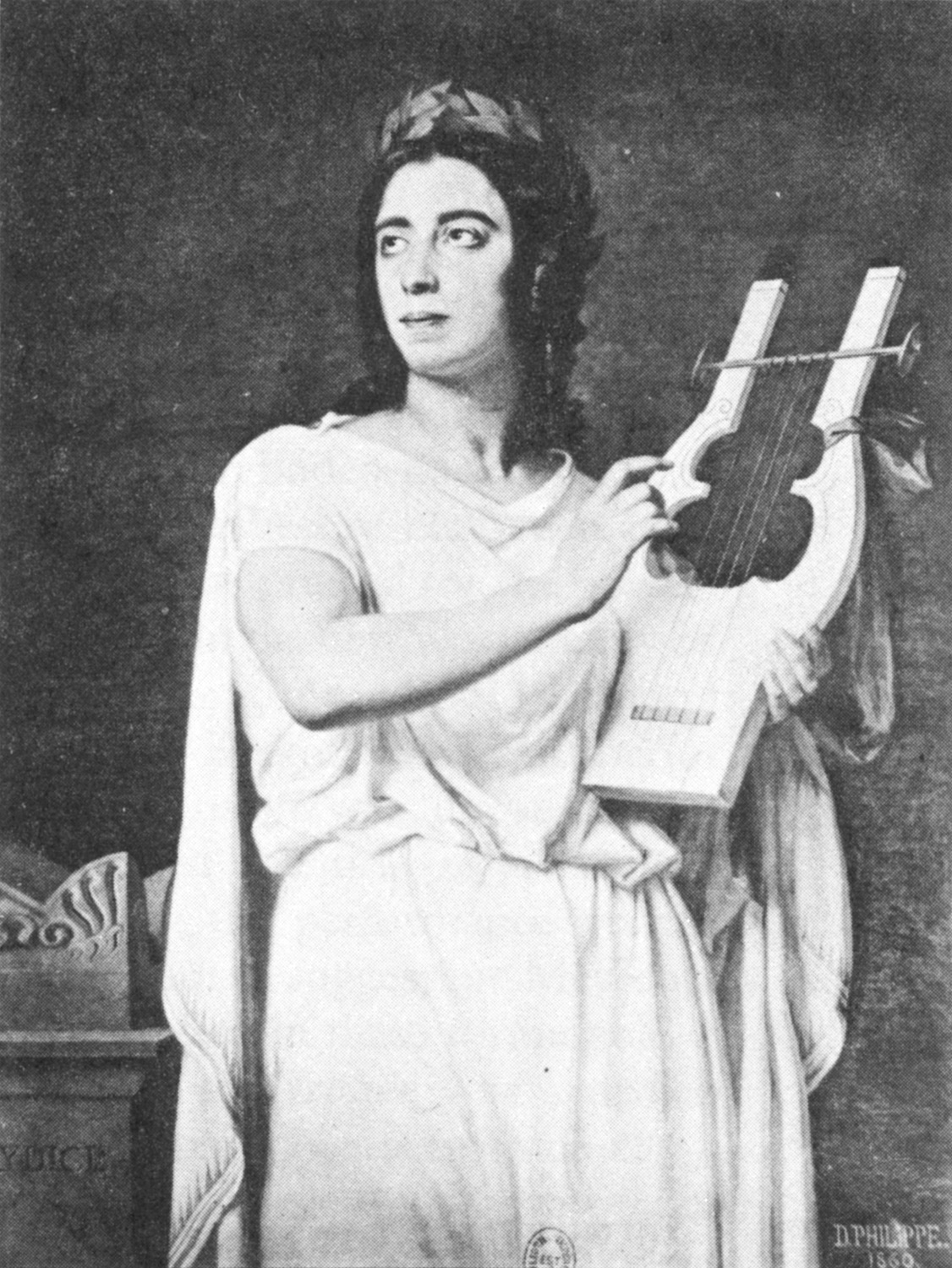
Pauline Viardot as Orphée

From 1784 to 1859 the Parisian diapason (concert pitch) rose steadily from 820 to 896 cycles per second, thus Gluck's French version for haute-contre became increasingly impractical. When Adolphe Nourrit sang the role at the Opéra in 1824 his music was altered. Giacomo Meyerbeer suggested to the French mezzo-soprano Pauline Viardot that she should perform the role of Orfeo. The composer Hector Berlioz was a close friend of Viardot and the leading expert in France on the music of Gluck. He knew the score of "the largely forgotten Italian original as thoroughly as he knew the French", and agreed to prepare a version of the opera – in four acts – with Viardot's voice in mind: thus, he did not simply "return to the original contralto version, but rearranged and retransposed the Paris version into keys more suitable for a mezzo". In his adaptation, Berlioz used the key scheme of the 1762 Vienna score while incorporating much of the additional music of the 1774 Paris score. He returned to the Italian version only when he considered it to be superior either in terms of music or in terms of the drama. He also restored some of the more subtle orchestration from the Italian version and resisted proposals by Viardot and the theatre's director Léon Carvalho to modernize the orchestration. In the end Camille Saint-Saëns, who was acting as Berlioz's assistant on the project, did some of the minor rewriting which Berlioz had declined to do.

The Berlioz version was first presented at the Théâtre Lyrique on 18 November 1859 with Viardot as Orphée, Marie Sasse as Eurydice, Marie Ernestine Marimon as L'Amour, Mlle Moreau as L'Ombre, and Adolphe Deloffre as the conductor. The sets were designed by Charles-Antoine Cambon and Joseph Thierry, and the choreography was by Lucien Petipa. (The seventeen-year-old Jules Massenet was the orchestra's timpanist. During the rehearsals Berlioz had complimented the young player on the accuracy of his tuning.) The production was a popular and critical success, filling the house every night, and was given a total of 138 times by the company.

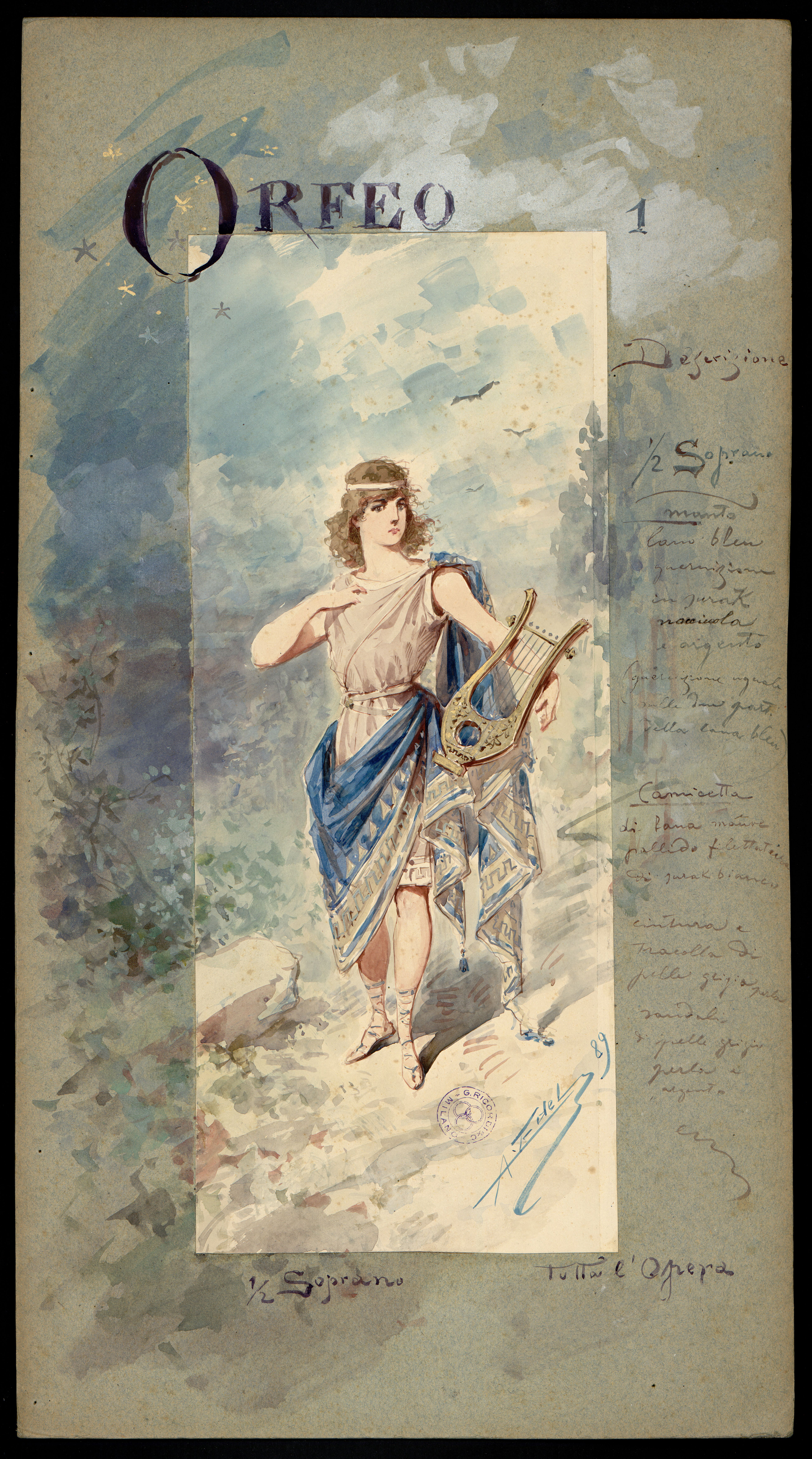
Orfeo (mezzosoprano), costume design for a four-act Orfeo (1889)

=== Subsequent versions ===
By 1860 most theaters in Paris had lowered concert pitch to diapason normal. This was not as low as in Gluck's time: "a Commission had lately recommended that the pitch in France should be lowered from an A of 896 to 870 vibrations." Still this was apparently enough that later in the 19th century the role of Orpheus came to be sung almost as frequently by a tenor as by a contralto.

Berlioz's version is one of many which combine the Italian and French scores, although it is the most influential and well regarded. Since about 1870 three-act adaptations of the Berlioz score, translating it back into Italian and restoring much of the music from the 1774 French version which Berlioz had left out, were common. An 1889 edition for contralto, published by Ricordi, became the most popular. On occasion the role of Orfeo has even been transposed down an octave for a baritone to sing. Dietrich Fischer-Dieskau and Hermann Prey are two notable baritones who have performed the role in Germany. Fischer-Dieskau recorded the opera several times; his recordings are still available commercially.

== Orfeo and the reform ==
The opera was the first by Gluck showing signs of his ambition to reform opera seria. Self-contained arias and choruses make way for shorter pieces strung together to make larger structural units. Da capo arias are notable by their absence; Gluck instead uses strophic form, notably in act one's "Chiamo il mio ben così", where each verse is interposed with dramatic recitative, – that is, stromentato, where the voice is accompanied by part or all of the orchestra – and rondo form, such as in act three's famous "Che farò senza Euridice?". Also absent is traditional secco recitative, where the voice is accompanied only by the basso continuo. On the whole, old Italian operatic conventions are disregarded in favour of giving the action dramatic impetus. The complexity of the storyline is greatly reduced by eliminating subplots. Gluck was influenced by the example of French tragédies en musique, particularly those of Rameau. Like them, the opera contains a large number of expressive dances, extensive use of the chorus and accompanied recitative. The coup de théâtre of opening the drama with a chorus mourning one of the main characters is very similar to that used in Rameau's Castor et Pollux (1737). Other elements do not follow Gluck's subsequent reforms; for instance, the brisk, cheerful overture does not reflect the action to come. The role of Orfeo calls for an especially gifted actor, so that the strophic "Chiamo il mio ben così" does not become dull, and so that tragic import can be given both to this aria and to "Che farò senza Euridice?", both of which are based on harmonies that are not obviously mournful in nature. The first Orfeo, Gaetano Guadagni, was reputedly a fine actor who had certainly taken lessons while in London from the Shakespearian actor David Garrick. Guadagni was apparently also able to project a moving and emotive tone without raising his voice. Indeed, Gluck faced criticism of "Che farò senza Euridice?" on the grounds that it was emotionally uninvolved; he responded by pointing out the absolute necessity of fine execution of the aria: "make the slightest change, either in the movement or in the turn of expression, and it will become a saltarello for marionettes".

Gluck's reforms, which began with Orfeo ed Euridice, have had significant influence throughout operatic history. Gluck's ideals heavily influenced the popular works of Mozart, Wagner, and Weber, with Wagner's Gesamtkunstwerk vision especially influenced by that of Gluck. Old-style opera seria and the domination of embellishment-orientated singers came to be increasingly unpopular after the success of Gluck's operas as a whole and Orfeo in particular. In Orfeo ed Euridice the orchestra is far more predominant than in earlier opera, most notably in Orfeo's arioso "Che puro ciel". Here the voice is reduced to the comparatively minor role of recitative-style declamation, while the oboe carries the main melody, supported by solos from the flute, cello, bassoon, and horn. There is also accompaniment from the strings (playing in triplets) and the continuo in the most complex orchestration that Gluck ever wrote.

== Orchestration ==
Gluck made a number of changes to the orchestration of Orfeo when adapting it from the original Italian version to the French version of 1774. Cornetts and chalumeaux are replaced by more common and modern oboes and clarinets, while the part played by trombones considerably decreases, possibly due to a lack of technical ability on the part of the French trombonists. Cornetts were instruments that were typically used for church music, and chalumeaux were predominant only in chamber music: both cornetts and chalumeaux were unpopular in France in 1774. In many ways the change from chalumeau to oboe corresponds to that from castrato to high tenor. Neither castrato nor chalumeau were to survive.

In both the Italian and French version Orfeo's lyre is represented by the harp, and it was this use of the instrument in 1774 that it is usually thought introduced the harp to French orchestras. Each verse of the strophic "Chiamo il mio ben cosi" is accompanied by different solo instruments. In Vienna these were flute, horns, and English horns, but in 1774 Gluck was required to change this orchestration to that of a single horn and two clarinets, again replacing uncommon instruments with those in far more widespread usage. During the aria "Chiamo il mio ben cosi" and the interspersing recitatives Gluck added another offstage orchestra consisting of strings and chalumeaux, in order to provide an echo effect.

== Scores and librettos ==
For the original 1762 Italian version, Orfeo ed Euridice, azione teatrale in three acts, the libretto was published by van Ghelen (Vienna, 1762) and the full score by Duchesne (Paris, 1764). Many 18th-century manuscript copies of the full score may be found in libraries, including the Gesellschaft der Musikfreunde in Vienna, the Austrian National Library in Vienna, the Bibliothèque nationale de France (BNF) in Paris, the Bibliothèque-Musée de l'Opéra National de Paris, and the British Library in London. A critical edition, edited by Anna Amalie Abert and Ludwig Finscher, was published in 1963 as part of Bärenreiter's Sämtliche Werke ("Complete Works").

For the 1774 French version, Orphée et Eurydice, tragédie opéra in three acts, the libretto was published by Delormel (Paris, 1774) and the full score by Lemarchand (Paris, 1774). A critical edition, edited by musicologist Ludwig Finscher, was published in 1967 as part of Bärenreiter's Sämtliche Werke. Substantial fragments of autograph scores are in the Bibliothèque Nationale in Paris and the Bibliothèque-Musée de l'Opéra in Paris.

== Recordings ==
There have been numerous recordings of the different versions, especially of the Berlioz adaptation featuring a female Orfeo. The British contralto Kathleen Ferrier and American mezzo-soprano Marilyn Horne were especially notable interpreters. In recent years, recordings and stage productions of the Vienna version of the opera have featured countertenors in the role of Orpheus. Countertenors Derek Lee Ragin, Jochen Kowalski, René Jacobs, James Bowman, and Michael Chance have recorded Orfeo ed Euridice. The role of Orfeo has also been performed and recorded by tenors and even baritones such as Dietrich Fischer-Dieskau, who has made three recordings of the role. Until recent times, most recordings of all versions were cut or altered in some way.

Recordings of the French version for tenor are still relatively rare due to a lack of genuine haute-contres: there is one from the mid-1950s starring Léopold Simoneau opposite his wife Pierrette Alarie, and Nicolai Gedda also recorded the role in 1955. (Simoneau's version has been available on CD, although not at present, but Gedda's recording had its premiere CD release in 2009.) In 2002 haute-contre Jean-Paul Fouchécourt added his version, while Marc Minkowski brought out a period instrument performance with Richard Croft in the title role in 2004. In April 2010, a concert performance recorded in Madrid two years earlier by tenore di grazia Juan Diego Flórez, was finally released. There is also a DVD of the 1993 Australian Opera production, directed by Stefanos Lazaridis, with Australian haute-contre David Hobson as Orphée.

In 2018 Erato released a recording using the score as performed in Italian at the Teatro San Carlo in Naples in 1774. The theatre had adapted the score to include additions by Johann Christian Bach and variations for soprano coloratura. In this recording Philippe Jaroussky sings Orfeo and Amanda Forsythe is Euridice.

In 2022, Brooklyn Telemann Chamber Society released a film version with cinematography by Matthew Kyle Levine, using an amalgamation of the 1774 Naples score and others with text from Dante Alighieri's Inferno. In this feature-length film, soprano Alexandra Pawlus plays the title role transcribed for her voice, with Helena Waterous as Euridice and Allegra Durante as Amore. Additional characters Hades and Persephone (played by director Liz Kiger) and Cerberus add to the dramatic tension of the film.
