= Louis Anseaume =

French playwright and librettist (1721–1784)

Louis Anseaume (French pronunciation: [lwi ɑ̃som]; 1721 – 7 July 1784) was a French playwright and librettist from Paris.

He contributed the words for operas by André Ernest Modeste Grétry, Pierre-Alexandre Monsigny, Egidio Romualdo Duni, Christoph Willibald Gluck, and François-André Danican Philidor. He is credited with developing the genre of comédie mêlée d'ariettes ('comedy mixed with ariettes'), a type of opéra comique.

A prompter and répétiteur at Comédie Italienne, he was deputy director of the Opéra-Comique and wrote some forty plays, often in collaboration with Charles-Simon Favart, including several opéras-comiques with Duni:

- Le Chinois poli en France (1754)
- Le Peintre amoureux de son modèle (1757), music by Duni
- La Fausse Esclave (1758), music by Gluck
- Cendrillon (1759), music by Laruette
- L'Île des fous (1760), music by Duni
- Mazet (1761), music by Duni
- Le Milicien (1762), music by Duni
- Les Deux Chasseurs et la Laitière (1763), music by Duni
- La Clochette (1766), music by Duni
- Le tableau parlant (1769), music by Grétry

He was one of the founders of the French opéra comique genre.

== Sources ==
- The Oxford Dictionary of Opera, by John Warrack and Ewan West (1992), ISBN 0-19-869164-5.
