= Comédie mêlée d'ariettes =

Opera genre

The French term comédie mêlée d'ariettes (French pronunciation: [kɔmedi mɛle daʁjɛt], 'comedy mixed with little songs') was frequently used during the late ancien régime for certain types of opéra comique (French opera with spoken dialogue).

The term became popular in the mid 18th century following the Querelle des Bouffons, a dispute over the respective merits of French serious opera and Italian opera buffa. At first it was applied to works which parodied Italian opera buffa, in the sense that the words were changed but not the music. One of the earliest examples is the librettist Charles-Simon Favart's Le caprice amoureux, ou Ninette à la cour (1755), which was a parody of Carlo Goldoni's Bertoldo, Bertoldino e Cacasenno (1748), a pasticcio with music by Vincenzo Ciampi and others (first performed in Paris in 1753 as Bertoldo in corte). Another common term for such parodies was opéra bouffon.

Soon, however, the term comédie mêlée d'ariettes came to be used for works with newly composed music, in contrast to the comédies en vaudevilles, which used tunes from popular songs with altered words. (In the 18th century, the term opéra comique was conventionally applied to the latter.) The first French opéra comique with both original music and spoken dialogue, although not labeled as such, was Egidio Duni's Le peintre amoureux de son modèle (1757). The director of the Opéra-Comique company, Jean Monnet, feared that a work by an unknown foreign composer would not be successful, so he advertised it as a parody of an Italian intermezzo, Il pittore innamorato. This new form of French comic opera is particularly associated with the work of its librettist Louis Anseaume. The Oxford Dictionary of Music lists other examples of the form: Christoph Willibald Gluck's La rencontre imprévue (1764), François-André Danican Philidor's Tom Jones (1765), Pierre-Alexandre Monsigny's Le déserteur (1769), and André Ernest Modeste Grétry's Zémire et Azor (1771).

== See also ==
- Category:Comédies mêlées d'ariettes

== Sources ==
- Bartlet, M. Elizabeth C. (1992). "Comédie mêlée d'ariettes" in Sadie 1992, vol. 1, p. 910.
- Cook, Elizabeth (1992a). "Anseaume, Louis" in Sadie 1992, vol. 1, p. 144.
- Cook, Elizabeth (1992b). "Peintre amoureux de son modèle, Le" in Sadie 1992, vol. 3, p. 932.
- Libby, Dennis; Willaert, Saskia; Jackman, James L. [work-list] (1992). "Ciampi, Vincenzo (Legrenzio)" in Sadie 1992, vol. 1, pp. 858–859.
- Loewenberg, Alfred (1978). Annals of Opera 1597–1940 (third edition, revised). Totowa, New Jersey: Rowman and Littlefield. ISBN 9780874718515.
- Sadie, Stanley, editor (1992). The New Grove Dictionary of Opera (4 volumes). London: Macmillan. ISBN 9781561592289.
- Sonneck, Oscar G. (1911). "Ciampi's Bertoldo, Bertoldino e Cacasenno and Favart's Ninette à la cour: A Contribution to the History of Pasticcio (Sämmelbände der I. M. G., 1911)", pp. 111–179, in Miscellaneous Studies in the History of Music, edited by O. G. Sonneck. New York: Macmillan, 1921.
- Warrack, John; West, Ewan (1992). The Oxford Dictionary of Opera. Oxford/New York: Oxford University Press. ISBN 9780198691648.
- Wild, Nicole; Charlton, David (2005). Théâtre de l'Opéra-Comique Paris: répertoire 1762-1972. Sprimont, Belgium: Editions Mardaga. ISBN 9782870098981.
