= Egidio Duni =

Italian composer

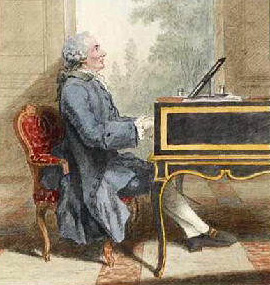
Egidio Duni at the harpsichord, circa 1760

Egidio Romualdo Duni (or Egide Romuald Duny; 11 February 1708 – 11 June 1775) was an Italian composer who studied in Naples and worked in Italy, France and London, writing both Italian and French operas.

== Biography ==
Born in Matera, Duni was taught music by his father, Francesco Duni, and two sisters. At the age of nine, he was accepted at the Conservatorio di Santa Maria di Loreto, near Naples. There he worked with Giovanni Battista Pergolesi, Giovanni Paisiello, and other masters of Italian opera.

His first success was with the opera Nerone presented at the Rome Carnival in 1735. Thereafter, he was in London (Demofoonte, 1737), returning to Italy, where he eventually became maestro di cappella in Parma in 1749.

The latter part of his career was spent in France, where he played a key role in the development of the comédie mêlée d'ariettes (an early form of opéra comique), with such works as Le peintre amoureux de son modèle (Paris, 1757), La fée Urgèle (Fontainebleau, 1765), and L'école de la jeunesse (Paris, 1765).

He died in Paris.

== Works ==
=== Italian operas ===
- Nerone (Rome, 1735)
- Adriano in Siria on a libretto by Metastasio (1735–1736)
- Giuseppe riconosciuto (1736)
- La tirannide debellata (1736)
- Demofoonte (London, 1737)
- Didone abbandonata (1739)
- Catone in Utica on a libretto by Metastasio (1740)
- Bajazet (1743)
- Artaserse (1744)
- Ipermestra (1748)
- Ciro riconosciuto (1748)
- L'Olimpiade (Parma, 1755)
- La buona figliuola (Parma, 1756)
- Alessandro nelle Indie on a libretto
- Adriano
- Demetrio

=== French operas ===
- Ninette à la cour, Parma (1755)
- La chercheuse d'esprit, Paris (1756)
- Le peintre amoureux de son modèle, Paris (1757)
- Le docteur Sangrado, Saint Germain (1758)
- La fille mal gardée, Paris (1758)
- La veuve indécise, Paris (1759)
- L’isle de foux, Paris (1760)
- Nina et Lindor (1761)
- Mazet, Paris (1761)
- La bonne fille, Paris (1762)
- Le retour au village, Paris (1762)
- La plaidreuse et le procés, Paris (1763)
- Le milicien, Versailles (1763)
- Les deux chasseurs et la laitière (1763)
- Le rendez-vous, Paris (1763)
- L'école de la jeunesse, Paris (1765)
- La fée Urgèle, Fontainebleau (1765)
- La clochette, Paris (1766)
- Les moissonneurs, Paris (1768)
- Les sabots, Paris (1768)
- Themire, Fontainebleau (1770)

== Sources ==
- Warrack, John and West, Ewan (1992), The Oxford Dictionary of Opera, 782 pages, ISBN 0-19-869164-5
- Paone, Gregorio Maria (2018), Egidio Romualdo Duni tra la produzione parmigiana e quella francese: 1749-1763, 160 pages, ISBN 978-8833810133
