= Antoine Dauvergne =

French composer and violinist (1713–1797)

Antoine Dauvergne (3 October 1713 – 11 February 1797) was a French composer and violinist.

Dauvergne was born in Moulins, Allier. He served as master of the Chambre du roi, director of the Concert Spirituel from 1762 to 1771, and director of the Opéra three times between 1769 and 1790. Dauvergne contributed both as a performer and composer to the classical music at the court at Versailles. He is most famous as the composer of Les troqueurs, a work which had a major influence on the development of French opéra comique. He died, aged 83, in Lyon.

In addition to operas and opera-ballets, Dauvergne composed a number of other works including violin sonatas (1739), trio sonatas, motets, and what he called Concerts de Simphonies (1751).

The name Dauvergne is sometimes written D'Auvergne. It means "from Auvergne," the region in the center of France covered by the volcanic Massif Central mountain range.

== List of works ==
=== Operas and ballets ===
- Les amours de Tempé, ballet héroïque (1752, Paris)
- Les troqueurs, intermède (1753, Paris)
- La coquette trompée, comédie lyrique (1753, Fontainebleau)
- La sibylle, ballet (1753, Fontainebleau)
- Énée et Lavinie, tragédie lyrique (1758, Paris)
- Les fêtes d'Euterpe, opéra-ballet (1758, Paris)
- Le rival favorable, additional entrée for Les fêtes d'Euterpe (1760, Paris)
- Canente, tragédie (1760, Paris)
- Hercule mourant, tragédie lyrique (1761, Paris)
- Alphée et Aréthuse, ballet (1762, Paris)
- Polixène, tragédie lyrique (1763, Paris)
- Le triomphe de flore, ou Le retour de printemps, ballet-héroïque (1765, Fontainebleau)
- La vénitienne, comédie-ballet (1768, Paris)
- La tour enchantée, ballet figuré (1770, Paris)
- Le prix de la valeur, ballet héroïque (1771, Paris)
- La sicilien, ou L'amour peintre, comédie-ballet (1780, Versailles)
- La mort d'Orphée, tragédie (unperformed)
- Sémiramis, tragédie (unperformed)

== Discography ==
- Musique à Versailles - Dauvergne: Concerts de Simphonies. Performed by the Concerto Köln (Virgin Classics 1999, Virgin Veritas – 7243 5 61542 2 3).
- Antoine Dauvergne: Les Troqueurs - Opera Bouffon. Cappella Coloniensis, conducted by William Christie (Harmonia mundi 1994, HMC 901454).

== Sources ==
- "Article on Dauvergne (in French) in Goldberg Magazine". Archived from the original on 2006-01-18.
- List of Dauvergne's staged works with comments (in German)
- List of Dauvergne's staged works with comments (in French)
