= Joseph-Nicolas Lefroid de Méreaux =

French composer

Joseph-Nicolas Lefroid de Méreaux (22 June 1767 – 6 February 1838) was a French composer born in Paris and composed works for piano and organ – among his piano works, also sonatas. He was the son of Nicolas-Jean Lefroid de Méreaux and father of Jean-Amédée Lefroid de Méreaux.

== Career ==
Throughout his life, Joseph-Nicolas was not particularly known as a composer, but rather as a keyboard player, and mostly composed for the piano. He played organ at Champ de Mars, where the famous Fête de la Fédération on 14 July 1790 was held. Afterwards, he became professor at the L'école royale de chant of the Conservatoire de Paris, which grew attached to the many likings of King Louis XVI at the time. Since then, he was employed as organist and pianist at the Protestant temple of the Oratoire du Louvre in Paris despite being a Catholic.

Joseph-Nicolas married Marie Angélique-Félicité Blondel (1774–1840) on 17 August 1801 in Paris and – only for the crowning of Napoleon Bonaparte – composed a cantata with orchestra three years later, which was performed in the temple of the very Paris oratory he worked at.

His marriage brought along not only Amédée Méreaux, but also Louise-Eugénie Lefroid de Méreaux (1808–1892). Joseph-Nicolas left an unfinished manuscript of “Grand methods for piano” behind and taught many distinguished students.

He died on the 6th February 1838 in Paris.

== Note ==
The name is always confused with Jean-Nicolas, which is wrong.
