= Le peintre amoureux de son modèle =

Opéra comique in two acts by Egidio Duni

- Opéra comique by Egidio Duni
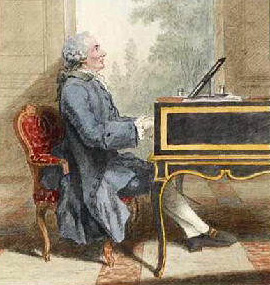
- The composer, by Carmontelle c. 1760
- Translation: The Painter in Love with his Model
- Librettist: Louis Anseaume
- Language: French
- Premiere: 26 July 1757; Théâtre de la Foire Saint-Laurent, Paris

Le peintre amoureux de son modèle (French pronunciation: [lə pɛ̃tʁ amuʁø də sɔ̃ mɔdɛl], The Painter in Love with his Model) is an opéra comique in two acts by the composer Egidio Duni with a libretto by Louis Anseaume. It was first performed at the Théâtre de la Foire Saint-Laurent in Paris on 26 July 1757. The Italian Duni had been working at the court of Parma, where French culture was highly fashionable, and travelled to Paris to see the premiere of his opera. He remained in France for the rest of his career. Le peintre marked an important stage in the development of opéra comique, since its musical numbers were almost entirely original music, whereas previous opéras comiques employed either popular vaudevilles or ariettes appropriated from other works.

The melody of "Maudit Amour, raison sévère", one of the opera's ariettes, was used by Sweden's bard, Carl Michael Bellman, for his song "Glimmande nymf", one of his Fredman's Epistles published in 1790.

== Roles ==
Roles, voice types, premiere cast
Cast	Voice type	Premiere cast, 26 July 1757
Alberti, an elderly painter	bass	Jean-Louis Laruette
Zerbin, a young apprentice	tenor	M Bouret
Jacinte, an old governess	soprano	Mlle Deschamps
Laurette, a young girl	soprano	Mlle Rosaline
