= Canente (Dauvergne) =

Opera by Antoine Dauvergne

Canente (English: Canens) is an opera by the French composer Antoine Dauvergne, first performed at the Académie Royale de Musique (the Paris Opéra) on 11 November 1760. It takes the form of a tragédie lyrique in five acts. It was Dauvergne's second work in the genre, following Énée et Lavinie (1758). Canente enjoyed 22 performances between its premiere and 11 January 1761.

The text is a revision, by Bay de Cury, of a libretto by Antoine Houdar de la Motte, which was originally set by Pascal Collasse in 1700.

== Roles ==
Cast	Voice type	Premiere
Circé (Circe), enchantress and daughter of the Sun	soprano	Marie-Jeanne Fesch, called Chevalier
Tiber	basse-taille (bass-baritone)	Nicolas Gélin
Picus, the first king of Italy	haute-contre	Jean-Pierre Pillot
Canente (Canens), a nymph	soprano	Marie-Jeanne Larrivée Lemière
Saturne (Saturn)	basse-taille	Philippe-Thomas Desentis
Nérine, Circe's confidante	soprano	Rozet
La Nuit (Night)	soprano	Dubois
L'Amour (Cupid)	soprano	Villette
Une bergère (a shepherdess)	soprano	Villette
Une fleuve (a river, follower of Tiber)	basse-taille	Philippe-Thomas Desentis
The Furies: Alecton (Alecto), Erinnis, Mégere (Megaera)	2 basses-tailles 1 haute-contre	Jaubert, Desentis, Muguet
Chorus: Saturn's followers, representing the four ages, divinities of the waters, followers of Tiber; magicians and ministers of Circe; Games, Pleasures and Graces, followers of Cupid; peoples.

== Synopsis ==
The enchantress Circe has helped Picus become King of Latium because she is in love with him. But Picus is in love with the nymph Canens. However, the River Tiber is also in love with Canens and threatens to flood Latium if she marries Picus. Circe abducts the nymph and orders her demons to torment Canens, but she manages to win them over and is rescued by a group of Cupids. Circe tells Picus that Canens is going to marry Tiber, but all her magic cannot alter his love for the nymph. Circe resorts to revenge and sends the Furies to destroy the wedding of Picus and Canens. But the Furies are thwarted by Cupid, Circe admits defeat and the lovers are finally married.

== Sources ==
- David Charlton Opera in the Age of Rousseau: Music, Confrontation, Realism, Cambridge University Press, 2012.
- Félix Clément and Pierre Larousse Dictionnaire des Opéras, Paris, 1881.
- (in French) Benoït Dratwicki, Antoine Dauvergne (1713—1797): une carrière tourmentée dans la France musicale des Lumières, Editions Mardaga, 2011.
