= Jean Monnet (director) =

French writer and theatre impresario

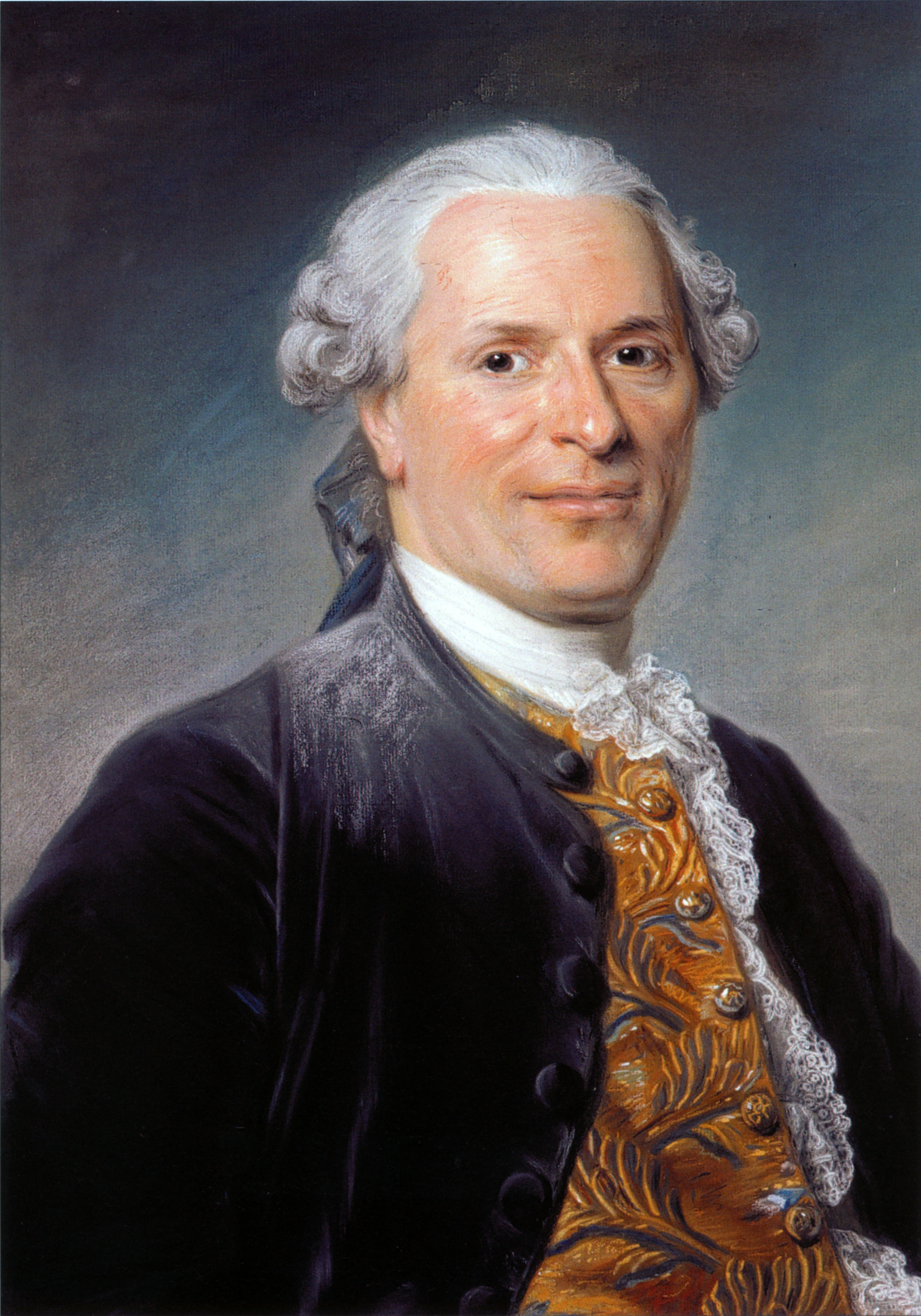
Jean Monnet in 1756 by Maurice Quentin de La Tour

Jean Monnet (French pronunciation: [ʒɑ̃ mɔnɛ]; Condrieu, Rhône 7 September 1703 – Paris, 1785) was a French theatre impresario and writer.

== Life ==
A baker's son, he was orphaned at age 8 and taken in by his uncle before moving into the service of the Duchesse de Berry at age 15. He was the director of the Opéra-Comique at the Foire Saint-Laurent from 1743 to 1745 and from 1751 to 1757.

== Works ==
- Supplément au Roman comique, ou Mémoires pour servir à la vie de Jean Monnet, ci-devant Directeur de l'Opéra-Comique à Paris, de l'Opéra de Lyon, & d'une Comédie Françoise à Londres, London, 1772, 2 vol. These were his memoirs, which are very instructive on 18th century theatre life. It was republished by Henri d'Alméras with an introduction and notes in 1908.
- Les Soupers de Daphné et les dortoirs de Lacédémone, novel, Oxford (Paris), 1740
- Le Chirurgien anglais, 'comédie-parade', with Charles Collé, 1748
- Anthologie françoise, ou Chansons choisies, depuis le 13e siècle jusqu'à présent, Paris, 1765.
