= Opéra comique =

Genre of French opera

Opéra comique (French: [ɔpeʁa kɔmik]; plural: opéras comiques) is a genre of French opera that contains spoken dialogue and arias. It emerged from the popular opéras comiques en vaudevilles of the Fair Theatres of St Germain and St Laurent (and to a lesser extent the Comédie-Italienne), which combined existing popular tunes with spoken sections. Associated with the Paris theatre of the same name, opéra comique is not necessarily comical or shallow; Carmen, perhaps the most famous opéra comique, is a tragedy.

== Use of the term ==
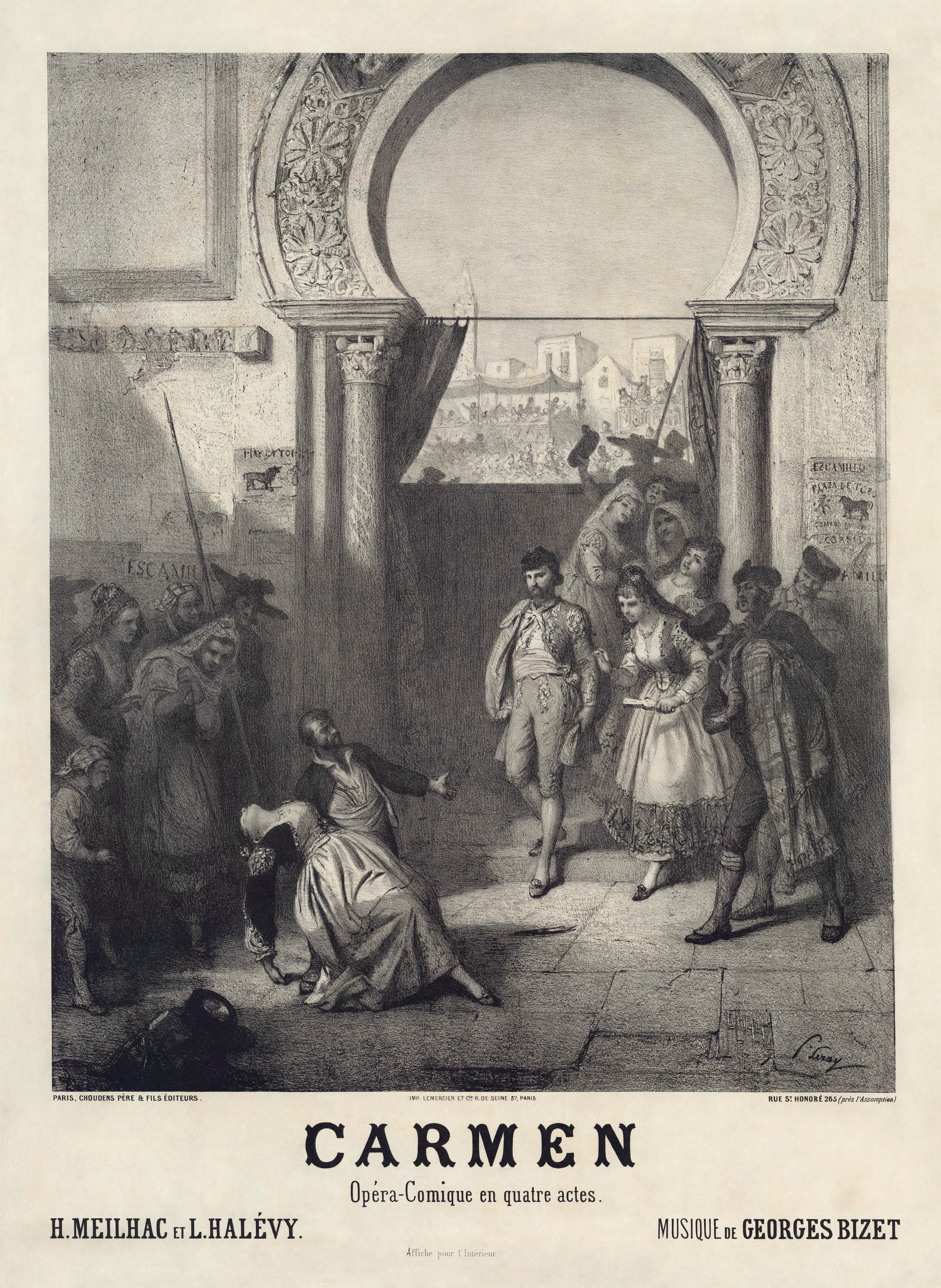
Poster for Carmen, probably the most famous opéra comique

The term opéra comique is complex in meaning and cannot simply be translated as "comic opera". The genre originated in the early 18th century with humorous and satirical plays performed at the theatres of the Paris fairs which contained songs (vaudevilles), with new words set to already existing music. The phrase opéra comique en vaudevilles or similar was often applied to these early-stage works. In the middle of the 18th century, composers began to write original music to replace the vaudevilles, under the influence of the lighter types of Italian opera (especially Giovanni Battista Pergolesi's La serva padrona). This form of opéra comique was often known as comédie mêlée d'ariettes, but the range of subject matter it covered expanded beyond the merely comic. By the 19th century, opéra comique often meant little more than works with spoken dialogue performed at the Opéra-Comique theatre, as opposed to works with recitative delivery which appeared at the Paris Opéra. Thus, probably the most famous of all opéras comiques, Georges Bizet's Carmen, is on a tragic subject. As Elizabeth Bartlet and Richard Langham Smith note in their Grove article on the subject, composers and librettists frequently rejected the use of the umbrella term opéra comique in favor of more precise labels.

== History ==
=== Beginnings ===
Opéra comique began in the early eighteenth century in the theatres of the two annual Paris fairs, the Foire Saint Germain and the Foire Saint Laurent. Here plays began to include musical numbers called vaudevilles, which were existing popular tunes refitted with new words. The plays were humorous and often contained satirical attacks on the official theatres such as the Comédie-Française. In 1715 the two fair theatres were brought under the aegis of an institution called the Théâtre de l'Opéra-Comique. In spite of fierce opposition from rival theatres the venture flourished and leading playwrights of the time, including Alain-René Lesage and Alexis Piron, contributed works in the new form.

=== Late 18th century ===
The Querelle des Bouffons (1752–54), a quarrel between advocates of French and Italian music, was a major turning-point for opéra comique. Members of the pro-Italian faction, such as the philosopher and musician Jean-Jacques Rousseau, attacked serious French opera, represented by the tragédies en musique of Jean-Philippe Rameau, in favor of what they saw as the simplicity and "naturalness" of Italian comic opera (opera buffa), exemplified by Pergolesi's La serva padrona, which had recently been performed in Paris by a traveling Italian troupe. In 1752, Rousseau produced a short opera influenced by Pergolesi, Le Devin du village, in an attempt to introduce his ideas of musical simplicity and naturalness to France. Its success attracted the attention of the Foire theatres. The next year, the head of the Saint Laurent theatre, Jean Monnet, commissioned the composer Antoine Dauvergne to produce a French opera in the style of La serva padrona. The result was Les troqueurs, which Monnet passed off as the work of an Italian composer living in Vienna who was fluent in French, thus fooling the partisans of Italian music into giving it a warm welcome. Dauvergne's opera, with a simple plot, everyday characters, and Italianate melodies, had a huge influence on subsequent opéra comique, setting a fashion for composing new music, rather than recycling old tunes. Where it differed from later opéras comiques, however, was that it contained no spoken dialogue. In this, Dauvergne was following the example of Pergolesi's La serva padrona.

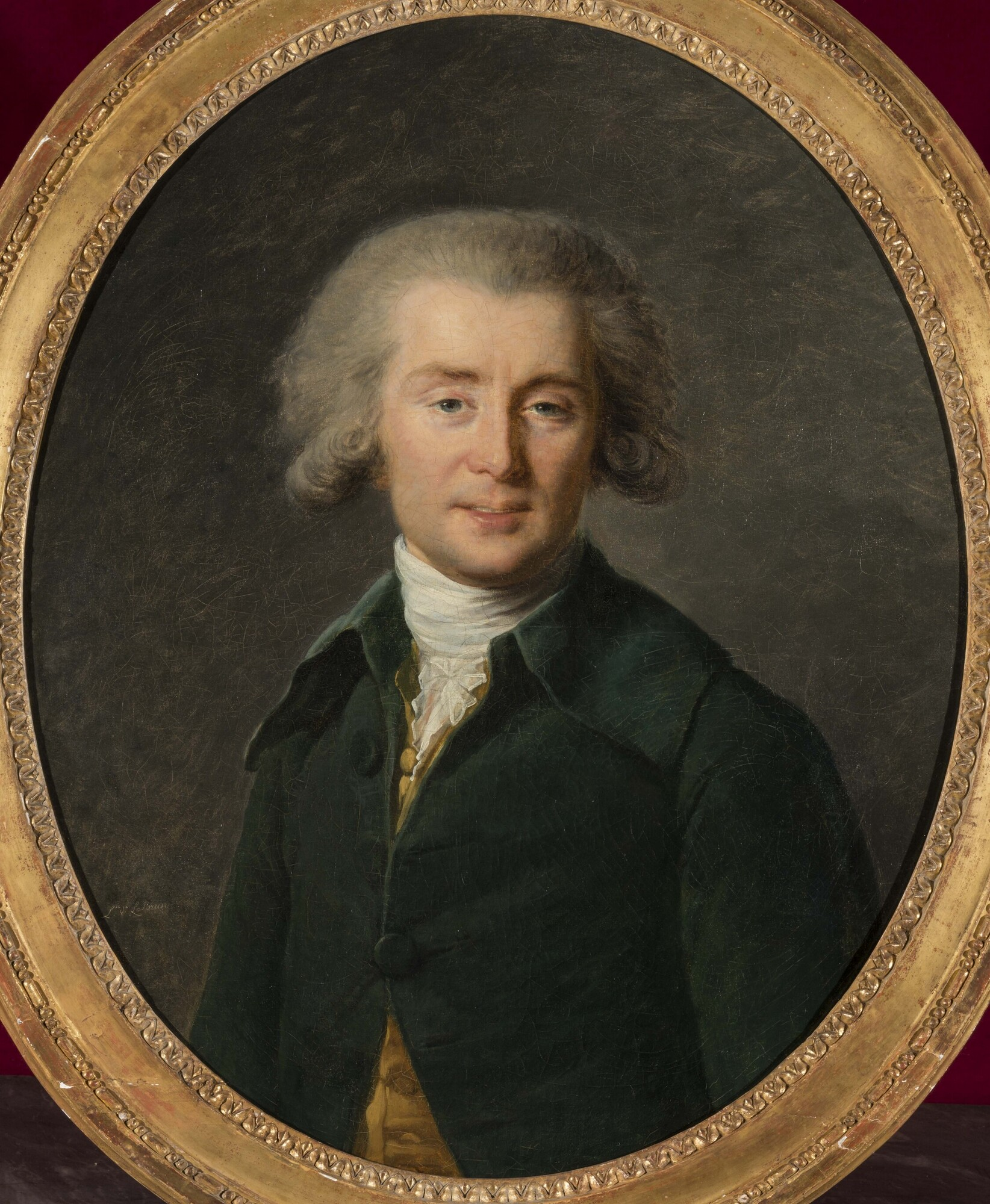
André Grétry, the most famous composer of opéra comique before the French Revolution

The short, catchy melodies which replaced the vaudevilles were known as ariettes and many opéras comiques in the late 18th century were styled comédies mêlées d'ariettes. Their librettists were often playwrights, skilled at keeping up with the latest trends in the theatre. Louis Anseaume, Michel-Jean Sedaine and Charles Simon Favart were among the most famous of these dramatists. Notable composers of opéras comiques in the 1750s and 1760s include Egidio Duni, Pierre-Alexandre Monsigny and François-André Danican Philidor. Duni, an Italian working at the francophile court of Parma, composed Le peintre amoureux de son modèle in 1757 with a libretto by Anseaume. Its success encouraged the composer to move to Paris permanently and he wrote 20 or so more works for the French stage. Monsigny collaborated with Sedaine in works which mixed comedy with a serious social and political element. Le roi et le fermier (1762) contains Enlightenment themes such as the virtues of the common people and the need for liberty and equality. Their biggest success, Le déserteur (1769), concerns the story of a soldier who has been condemned to death for deserting the army. Philidor's most famous opéra comique was Tom Jones (1765), based on Henry Fielding's 1749 novel of the same name. It is notable for its realistic characters and its many ensembles.

The most important and popular composer of opéra comique in the late 18th century was André Grétry. Grétry successfully blended Italian tunefulness with a careful setting of the French language. He was a versatile composer who expanded the range of opéra comique to cover a wide variety of subjects from the Oriental fairy tale Zémire et Azor (1772) to the musical satire of Le jugement de Midas (1778) and the domestic farce of L'amant jaloux (also 1778). His most famous work was the historical "rescue opera", Richard Coeur-de-lion (1784), which achieved international popularity, reaching London in 1786 and Boston in 1797.

Between 1724 and 1762 the Opéra-Comique theatre was located at the Foire Saint Germain. In 1762 the company was merged with the Comédie-Italienne and moved to the Hôtel de Bourgogne. In 1783 a new, larger home was created for it at the Théâtre Italien (later renamed the Salle Favart).

=== Revolution and the 19th century ===
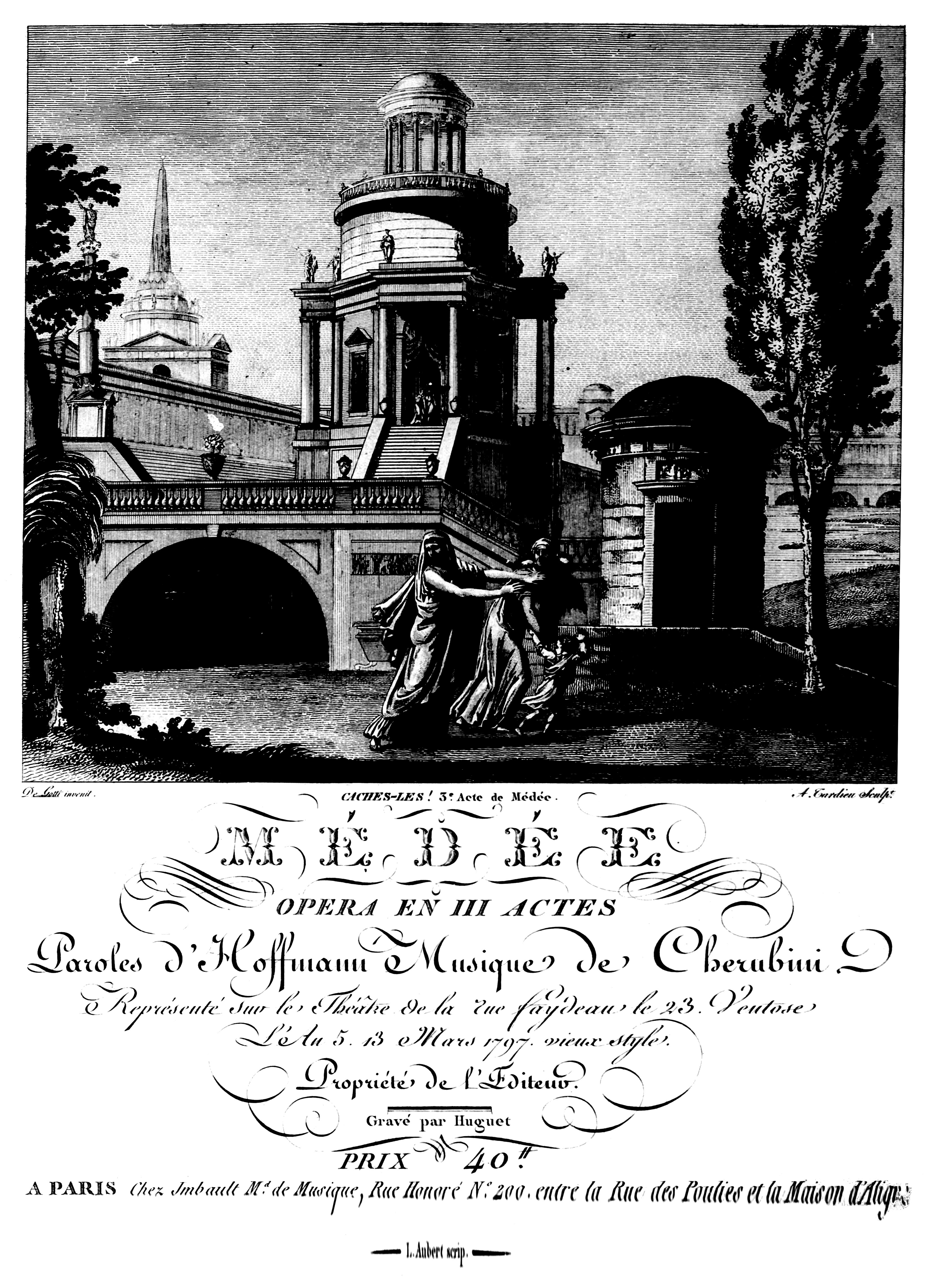
Title page of the first edition of the full score of Médée by Cherubini, 1797

The French Revolution brought many changes to musical life in Paris. In 1793, the name of the Comédie-Italienne was changed to the Opéra-Comique, but it no longer had a monopoly on performing operas with spoken dialogue and faced serious rivalry from the Théâtre Feydeau, which also produced works in the opéra comique style. Opéra comique generally became more dramatic and less comic and began to show the influence of musical Romanticism. The chief composers at the Opéra-Comique during the Revolutionary era were Étienne Méhul, Nicolas Dalayrac, Rodolphe Kreutzer and Henri-Montan Berton. Those at the Feydeau included Luigi Cherubini, Pierre Gaveaux, Jean-François Le Sueur and François Devienne. The works of Méhul (for example Stratonice, 1792; Ariodant, 1799), Cherubini (Lodoïska, 1791; Médée, 1797; Les Deux journées, 1800) and Le Sueur (La caverne, 1793) in particular show the influence of serious French opera, especially Gluck, and a willingness to take on previously taboo subjects (e.g. incest in Méhul's Mélidore et Phrosine, 1794; infanticide in Cherubini's famous Médée). Orchestration and harmony are more complex than in the music of the previous generation; attempts are made to reduce the amount of spoken dialogue, and unity is provided by techniques such as the "reminiscence motif" (recurring musical themes representing a character or idea).

In 1801 the Opéra-Comique and the Feydeau merged for financial reasons. The changing political climate – more stable under the rule of Napoleon – was reflected in musical fashion as comedy began to creep back into opéra-comique. The lighter new offerings of Boieldieu (such as Le calife de Bagdad, 1800) and Isouard (Cendrillon, 1810) were a great success. Parisian audiences of the time also loved Italian opera, visiting the Théâtre Italien to see opera buffa and works in the newly fashionable bel canto style, especially those by Rossini, whose fame was sweeping across Europe. Rossini's influence began to pervade French opéra comique. Its presence is felt in Boieldieu's greatest success, La dame blanche (1825) as well as later works by Auber (Fra Diavolo, 1830; Le domino noir, 1837), Ferdinand Hérold (Zampa, 1831), and Adolphe Adam (Le postillon de Lonjumeau, 1836).

== See also ==
- Musical theatre
