= List of stage works by Eugène Scribe =

Scribe by Nadar

This is a list of known stage works by the playwright and librettist Eugène Scribe. He used many pen-names, and contributed anonymously to various works, and it is not known how many works are omitted from the published lists. Estimates differ considerably of the number of stage works he wrote or co-wrote: the published edition of his known works runs to 76 volumes, but it is inevitably incomplete, because of his practice of writing pseudonymously or anonymously. His total output of stage works is variously reckoned as between 300 and nearly 500. They include more than 120 librettos for 48 composers, collaborations in musical and non-musical theatre with more than 60 co-authors, and over 130 stage works written solo. The information below is from the Grand dictionnaire universel du XIXe siècle, edited by Pierre Larousse, and Grove's Dictionary of Music and Musicians. Scribe wrote some novels, which made little impression and are not listed here.

== List of stage works ==
Year	Title	Genre	Co-authors	Composers	Notes
1810	Le Prétendu sans le savoir, ou L'Occasion fuit le larron	vaudeville (Note: The vaudeville, a genre that originated in the middle ages as a satirical song, had evolved by the early 19th century into a play in verse with music, often popular songs borrowed for the purpose. By the middle of the century it had split into two branches: opérettes, such as those by Offenbach, and, in the words of the writer Peter Meyer, "the vaudeville itself ... akin to what we would call slapstick farce, where movement was more important than character".)			under the pen-name Antoine
1811	Les Dervis	vaudeville	Germain Delavigne		
1812	L'Auberge, ou Les brigands sans le savoir	vaudeville	Delestre-Poirson		
1813	Le Chambre à coucher, ou Une demi-heure de Richelieu	opéra-comique		Luc Guénée	
1813	Koulikan, ou Les Tartares	mélodrame	Henri Dupin		under the pen name Saint-Mare
1813	Thibault, comte de Champagne	vaudeville	Delavigne		
1814	Barbanera, ou La Nuit des noces	folie-vaudeville	Dupin		
1814	Thomas le chauceux, ou Les trois bossus	vaudeville			
1815	Le Bachelier de Salamanque	vaudeville	Dupin, Delavigne		
1815	La Perruque et la redingote	opéra-comique		Rodolphe Kreutzer, Charles-Frédéric Kreubé	
1815	La Mort et le Bûcheron	vaudeville	Dupin		
1815	Le Gascon, ou Le Pompe funèbre	vaudeville	Dupin		
1815	Une nuit de la garde nationale	vaudeville	Delestre-Poirson		
1815	Paolo, ou Les amoureux sans le savoir	comédie	Dupin		under the pen name Deschamps
1815	Encore une nuit de la garde nationale, ou Le poste de la barrière	vaudeville	Delestre-Poirson		
1816	La Comtesse de Troun	opéra-comique		Guénée	
1816	Flore et Zéphire	vaudeville	Delestre-Poirson		
1816	Le Valet de son rival	comédie	Delavigne		
1816	Hamlet de M. le public	pantomime tragique	Delestre-Poirson		
1816	Farinelli, ou La Pièce de circonstance	vaudeville	Dupin		
1816	Tivoli, aujourd'hui fête extraordinaire	vaudeville	Charles Moreau, Delestre-Poirson		
1816	Gusman d'Alfrarache	vaudeville	Dupin		
1816	Les Montagnes russes	vaudeville	Delestre-Poirson		
1816	La Jarretière de la mariée	vaudeville	Dupin		
1816	Le Comte Ory	vaudeville	Delestre-Poirson		
1816	Une nuit d'Ispahan	comédie	Delestre-Poirson		
1816	La Princesse de Tarare, ou Les contes de la Mère l'Oie	vaudeville	Dupin, Delestre-Poirson		
1817	Encore un Pourceaugnac	vaudeville	Delestre-Poirson		
1817	Le Solliciteur	vaudeville	Eugène Imbert, Antoine-François Varner		
1817	Wallace, ou La Barrière Mont-Parnasse	vaudeville	M. A. Désaugiers, Delestre-Poirson		
1817	Les Deux Précepteurs	vaudeville	Mélesville		
1817	Le Combat des montagnes	vaudeville	Dupin		
1817	Le Café des Variétés	vaudeville	Dupin		
1817	Tous les vaudevilles	vaudeville	M. A. Désaugiers, Delestre-Poirson		
1817	Le Petit Dragon	vaudeville	Delestre-Poirson, Mélesville		
1817	Les Comices d'Athènes	vaudeville	Varner		
1817	La Princesse de Tarare	vaudeville			
1817	Les Nouvelles Danaîdes	vaudeville			
1817	L'Homme vert	vaudeville	Delestre-Poirson, Mélesville		
1818	Carnaval de Cocagne	vaudeville	Imbert, Varner		
1818	Chactas et Atala	drame			
1818	Les Dehors trompeurs	vaudeville	Delestre-Poirson, Mélesville		
1818	La Fête du mari	vaudeville			
1818	Une visite à Bedlam	vaudeville	Delestre-Poirson,		
1818	Les Vélocipèdes	vaudeville	Dupin, Varner		
1818	La Volière du frère Philippe	vaudeville	Delestre-Poirson, Mélesville		
1818	La Songe, ou Chapelle de Glenthorn	mélodrame	Mélesville, Delestre-Poirson		
1818	L'École du village	vaudeville	Nicolas Brazier, Théophile Dumersan, Delestre-Poirson		
1818	Le Nouveau Nicaise	vaudeville	Dupin		
1818	L'Hôtel des Quatre Nations	vaudeville	Brazier, Dupin		
1819	Le Fou de Péronne	vaudeville			
1819	Les Deux Maris	vaudeville			
1819	Le Mystificateur	vaudeville	Delestre-Poirson, Alphonse Cerfbeer		
1819	Le Spectre de Grasville	vaudeville	Dupin		
1819	Caroline	vaudeville	Constant Ménissier		
1819	Les Frères invisibles	mélodrame	Delestre-Poirson, Mélesville		
1819	La Pluie d'or	vaudeville	Dupin, Mélesville		
1819	Les Bains à la Papa	vaudeville	Dupin, Varner		
1819	Les Vêpres siciliennes	vaudeville	Mélesville		
1819	La Somnambule	vaudeville	Delavigne		
1820	L'Ennui, ou Le comte Derfort	vaudeville	Dupin, Mélesville		
1820	L'Ours et le Pacha	vaudeville	X. B. Saintine		
1820	Le Spleen	vaudeville	Delestre-Poirson		
1820	Le Diner de garçons	vaudeville	Imbert, Varner		
1820	Le Chat botté	vaudeville	Delestre-Poirson, Mélesville		
1820	Marie Jobard	burlesque	Dupin, Pierre Carmouche		
1820	Le Vampire amoureux	vaudeville	Mélesville		
1820	La Suite du folliculaire	vaudeville	Emmanuel Théaulon, Armand d'Artois, Ferdinand Langlé		under the pen name Raymond
1820	L'Eclipse total	vaudeville	Dupin		under the pen name Nicomède
1820	Le Témoin	vaudeville	Mélesville, Saintine		
1820	Le Déluge, ou Les Petits acteurs	vaudeville	Mélesville, Saintine		
1820	L'Homme noir	vaudeville			under the pen name Felix
1820	Hôtel de bains	vaudeville	Dupin		
1820	Le Beau Narcisse	vaudeville	Saintine, Frédéric de Courcy		under the pen name Clairefontaine
1820	Le Boulevard Bonne-Nouvelle	vaudeville	Moreau, Mélesville		
1820	L'Amour platonique	vaudeville	Mélesville		
1821	Le Secrétaire et le Cuisinier	vaudeville	Mélesville		
1821	Frontin, mari-garçon	vaudeville	Mélesville		
1821	Le Colonel	vaudeville	Delavigne		
1821	L'Intérieur de l'étude	vaudeville	Dupin		
1821	Mon oncle César	vaudeville	Dupin		
1821	Le Gastronome sans argent	vaudeville	Brulay		
1821	Le Parrain	comédie	Delestre-Poirson, Mélesville		
1821	Le Ménage de garçon	vaudeville	Dupin		
1821	La Campagne	vaudeville	Dupin		
1821	La Meunière	opéra-comique	Mélesville	Manuel Garcia	
1821	La Petite Sœur	vaudeville	Mélesville		
1821	Le Mariage enfantin	vaudeville	Delavigne		
1821	Les Petits misères de la vie humaine	vaudeville	Delavigne		
1821	L'Amant bossu	vaudeville	Mélesville, Max Raoul		
1821	L'Artiste	vaudeville			
1821	Michel et Christine	vaudeville	Dupin		
1821	Philibert marié	vaudeville	Moreau		
1821	Le Pagode indienne, ou Les deux génies	vaudeville	Mélesville		
1822	Avis aux goutteux	vaudeville	Vial, Gabriel		
1822	Le Plaisant de société	vaudeville			
1822	Mémoires d'un colonel de hussards	vaudeville	Mélesville		
1822	La Demoiselle et la Dame	vaudeville	Dupin, Courcy		
1822	Le Paradis de Mahomet, ou La pluralite des femmes	opéra-comique	Mélesville	Kreutzer, Kreubé	
1822	La Petite folle	vaudeville	Mélesville		
1822	La Fiancée de Windsor, ou Les indemnites anglaises	vaudeville			
1822	Le Vieux Garçon et la Petite Fille	vaudeville	Delavigne		
1822	Les Nouveau jeux de l'amour et du hasard	vaudeville			revised version of Le Valet de son rival (1816)
1822	Les Eaux du Mont-d'Or	vaudeville	Courcy, Saintine		
1822	La Petite Lampe merveilleuse	opéra-feerie	Mélesville	Alexandre Riccini	
1822	La Veuve du Malabar	vaudeville	Mélesville, Saint-Amand		
1822	La Nouvelle Clary	vaudeville	Dupin		
1822	L'Écarté, ou Un coin de salon	vaudeville	Mélesville, Saint-Georges		
1822	Le Bon Papa, ou Le proposition de mariage	vaudeville	Mélesville		
1822	Les Adieux au public	intermède mèlé			
1822	Valérie	comédie	Mélesville		
1822	L'Enfer dramatique	vaudeville			
1823	La Loge du portier	vaudeville	Édouard-Joseph Mazères		
1823	Leicester, ou Le château de Kenilworth	opéra-comique	Mélesville	Daniel Auber	
1823	L'Intérieur d'un bureau	vaudeville	Imbert, Varner		
1823	Trilby, ou Le Lutin d'Argail	vaudeville	Carmouche		
1823	Le Plan de campagne	vaudeville	Dupin, Mélesville		
1823	Le Menteur véridique	vaudeville	Mélesville		
1823	La Pension bourgeoise	vaudeville	Dupin, Dumersan		
1823	Le Marchand d'amour	vaudeville	Carmouche		
1823	La Maîtresse du logis	vaudeville			under the pen name Cericour
1823	Partie et Revanche	vaudeville	Francis Cornu, Brazier		
1823	Les Assurers dramatiques	comédie	Varner		
1823	L'Avare en goguette	vaudeville	Delavigne		
1823	La Rosière de Rosny	vaudeville			
1823	Stanislas	vaudeville			under the pen name Eugène
1823	Les Grisettes	vaudeville	Dupin		
1823	Le Valet de chambre	opéra-comique		Carafa	revised version of Frontin mari-garcon, (1821)
1823	La Neige, ou Le Nouvel Eginhard	opéra-comique	Delavigne	Auber	
1823	La Vérité dans le vin	vaudeville	Mazères		
1823	Le Retour	vaudeville	Dupin		
1823	Un dernier jour de fortune	vaudeville	Emmanuel Dupaty		
1823	Rodolphe, ou Frère et soeur	drame	Mélesville		
1823	Le Grand diner, ou Rossini à Paris	vaudeville	Mazères		
1823	Une heure à Port-Sainte-Marie	vaudeville			
1823	L'Héritière	vaudeville	Delavigne		
1824	Le Coiffeur et le Perruquier	vaudeville	Mazères, Saint-Laurent		
1824	Le Fondé de pouvoirs	vaudeville	Carmouche		
1824	La Mansarde des artistes	vaudeville	Dupin, Varner		
1824	Les Trois Genres	vaudeville	Dupaty, Pichat		
1824	Le Leicester du faubourg	vaudeville	Saintine, Carmouche		
1824	Le Concert à la cour	opéra-comique	Mélesville	Auber	
1824	Le Baiser au porteur	vaudeville	Justin Gensoul, Courcy		
1824	Le Dîner sur l'herbe	vaudeville	Mélesville		
1824	Les Adieux au comptoir	vaudeville	Mélesville		
1824	Peau d'âne	vaudeville			
1824	Le Château de la Poularde	vaudeville	Dupin, Varner		
1824	Le Bal champêtre	vaudeville	Dupin		
1824	Léocadie	opéra-comique	Mélesville	Auber	
1824	Le Parlementaire	vaudeville	Mélesville, Vibert		
1824	Coraly, ou La Sœur et le Frère	vaudeville	Mélesville		
1824	Monsieur Tardif	vaudeville	Mélesville		
1824	Robin des Bois	opéra fantastique	Thomas Sauvage, Castil-Blaze	Carl Maria von Weber	
1824	La Haine d'une femme	vaudeville			
1825	Vatel, ou le Petit-fils d'un grand homme	vaudeville	Mazères		
1825	La Quarantaine	vaudeville	Mazères		
1825	Le Plus beau jour de la vie	vaudeville	Varner		
1825	La Charge à payer, ou La Mère intrigante	vaudeville	Varner		
1825	Les Inséparables	vaudeville	Dupin		
1825	Le Maçon	opéra-comique	Delavigne	Auber	
1825	Le Charlatanisme	vaudeville	Mazères		
1825	Les Empiriques d'autrefois	vaudeville	Alexandre (pseudonym of Mme. Friedelle)		
1825	Le Mauvais Sujet	drame	Camille (pseudonym of Pillet)		
1825	Les Premières Amours, ou Les Souvenirs d'enfance	vaudeville			
1825	La Dame blanche	opéra-comique		Adrien Boieldieu	
1825	Le Médecin des dames	vaudeville	Mélesville		
1826	Le Confident	vaudeville	Mélesville		
1826	La Demoiselle à marier	vaudeville	Mélesville		
1826	Le Testament de Polichinelle	vaudeville	Moreau, Lafortelle		
1826	Les Manteaux	vaudeville	Dupin, Varner		
1826	La Belle-mère	vaudeville	Jean-François Bayard		
1826	La Vieille	opéra-comique	Delavigne	Fétis	
1826	L'Oncle d'Amérique	vaudeville	Mazères		
1826	La Lune de miel	vaudeville	Mélesville		
1826	La Demoiselle de compagnie	vaudeville	Mazères		
1826	Simple Histoire	vaudeville	Frederic de Courcy		
1826	Le Timide, ou Le Nouveau séducteur	opéra-comique	Saintine	Auber	
1826	L'Ambassadeur	vaudeville	Mélesville		
1826	Le Mariage de raison	vaudeville	Varner		
1826	Fiorella	opéra-comique		Auber	
1827	La Famille du faubourg	vaudeville	Varner		
1827	La Chatte métamorphosée en femme	vaudeville	Mélesville, Bouchard		
1827	Le loup-garou	opéra-comique	Mazères	Bertin	
1827	Les Élèves du Conservatoire	vaudeville	Saintine		
1827	La Lettre posthume	opéra-comique	Mélesville	Kreubé	
1827	La somnambule, ou L'arrivée d'un nouveau seigneur	ballet-pantomime		Auber	
1827	Le Diplomate	vaudeville	Delavigne		
1827	La Marraine	vaudeville	Lockroy, Jules Chabot de Bouin		
1827	Le Mariage d'argent	comédie			
1827	Le Mal du pays, ou La Batelière de Brientz	opéra-vaudeville	Mélesville	Adolphe Adam	
1828	La Muette de Portici	opéra	Delavigne	Auber	
1828	Prince Charmant, ou Les contes de fées	folie-vaudeville			reprise of La Princesse de Tarare (1816)
1828	Yelva, ou L'Orpheline russe	vaudeville	Ferdinand de Villeneuve, Desvergers		
1828	Le Vieux Mari	vaudeville	Mélesville		
1828	La Manie des places	vaudeville	Bayard		
1828	Avant pendant et après: esquisses historiques	drame	Michel-Nicolas Balisson de Rougemont		
1828	Le Comte Ory	opéra	Delestre-Poirson	Gioachino Rossini	
1828	Le Baron de Trenck	vaudeville	Delavigne		
1828	Les Moralistes	vaudeville	Varner		
1828	Malvina, ou Un Mariage d'inclination	vaudeville			
1829	La Fiancée	opéra-comique		Auber	
1829	Théobald ou Le Retour de Russie	vaudeville	Varner		
1829	Madame de Saint-Agnès, ou La Femme à principes	vaudeville	Varner		
1829	Aventures et voyages du petit Jonas	vaudeville	Dupin		
1829	La Belle au bois dormant	ballet-pantomime		Ferdinand Hérold	
1829	Les Deux Nuits	opéra-comique	Jean-Nicolas Bouilly	Boieldieu	
1829	La Bohémienne, ou L'Amérique en 1775	comédie	Mélesville		
1829	La Famille du baron	vaudeville	Mélesville		
1829	Les Actionnaires	vaudeville	Bayard		
1829	Alcibiade	opéra		Charles Hanssens	
1829	Les Héritiers de M. de Crac	vaudeville			revision of Le Gascon (1815)
1829	Louise, ou La Réparation	vaudeville	Mélesville, Bayard		
1829	Les Inconsolables	comédie			
1829	La Cour d'assises	vaudeville	Varner		
1830	La Seconde Année	vaudeville			
1830	Fra Diavolo, ou L'Hôtellerie de Terracine	opéra-comique		Auber	
1830	Zoé, ou L'Amante prêté	vaudeville	Mélesville		
1830	Vieux fou	vaudeville			revision of Mon oncle César (1821)
1830	L'Assurance ou Le Coucher de la mariée	vaudeville			under the pen name Félix S
1830	Philippe	vaudeville	Mélesville		
1830	Manon Lescaut	ballet-pantomime		Halévy	
1830	Le Foyer du Gymnase	prologue	Mélesville, Bayard		
1830	Une faute	vaudeville			
1830	Le Dieu et la Bayadère	opéra-ballet		Auber	
1830	L'Enlèvement, ou Les Guelfes et les Gibelins	opéra-comique		Pierre-Joseph-Guillaume Zimmerman	
1830	La Protectrice et le ministre	vaudeville	Varner		
1830	Fra Ambrosio ou Les Mœurs de Rome	proverbe			
1830	Jeune et vieille, ou Le Premier et le dernier chapitre	vaudeville	Mélesville, Bayard		
1830	L'Amazone	opéra-comique		Amédée de Beauplan	adaptation of Le Petit dragon (1817)
1831	La Famille Riquebourg	vaudeville			
1831	Les Trois maîtresses	vaudeville	Bayard		
1831	Le Budget d'un jeune ménage	vaudeville	Bayard		
1831	Le Quaker et la Danseuse	vaudeville	Paul Duport		
1831	La Favorite	vaudeville			
1831	Le Philtre	opéra		Auber	
1831	Le Comte de Saint-Ronan	vaudeville	Dupin		
1831	L'Orgie	ballet-pantomime	Jean Coralli	Michele Carafa	
1831	La Marquise de Brinvilliers	drame lyrique	Castil-Blaze	various (Note: Eight composers contributed to the score: Daniel Auber, Désiré-Alexandre Batton, Henri-Montan Berton, Felice Blangini, Adrien Boieldieu, Michele Carafa, Luigi Cherubini, Ferdinand Hérold and Ferdinando Paer.)	
1831	Le Clerc de la bazoche	drame			
1831	Le Suisse de l'hôtel	vaudeville	Rougemont		
1831	Robert le Diable	opéra	Delavigne	Giacomo Meyerbeer	
1831	Le Soprano	vaudeville	Mélesville		
1831	Dom Miguel, ou Le Luthier de Lisbonne	vaudeville	Bayard		
1832	La Vengeance italienne, ou Un Français à Florence	vaudeville	Delestre-Poirson, Charles Desnoyer		
1832	Le Chaperon	vaudeville	Duport		
1832	Zémire et Azor	opéra-comique		Jean Schneitzhoeffer (Note: This followed an earlier opera (1777) of the same title by André Grétry and Jean François Marmontel.)	
1832	Le Savant	vaudeville	Monvel		
1832	Schahabaham II, ou Les Caprices d'un autocrate	vaudeville	Saintine		
1832	Dix ans de la vie d'une femme	drame	Thomas Terrier		
1832	L'Apollon du réverbère	vaudeville	Mélesville, Saintine		
1832	Une monomanie	vaudeville			
1832	Le Paysan amoureux	vaudeville	Bayard		
1832	Le Serment	opéra	Mazères	Auber	
1832	La Médecine sans médecin	opéra-comique	Bayard	Hérold	
1832	La Grande Aventure	vaudeville	Varner		
1832	Toujours, ou L'Avenir d'un fils	vaudeville	Varner		
1832	Camilla, ou La Sœur et le frère	vaudeville	Duport		
1833	Les Vieux Péchés	vaudeville	Mélesville		
1833	Le Voyage dans l'appartement ou L'Influence des localités	vaudeville	Duport		
1833	Les Malheurs d'un amant heureux	vaudeville			
1833	Une répétition générale	vaudeville	Desvergers, Varin		
1833	Gustave III, ou Le Bal masqué	opéra		Auber	
1833	La Nouvelle madame Evrard	vaudeville	Duport		
1833	Le Gardien	vaudeville	Bayard		
1833	Le Moulin de Javelle	vaudeville	Mélesville		
1833	La Prison d'Édimbourg	opéra-comique	Planard	Carafa	
1833	Ali-Baba, ou les Quarante voleurs	opéra	Mélesville	Luigi Cherubini	
1833	Jean de Vert	féerie	Mélesville, Carmouche		
1833	Un trait de Paul 1er, ou Le Czar et la vivandière	vaudeville	Duport		
1833	La Dugazon ou le Choix d'une maîtresse	vaudeville	Duport		
1833	Bertrand et Raton ou l'Art de conspirer	comédie			
1833	Le Lorgnon	vaudeville			
1833	La Chanoinesse	vaudeville	Cornu		
1834	La Passion secrète	comédie			
1834	Salvoisy, ou L'Amoureux de la reine	vaudeville	Rougemont, Alexis Decomberousse		
1834	Lestocq, ou L'Intrigue et l'amour	opéra-comique		Auber	
1834	La Frontière de Savoie	vaudeville	Bayard, Delestre-Poirson		
1834	Le Fils du prince	opéra-comique		Alphonse Clarke	
1834	Le Chalet	opéra-comique	Mélesville	Adam	
1834	Estelle, ou Le Père et la fille	vaudeville			
1834	L'Ambitieux	comédie			
1834	La Femme qu'on n'aime plus	vaudeville	Narcisse Fournier		
1835	La Juive	opéra		Halévy	
1835	Être aimé ou mourir	vaudeville	Dumanoir		
1835	Le Cheval de bronze	opéra-comique		Auber	
1835	Une Chaumière et son cœur	comédie-vaudeville	Alphonse de Laforest		
1835	Le Portefaix	opéra-comique		José Melchor Gomis	
1835	La Pensionnaire mariée	vaudeville	Varner		
1836	Valentine	vaudeville			
1836	Actéon	opéra-comique	Mélesville	Auber	
1836	Les Huguenots	opéra	Deschamps	Meyerbeer	
1836	Chut!	vaudeville			
1836	Les Chaperons blancs	opéra-comique		Auber	
1836	Marie Seymour, ou le Dévouement filial	drame	Mélesville		
1836	Le Mauvais œil	opéra-comique	Gustave Lemoine	Loïsa Puget	
1836	Sir Hugues de Guilfort	vaudeville	Bayard		
1836	Avis aux coquettes, ou l'Amant singulier	vaudeville	Comberousse		
1836	Le Fils d'un agent de change	vaudeville	Dupin		
1836	L'Ambassadrice	opéra-comique	Saint-Georges	Auber	
1837	La Camaraderie, ou La Courte échelle	comédie			
1837	Les Dames patronnesses ou A quelque chose malheur est bon	vaudeville	Félix Arvers		
1837	L'Outrage	vaudeville	Dupin		
1837	César ou Le Chien du château	vaudeville	Varner		
1837	L'Étudiant et la grande dame	vaudeville	Mélesville		
1837	Le Remplaçant	opéra-comique	Bayard	Désiré-Alexandre Batton	
1837	Les Indépendants	comédie			
1837	Le Domino noir	opéra-comique		Auber	
1838	Le Fidèle berger	opéra-comique	Saint-Georges	Adam	
1838	Guido et Ginevra, ou La Peste de Florence	opéra		Halévy	
1838	Clermont, ou Une femme d'artiste	vaudeville	Emile Vanderburch		
1838	La Volière, ou Les Oiseaux de Boccace	ballet-pantomime	Thérèse Elssler	Casimir Gide	
1838	Marguerite	opéra-comique	de Planard	Boieldieu	
1838	La Figurante ou L'Amour et la danse	opéra-comique	Dupin	Louis Clapisson	
1838	Un ministre sous Louis XV, ou le Secret de rester en place	comédie			
1838	Le Tête-à-tête, ou Trente lieues en poste	comédie			
1838	Potemkin, ou Un caprice impérial	comédie			
1838	Le Jeune docteur, ou le Moyen de parvenir	comédie			
1839	Régine, ou Deux nuits	opéra-comique		Adam	
1839	Le Lac des fées	opéra	Mélesville	Auber	
1839	Les Treize	opéra-comique	Duport	Halévy	
1839	Polichinelle	opéra-comique	Charles Duveyrier	Alexandre Montfort	
1839	La Tarentule	ballet	Coralli	Casimir Gide	
1839	Le Duc d'Albe	opéra	Duveyrier	Donizetti	incomplete; unperformed in creators' lifetimes
1839	Le Shérif	opéra-comique		Halévy	
1839	La Reine d'un jour	opéra-comique	Saint-Georges	Adam	
1839	La Xacarilla	opéra		Marco Aurelie Marliani	
1840	Le Drapier	opéra		Halévy	
1840	La Calomnie	comédie			
1840	La Grand-mère, ou Les Trois amours	comédie			
1840	Les Martyrs	opéra		Gaetano Donizetti	
1840	Zanetta, ou Jouer avec le feu	opéra-comique		Auber	
1840	L'Opéra à la cour	opéra-comique	Saint-Georges	Arranged by Albert Grisar and Boieldieu (Note: The score was a pastiche, consisting of music by Auber, Donizetti, Méhul, Mozart, Rossini and Weber, among others.)	
1840	Japhet, ou La Recherche d'un père	comédie	Émile Vanderburch		
1840	Le Verre d'eau, ou Les Effets et les causes	comédie			
1840	La Favorite	opéra	Alphonse Royer, Gustave Vaëz	Donizetti	
1840	Cicily, ou Le Lion amoureux	vaudeville			
1841	Le Guitarrero	opéra-comique		Halévy	
1841	Le Veau d'or	vaudeville	Dupin		
1841	Les Diamants de la couronne	opéra-comique	Saint-Georges	Auber	
1841	Carmagnola	opéra		Ambroise Thomas	
1841	La Main de fer, ou Un mariage secret	opéra-comique	Adolphe de Leuven	Adam	
1841	Une chaine	comédie			
1842	Le Diable à l'école	opéra-comique		Ernest Boulanger	
1842	Le Duc d'Olonne	opéra-comique	Saintine	Auber	
1842	Oscar, ou Le Mari qui trompe sa femme	comédie	Duveyrier		
1842	Le Code noir	opéra-comique		Clapisson	
1842	Le Kiosque	opéra-comique	Paul Duport	Jacques Féréol Mazas	
1842	Le Fils de Cromwell	comédie			
1843	La Part du diable	opéra-comique		Auber	
1843	Le Puits d'amour	opéra-comique	de Leuven	Michael Balfe	
1843	Lambert Simnel	opéra-comique	Mélesville	Adam, completing score by Hippolyte Monpou	
1843	Dom Sébastien roi de Portugal	opéra		Donizetti	
1843	La Tutrice, ou l'Emploi des richesses	comédie	Duport		
1844	Cagliostro	opéra-comique	Saint-Georges	Adam	
1844	Oreste et Pylade	opéra-comique	Dupin	Adolphe Thys	
1844	La Sirène	opéra-comique		Auber	
1844	Les Surprises	vaudeville			
1844	Babiole et Joblot	vaudeville	Saintine		
1844	Rebecca	vaudeville			
1844	Ein Feldlager in Schlesien	Singspiel	Ludwig Rellstab, Charlotte Birch-Pfieffer	Meyerbeer	French libretto written by Scribe (anonymously) and translated into German
1845	L'Image	vaudeville	Thomas Sauvage		
1845	La Barcarolle	opéra-comique		Auber	
1845	Jeanne et Jeanneton	vaudeville	Werner		
1845	Le Ménétrier, ou Les Deux duchesses	opéra-comique		Théodore Labarre	
1845	La Charbonnière	opéra-comique	Mélesville	Montfort	
1845	Ma Mère L'Oie	pantomime			
1845	La Loi salique	vaudeville			
1846	Geneviève	vaudeville			
1846	La Protégée sans le savoir	vaudeville			
1847	Ne touchez pas à la reine	opéra-comique	Vaëz	Xavier Boisselot	
1847	Irène ou le Magnétisme	vaudeville	Lockroy		
1847	Le Sultan Satadin	opéra-comique		Luigi Bordése	
1847	L'Aranda ou Les Grandes passions	vaudeville			
1847	Une femme qui se jette par la fenêtre	vaudeville	Lemoine		
1847	La Déesse	vaudeville	Saintine		
1847	Didier l'honnête homme	vaudeville	Michel Masson		
1847	Haydée, ou Le Secret	opéra-comique		Auber	
1848	Le Puff ou Mensonge et vérité	comédie			
1848	La Nuit de Noël	opéra-comique		Napoléon Henri Reber	
1848	Jeanne la folle	opéra		Clapisson	
1848	Ô amitié !	vaudeville	Varner		
1849	Les Filles du docteur	vaudeville	Masson		
1849	Adrienne Lecouvreur	drame	Ernest Legouvé		
1849	Le Prophète	opéra		Meyerbeer	
1849	La Fée aux roses	opéra-comique	Saint-Georges	Halévy	
1850	Héloïse et Abélard, ou A quelque chose malheur est bon	vaudeville	Masson		
1850	La Statue équestre	opéra		Clapisson	
1850	Giralda, ou La Nouvelle Psyché	opéra-comique		Adam	
1850	Les Contes de la reine de Navarre	comédie			
1850	La Chanteuse voilée, ou La Revanche de Pavie	opéra-comique		Victor Massé	
1850	L'Enfant prodigue	opéra		Auber	
1850	La Dame de pique	opéra-comique		Halévy	
1850	La Fille du roi René ou le Val des fées	drame-vaudeville	Gustave Lemoine		
1851	La Tempesta	opéra-comique		Fromental Halévy	
1851	Bataille de dames	comédie			
1851	Les Malheurs heureux	proverbe			
1851	Zerline, ou la Corbeille d'oranges	opéra		Auber	
1851	Florinda, ou les Maures en Espagne	opéra		Thalberg	
1851	Mosquita la sorcière	opéra	Vaëz	Boisselot	
1852	Madame Schlick	vaudeville	Varner		
1852	Le Juif errant	opéra		Halévy	
1852	Le Vieux Château	opéra-comique		Charles van der Does	
1852	Le Mystère d'Udolphe	opéra-comique	Delavigne	Clapisson	
1852	Marco Spada	opéra-comique		Auber	
1853	La Lettre au Bon Dieu	opéra-comique	Couroy	Gilbert Duprez	
1853	Le Nabab	opéra-comique	Saint-Georges	Halévy	
1854	Mon étoile	comédie			
1854	L'Étoile du nord	opéra-comique		Meyerbeer	
1854	La Fiancée du diable	opéra-comique	Hippolyte Romand	Massé	
1854	La Nonne sanglante	opéra	Delavigne	Charles Gounod	
1855	La Czarine	drame			
1855	Jenny Bell	opéra-comique		Auber	
1855	Jacqueline ou la Fille du soldat	opéra-comique	Léon Battu, Fournier	Rainulphe d'Osmond, Jules Costé	
1855	Les Vêpres siciliennes	opéra	Duveyrier	Giuseppe Verdi	
1856	Manon Lescaut	opéra-comique		Auber	
1857	Marco Spada	ballet-pantomime	Mazilier	Auber	
1858	Feu Lionel	comédie			
1858	Les Doigts de fée	comédie			
1858	La Chatte métamorphosée en femme	opéra-comique	Mélesville	Jacques Offenbach	
1858	Broskovano	opéra-comique	Henry Boisseaux	Louis Deffès	
1858	Les Trois Maupin, ou La Veille de la Régence	comédie	Boisseaux		
1858	Les Trois Nicolas	opéra-comique	Bernard Lopez, Gabriel de Lurieu	Clapisson	
1859	Réves d'amour	comédie	Edmond de Biéville		
1859	Les Violons du Roi	opéra-comique	Boisseaux	Deffès	
1859	Yvonne	drame lyrique		Armand Limnander	
1859	La Fille de trente ans	comédie	Émile de Najac		
1860	Barkouf	opéra-comique	Boisseaux	Offenbach	
1861	La Circassienne	opéra-comique		Auber	
1861	Madame Grégoire	opéra-comique	Boisseaux	Clapisson	
1861	La Beauté du diable	opéra-comique	Najac	Jules Alary	
1861	La Frileuse	comédie			under the pen name Augustin Debersy
1864	La Fiancée du roi de Garbe	opéra-comique	Saint-Georges	Auber	posthumously staged
1865	L'Africaine	opéra		Meyerbeer	posthumously staged

== Plays adapted into opera libretti ==
- 1831: A ballet-pantomime became the basis of the Italian libretto for Bellini's La sonnambula
- 1832: Le philtre was adapted by Felice Romani into the libretto for Donizetti's L'elisir d'amore
- 1902: Adriana Lecouvreur (written in collaboration with Ernest Legouvé) was adapted into a libretto by Arturo Colautti for Francesco Cilea's Adriana Lecouvreur

== Films ==
Many of the stage works on which Scribe worked have been adapted for the cinema. They include:

- The Dumb Girl of Portici, directed by Phillips Smalley and Lois Weber (1916, based on the opera La muette de Portici)
- Feenhände, directed by Rudolf Biebrach (Germany, 1917, based on the play Les Doigts de fée)
- Masked Ball, directed by Alfréd Deésy (Austria-Hungary, 1917, based on the opera Un ballo in maschera)
- La Calomnie, directed by Maurice Mariaud (France, 1918, based on the play La Calomnie)
- Die Jüdin, directed by Luise Kolm and Jacob Fleck (Austria-Hungary, 1918, based on the opera La Juive)
- Adriana Lecouvreur, directed by Ugo Falena (Italy, 1919, based on the play Adrienne Lecouvreur)
- La moglie che si gettò dalla finestra, directed by Gian Bistolfi (Italy, 1920, based on the play Une femme qui se jette par la fenêtre)
- Dita di fata, directed by Nino Giannini (Italy, 1921, based on the play Les Doigts de fée)
- The Mute of Portici, directed by Arthur Günsburg (Germany, 1922, based on the opera La muette de Portici)
- A Glass of Water, directed by Ludwig Berger (Germany, 1923, based on the play Le Verre d'eau)
- The Faces of Love, directed by Carmine Gallone (Italy, 1924, based on the play Adrienne Lecouvreur)
- La muta di Portici, directed by Telemaco Ruggeri (Italy, 1924, based on the opera La muette de Portici)
- Der Kampf um den Mann, directed by Hans Werckmeister and Armand Guerra (Germany, 1928, based on the play La Bataille de Dames)
- Dream of Love, directed by Fred Niblo (1928, based on the play Adrienne Lecouvreur)
- The Black Domino, directed by Victor Janson (Germany, 1929, based on the opera Le Domino noir)
- Devil-May-Care, directed by Sidney Franklin (1929, based on the play La Bataille de Dames)
- Fra Diavolo, directed by Mario Bonnard (France, 1931, based on the opera Fra Diavolo)
  - Fra Diavolo, directed by Mario Bonnard (Germany, 1931, based on the opera Fra Diavolo)
- The Devil's Brother, directed by Hal Roach (1933, based on the opera Fra Diavolo)
- The Ambassador, directed by Baldassarre Negroni (Italy, 1936, based on the play Le Diplomate)
- Adrienne Lecouvreur, directed by Marcel L'Herbier (France, 1938, based on the play Adrienne Lecouvreur)
- L'elisir d'amore, directed by Amleto Palermi (Italy, 1941, based on the opera L'elisir d'amore)
- The Queen of Navarre, directed by Carmine Gallone (Italy, 1942, based on the play Les Contes de la reine de Navarre)
- L'elisir d'amore, directed by Mario Costa (Italy, 1946, based on the opera L'elisir d'amore)
- Sicilian Uprising, directed by Giorgio Pastina (Italy, 1949, based on the opera Les vêpres siciliennes)
- La sonnambula, directed by Cesare Barlacchi (Italy, 1952, based on the opera La sonnambula)
- The Mute of Portici, directed by Giorgio Ansoldi (Italy, 1952, based on the opera La muette de Portici)
- Adriana Lecouvreur, directed by Guido Salvini (Italy, 1955, based on the play Adrienne Lecouvreur)
- A Glass of Water, directed by Helmut Käutner (West Germany, 1960, based on the play Le Verre d'eau)
- A Glass of Water, directed by Yuli Karasik (USSR, 1979, based on the play Le Verre d'eau)

== Notes, references and sources ==
=== Sources ===
- Koon, Helene; Richard Switzer (1980). Eugène Scribe. Boston: Twayne. ISBN 978-0-80-576390-4.
- Larousse, Pierre (1875). Grand dictionnaire Universel du XIXe siècle. Vol. XIV. Paris: Grand dictionnaire Universel. OCLC 1170460660.
- Meyer, Peter (2003). "Introduction". Feydeau. London: Oberon. ISBN 978-1-84943-993-0.
