= The Mute of Portici =

The Mute of Portici may refer to:

- La muette de Portici, an opera by Daniel Auber
- The Mute of Portici (1952 film), an Italian historical melodrama film
- The Mute of Portici (1922 film), a German silent film

== See also ==
- The Dumb Girl of Portici, a 1916 American silent historical drama film
