= List of operas by Daniel Auber =

This French composer Daniel François Esprit Auber (1782–1871) is best known for his operas, including 31 opéras comiques, 7 opéras, 3 drames lyriques, and one each of works designated as comédie, comédie mêlée de chant, intermède, opéra féerie, opéra historique, scène lyrique and scène-prologue. All were premiered in Paris, except Jean de Couvain, which was premiered in Chimay (now in Belgium), and La fête de Versailles, which was premiered in Versailles.

== List of operas ==
Operas by Daniel Auber
Title	Genre	Acts	Libretto	Premiere	
Title	Genre	Acts	Libretto	Date	Venue
Julie (L'erreur d'un moment)	comédie	1 act	Jacques Marie Boutet (Monvel)	1805	Salle Doyen
Jean de Couvain	opéra comique	3 acts	Népomucène Lemercier	September 1812	Château de Chimay
Le séjour militaire	opéra comique	1 act	Jean-Nicolas Bouilly and Emanuel Mercier-Dupaty	27 February 1813	Opéra-Comique, Salle Feydeau
Le testament et les billets doux	comédie mêlée de chant	1 act	François-Antoine-Eugène Planard	18 September 1819	Opéra-Comique, Salle Feydeau
La bergère châtelaine	opéra comique	3 acts	François-Antoine-Eugène Planard	27 January 1820	Opéra-Comique, Salle Feydeau
Emma, ou La promesse imprudente	opéra comique	3 acts	François-Antoine-Eugène Planard	7 July 1821	Opéra-Comique, Salle Feydeau
Leicester, ou Le château de Kenilworth	opéra comique	3 acts	Eugène Scribe and Mélesville, after Walter Scott	25 January 1823	Opéra-Comique, Salle Feydeau
La neige, ou Le nouvel Eginhard	opéra comique	4 acts	Eugène Scribe and Germain Delavigne	8 October 1823	Opéra-Comique, Salle Feydeau
Vendôme en Espagne (written in collaboration with Ferdinand Hérold)	drame lyrique	1 act	Adolphe-Simonis Empis and Edouard Mennechet	5 December 1823	Paris Opera, Salle Le Peletier
Les trois genres (written in collaboration with François-Adrien Boieldieu)	scène lyrique	Prologue and 1 act	Eugène Scribe, Emanuel Mercier-Dupaty and Michel Pichat	27 April 1824	Théâtre de l'Odéon
Le concert à la cour, ou La débutante	opéra comique	1 act	Eugène Scribe and Mélésville	5 May 1824	Opéra-Comique, Salle Feydeau
Léocadie	drame lyrique	3 acts	Eugène Scribe and Mélésville, after Miguel de Cervantes Saavedra	4 November 1824	Opéra-Comique, Salle Feydeau
Le maçon	opéra comique	3 acts	Eugène Scribe and Germain Delavigne	3 May 1825	Opéra-Comique, Salle Feydeau
Le timide, ou Le nouveau séducteur	opéra comique	3 acts	Eugène Scribe and X. B. Saintine	2 June 1826	Opéra-Comique, Salle Feydeau
Fiorella	opéra comique	3 acts	Eugène Scribe	28 November 1826	Opéra-Comique, Salle Feydeau
La muette de Portici (also known as Masaniello)	opéra	5 acts	Eugène Scribe and Germain Delavigne	29 February 1828	Paris Opera, Salle Le Peletier
La fiancée	opéra comique	3 acts	Eugène Scribe, after Les contes de l'atelier by Michel Masson and Raymond Brucker	10 January 1829	Opéra-Comique, Salle Feydeau
Fra Diavolo, ou L’hôtellerie de Terracine	opéra comique	3 acts	Eugène Scribe	28 January 1830	Opéra-Comique, Salle Ventadour. Revised in Italian, with added numbers and spoken dialogue replaced by recitatives; London, Lyceum Theatre, 9 July 1857
Le dieu et la bayadère, ou La courtisane amoureuse	opéra	2 acts	Eugène Scribe	13 October 1830	Paris Opera, Salle Le Peletier
Le philtre	opéra	2 acts	Eugène Scribe	20 June 1831	Paris Opera, Salle Le Peletier
La marquise de Brinvilliers (written in collaboration with Désiré-Alexandre Batton, Henri-Montan Berton, Giuseppe Marco Maria Felice Blangini, François-Adrien Boieldieu, Michele Carafa, Luigi Cherubini, Ferdinand Hérold and Ferdinando Paer)	drame lyrique	3 acts	Eugène Scribe and Castil-Blaze	31 October 1831	Opéra-Comique, Salle Ventadour
Le serment, ou Les faux-monnayeurs	opéra	3 acts	Eugène Scribe and Édouard-Joseph-Ennemond Mazères	1 October 1832	Paris Opera, Salle Le Peletier
Gustave III, ou Le bal masqué	opéra historique	5 acts	Eugène Scribe	27 February 1833	Paris Opera, Salle Le Peletier
Lestocq, ou L’intrigue et l’amour	opéra comique	4 acts	Eugène Scribe	24 May 1834	Opéra-Comique, Salle de la Bourse
Le cheval de bronze	opéra féerie	3 acts	Eugène Scribe	23 March 1835	Opéra-Comique, Salle de la Bourse. Revised with a ballet added; 21 September 1857, Paris Opera, Salle Le Peletier
Actéon	opéra comique	1 act	Eugène Scribe	23 January 1836	Opéra-Comique, Salle de la Bourse
Les chaperons blancs	opéra comique	3 acts	Eugène Scribe	9 April 1836	Opéra-Comique, Salle de la Bourse
L'ambassadrice	opéra comique	3 acts	Eugène Scribe and Henri Vernoy de Saint-Georges	21 December 1836	Opéra-Comique, Salle de la Bourse
La fête de Versailles	intermède	1 act	Eugène Scribe	10 June 1837	Palace of Versailles
Le domino noir	opéra comique	3 acts	Eugène Scribe	2 December 1837	Opéra-Comique, Salle de la Bourse
Le lac des fées	opéra	5 acts	Eugène Scribe and Mélésville	1 April 1839	Paris Opera, Salle Le Peletier
Zanetta, ou Jouer avec le feu	opéra comique	3 acts	Eugène Scribe and Henri Vernoy de Saint-Georges	18 May 1840	Opéra-Comique, Salle Favart II
Les diamants de la couronne	opéra comique	3 acts	Eugène Scribe and Henri Vernoy de Saint-Georges	6 March 1841	Opéra-Comique, Salle Favart II
Le duc d'Olonne	opéra comique	3 acts	Eugène Scribe and Xavier Saintine	4 February 1842	Opéra-Comique, Salle Favart II
La part du diable	opéra comique	3 acts	Eugène Scribe	16 January 1843	Opéra-Comique, Salle Favart II
La sirène	opéra comique	3 acts	Eugène Scribe	26 March 1844	Opéra-Comique, Salle Favart II
La barcarolle, ou L’amour et la musique	opéra comique	3 acts	Eugène Scribe	22 April 1845	Opéra-Comique, Salle Favart II
Les premiers pas (written in collaboration with Adolphe Adam, Michele Carafa and Fromental Halévy)	scène-prologue	Prologue and 1 act	Alphonse Royer and Gustave Vaëz	15 November 1847	Opéra-National, Cirque Olympique
Haydée, ou Le secret	opéra comique	3 acts	Eugène Scribe, based on Le parti de trictrac (1830) by Prosper Mérimée	28 December 1847	Opéra-Comique, Salle Favart II
L'enfant prodigue	opéra	5 acts	Eugène Scribe	6 December 1850	Paris Opera, Salle Le Peletier
Zerline, ou La corbeille d'oranges	opéra	3 acts	Eugène Scribe	16 May 1851	Paris Opera, Salle Le Peletier
Marco Spada	opéra comique	3 acts	Eugène Scribe and Germain Delavigne; final scene after La confession du bandit by Horace Vernet	21 December 1852	Opéra-Comique, Salle Favart II
Jenny Bell	opéra comique	3 acts	Eugène Scribe	2 June 1855	Opéra-Comique, Salle Favart II
Manon Lescaut	opéra comique	3 acts	Eugène Scribe, after L'histoire du chevalier des Grieux et de Manon Lescaut by Antoine François Prévost	23 February 1856	Opéra-Comique, Salle Favart II
La circassienne	opéra comique	3 acts	Eugène Scribe	2 February 1861	Opéra-Comique, Salle Favart II
La fiancée du roi de Garbe	opéra comique	3 acts	Eugène Scribe and Henri Vernoy de Saint-Georges	11 January 1864	Opéra-Comique, Salle Favart II
Le premier jour de bonheur	opéra comique	3 acts	Adolphe d'Ennery and Eugène Cormon	15 February 1868	Opéra-Comique, Salle Favart II
Rêve d'amour	opéra comique	3 acts	Adolphe d'Ennery and Eugène Cormon	20 December 1869	Opéra-Comique, Salle Favart II
