= List of compositions by Matteo Carcassi =

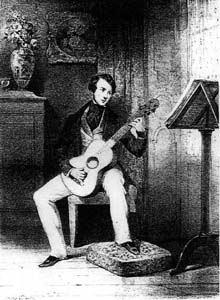
Matteo Carcassi

This is a list of compositions by Matteo Carcassi.

== With opus numbers ==
Opus 26 No. 1

Opus 26 No. 3

Opus 60 No. 1

Opus 60 No. 6

Op. 1, 3 sonates - 3 sonatas
Op. 2, 3 rondos - 3 rondos
Op. 3, 12 petites pieces - 12 small pieces
Op. 4, 6 valses - 6 waltzes
Op. 5, Le nouveau papillon, ou choix d'airs faciles et soigneusement doigtes - The new butterfly, or choice of easy and carefully fingered airs
Op. 6, Introduction, variations, et finale sur un duo favori - Introduction, variations, and finale on a favorite duo
Op. 7, "Au clair de la lune", varie - "Under the moonlight", with variations
Op. 8, Etrennes aux amateurs, ou nouveau recueil de 6 contredanses francaises, 6 valses, et 3 airs varies - Gifts for enthusiasts, or new collection of 6 French contradances, 6 waltzes, and 3 airs with variations
Op. 9, 3 airs italiens varies - 3 Italian airs with variations
Op. 10, Amusement, ou choix de 12 morceaux faciles et soigneusement doigtes - Amusement, or choice of 12 easy and carefully fingered pieces
Op. 11, Recueil de 10 petites pieces - Collection of 10 small pieces
Op. 12, 3 themes varies - 3 themes with variations
Op. 13, 4 potpourris des plus jolis airs des operas de Rossini - 4 medleys of very pretty airs from operas by Rossini
Op. 14, Melange de 22 morceaux faciles et soigneusement doigtes - Mix of 22 easy and carefully fingered pieces
Op. 15, "Tra la la", air varie - "Tra la la", air with variations
Op. 16, 8 divertissements - 8 divertimentos
Op. 17, "Le songe de Rousseau", air varie - "Rousseau's dream", air with variations
Op. 18, 6 airs varies d'une execution brillante et facile - 6 airs with variations with a brilliant and easy execution
Op. 19, Fantaisie sur les plus jolis airs de l'opera Robin Des Bois (Der Freischütz) - Fantasy on the very pretty airs of the opera Robin of the Forest (Der Freischütz)
Op. 20, Air suisse varie - Swiss air with variations
Op. 21, Les recreations des commencans, ou choix de 24 petites pieces - The recreation for the beginners, or choice of 24 small pieces
Op. 22, Air ecossais de l'opera La Dame Blanche - Scottish air from the opera The White Lady
Op. 23, 12 valses - 12 Waltzes
Op. 24, Air des Mysteres d'Isis, varie - Air from Mysteries of Isis with variations
Op. 25, 2me recueil de 8 divertissements - 2nd collection of 8 divertimentos
Op. 26, 6 caprices - 6 capriccios
Op. 27, Variations Brillantes sur un Theme Allemand
Op. 28, 2 airs de ballets de l'opera de Moise de Rossini - 2 ballet airs from the opera Moses by Rossini
Op. 29, Variationes brillantes sur L' air Favori Petit Blanc - French song by A.M.Panseron en text M. Boucher de Perthes.
Op. 30, Ouverture de Semiramide du celebre Rossini
Op. 31, Variations brillantes pour la guitare, sur un thême [Non più mesta] de la Cenerentola [by G. A. Rossini] ...
Op. 32, lost?
Op. 33, 6 fantasies sur des motifs d'operas favoris: No. 1. La Muette De Portici - 6 fantasies on motives from favorite operas: Nr. 1. The Mute Girl of Portici
Op. 34, No. 2. Le Comte Ory - The Count Ory
Op. 35, No. 3. La Fiancee - The Bride
Op. 36, No. 4. Guillaume Tell - William Tell
Op. 37, No. 5. Fra Diavolo - Fra Diavolo
Op. 38, No. 6. Le Dieu Et La Bayadere - The God and the Bayadere
Op. 39, Douze Galops et Six Vals
Op. 40, Fantaisie sur des motifs de l'opera Zampa - Fantasy on the motives from the opera Zampa
Op. 41, Rondoletto sur l'air favori "Clic clac" - Rondoletto on the favorite air "Clic clac"
Op. 42, Fantasie sur les motifs du "Philtre" de Auber pour la Guitare
Op. 43, Mélange sur des motifs de Zampa, pour piano et guitare
Op. 44, 3 airs suisses varies - 3 Swiss airs with variations
Op. 45, Fantaisie sur des motifs de l'opera Le Serment - Fantasy on the motives from the opera The Oath
Op. 46, FANTAISIE Pour la Guitare Sur les motifs de La Médecine sans Medecin DE F. HEROLD
Op. 47, lost?
Op. 48, Fantaisie sur des motifs de l'opera Le Pre Aux Clercs - Fantasy from the motives from the opera The Clerks' Meadow
Op. 49, Fantaisie sur des motifs de l'opera Gustave - Fantasy on the motives from the opera Gustav
Op. 50, Récréations Musicales (Suite 1-4)
Op. 51, lost?
Op. 52, Valse favarite "Duc de Reichstadt" variee - Favorite waltz "Duke of Reichstadt" with variations
Op. 53, 2 quadrilles de contradanses, 2 walses, et 2 galops - 2 square dances of contradances, 2 waltzes, and 2 galops
Op. 54, Recreations Musicales: Rondeaux, Variations et Fantasie
Op. 55, Valses brillantes à l'espagnole, Meissonier, Paris, 1835
Op. 56, Adieux à la Suisse: Tyrolienne de Bruguière, Variée
Op. 57, Fantaisie sur des motifs de l'opera Le Cheval De Bronze - Fantasy on the motives from the opera The Bronze Horse
Op. 58, lost?
Op. 59, Methode complete. Divisee en trois parties - Complete method. Divided in three parts
Op. 60, 25 etudes melodiques et progressives. 1re suite de la methode - 25 melodic and progressive studies. 1st suite of the method
Op. 61, Variations sur la romance de Greisar Las Lavenses...
Op. 62, Melange sur des motifs de l'opera Sarah - Mix on the motives from the opera Sarah
Op. 63, lost? (Fantaisie sur Les Puritains)
Op. 64, Fantaisie sur des motifs de l'opera Le Postillon De Lonjumeau - Fantasy on the motives from the opera The Coachman of Lonjumeau
Op. 65, lost? (Fantasie)
Op. 66, Melodie Italienne
Op. 67, Mosaique sur de motifs favoris de l'opera Le Domino Noir - Mosaic on the favorite motives from the opera The Black Domino
Op. 68, Choix des plus Jolies Valses de Strauss et de Labitzky arrangéespour la guitare ...
Op. 69, Melange sur les airs favoris du Lac Des Fees - Mix on the favorite airs from The Fairy Lake
Op. 70, Melange sur des motifs de l'opera Zanetta - Mix on the motives from the opera Zanetta
Op. 71, Fantaisie sur des motifs de l'opera Les Diamants De La Couronne - Fantasy on the motives from the opera The Diamonds of the Crown
Op. 72, lost? (Fantaisie sur Le Duc d'Olonne)
Op. 73, Fantaisie sur des motifs de l'opera La Part Du Diable - Fantasy on the motives from the opera The Part of the Devil
Op. 74, Melange sur des themes favoris de La Sirene - Mix on the favorite themes from The Siren
Op. 75, lost?
Op. 76, Fantaisie (La Barcarolle)
Op. 77, Fantaisie pour La Guitare Sur de Motifs de Robert Bruce Opera de G. Rossini

== Without opus numbers ==
- WoO, Recreations musicales de H. Herz. Rondeaux, variations, et fantaisies sur 24 themes favoris, in 4 parts
- WoO, 4 Airs favoris varies
- WoO, 50 Morceaux methodiques et progressifs
- WoO, Fantaisie pour la guitare sur des motifs de Lestocq, de D. F. E. Auber
- WoO, The Queen of the May, or Fiorella polka (no. 225 of "Musical Bouquet".)
- WoO, Variations sur la romance Les Laveuses du couvent
- WoO, Augusta. Polka
- WoO, Crois moi. Romance (song)
- WoO, Das Mädchen auf der Wiese (Once my song), a Swiss air (song)
- WoO, Demain on vous marie. Romance (song)
- WoO, Der müntere Alpenhirt (When the day with rosy light), a Swiss air (song)
- WoO, Douze Romances (Gustave Lemoine) (songs)
- WoO, L'Aigle [song by Loïsa Puget] (Gustave Lemoine)
- WoO, La Bayadère [song by Loïsa Puget] (Gustave Lemoine)
- WoO, La Castillane. Boléro [song by Francesco Masini] (Ernest de Ginoux)
- WoO, La Fiancée du Klephte. Romance [song by Théodore Labarre] (A. Bétourné)
- WoO, La Nuit s'avance. Nocturne à deux voix (Le Comte Messence)
- WoO, La Retraite [song by Loïsa Puget] (Gustave Lemoine)
- WoO, L'Ange aux chants mélodieux. Nocturne à deux voix (Mr. Fuinet)
- WoO, Le Calme. Mélodie (song)
- WoO, Le Départ de la jeune fille. Romance (song)
- WoO, Le Domino noir [vocal themes from the comic opera by D.F.E. Auber]
- WoO, Le Gentil pastour. Romance [song by Auguste Panseron]
- WoO, Le Printemps éternel. Nocturne à deux voix égales (Charles Wagon)
- WoO, Les Adieux à la Provence. Romance [song by Francesco Masini] (Victor Clergeau)
- WoO, Les Amans du hemeau. Chansonette à deux voix (Charles Wagon).
- WoO, L'Hiver. Romance (Mr. Vial)
- WoO, Ma belle ange. Romance [song by Théodore Labarre] (E. Barateau)
- WoO, Ma nacelle est si belle. Barcarolle [song by C.A. Boulanger] (Hyppolite Dugier)
- WoO, Ne lui dis pas que je l'aime [song by Loïsa Puget] (Gustave Lemoine)
- WoO, Plus de mère [song by Loïsa Puget] (Gustave Lemoine)
- WoO, Reine des Nuits. Nocturne à deux voix
- WoO, Sisca l'albanaise (Léon Escudier)
- WoO, Six Fantaisies pour la guitare sur des motifs des opéras nouveaux
- WoO, 't were vain to tell thee, a Swiss air [song with music and words by J.A. Wade]
- WoO, Venez! Nocturne à deux voix (de F***Z)

== Sheet music ==
- At the International Music Score Library Project
- At the Music Library of Sweden
