= La barcarolle (opera) =

Opéra comique by Daniel Auber

La barcarolle, ou L’amour et la musique S. 38, is an opéra comique in 3 acts by Daniel Auber to a libretto by Eugène Scribe. It premiered 22 April 1845 at the Opéra-Comique, Salle Favart.

== Recordings ==
- Act II: Air. "Asile où règne le silence" (Fabio) Cyrille Dubois Orchestre National de Lille Pierre Dumoussaud Alpha 2023
