= The Mute of Portici (1922 film) =

1922 film

- Directed by: Arthur Günsburg
- Based on: La muette de Portici by Germain Delavigne and Eugène Scribe
- Produced by: Arthur Günsburg
- Cinematography: Otto Kanturek
- Production company: Arthur Günsburg-Film
- Distributed by: Arthur Günsburg-Film
- Release date: 12 August 1922
- Country: Germany
- Languages: Silent; German intertitles

The Mute of Portici (German: Die Stumme von Portici) is a 1922 German silent film directed by Arthur Günsburg. It is based on Daniel Auber's opera La muette de Portici.

== Cast ==
In alphabetical order

- Carl de Vogt as Masaniello, fisherman
- Franz Felix as Lorenzo
- Cläre Lotto as Fenella
- Albert Paul as der Erzbischof
- F.W. Schröder-Schrom as Pietro
- Eduard von Winterstein as Viceroy of Naples

== See also ==
- The Dumb Girl of Portici (1916)
- The Mute of Portici (1952)

== Bibliography ==
- Bock, Hans-Michael; Bergfelder, Tim, eds. (2009). The Concise Cinegraph: Encyclopaedia of German Cinema. New York: Berghahn Books. ISBN 978-1-57181-655-9.
