= Arthur Günsburg =

Arthur Günsburg (February 18, 1872 - February 1, 1949) was a film director, producer, and film company executive (A. G. Films) from Vienna, Austria who worked in Germany. He made the first feature film about Rembrandt.

== Filmography ==
- Die Tragödie eines Großen (The Tragedy of a Great Man), a silent historical film about Rembrandt
- Der Gaukler von Paris (The Juggler of Paris) (1922)
- The Mute of Portici (1922 film) (German: Die Stumme von Portici) based on Daniel Auber's opera La muette de Portici
- Ballettratten (1925)
- Die glühende Gasse (1927), directed by Paul Sugar, produced by Arthur Günsburg from the novel by Paul Rosenhayn
