= La sirène (opera) =

1844 opera by Daniel Auber

La sirène is an opéra comique in 3 acts by Daniel Auber to a libretto by Eugène Scribe, premiered 26 March 1844.

== Recording ==
Auber: La Sirène Les Métaboles & Orchestre des Frivolites Parisiennes, David Reiland 1CD Naxos 8.660436 (2019)
