= Die glühende Gasse =

1927 film

- Directed by: Paul Sugar
- Written by: Paul Rosenhayn (novel); Paul Sugar
- Produced by: Arthur Günsburg
- Starring: Hans Albers; Egon von Jordan; Hermann Vallentin
- Cinematography: László Schäffer
- Production company: Arthur Günsburg-Film
- Distributed by: Lloyd Kinofilm
- Release date: 1927
- Country: Germany
- Languages: Silent; German intertitles

Die glühende Gasse is a 1927 German silent film directed by Paul Sugar and starring Hans Albers, Egon von Jordan and Hermann Vallentin.

The film's sets were designed by the art director Franz Seemann.

== Cast ==
- Hans Albers as Der vornehme Fremde
- Egon von Jordan as Prinz Arsen de Rohan
- Hermann Vallentin as Van der Meulen, ein Finanzmann
- Helga Thomas as Diane, seine Tochter
- Eduard von Winterstein as Bankier Raimond
- Angelo Ferrari as Jean Coupot, der Artist
- Hanni Weisse as Ninon, die Tänzerin
- Gyula Szöreghy as Der lebensmüde Wirt 'Zum goldenen Ochsen'
- Adolphe Engers as Snyders, ein merkwürdiger Bräutigam
- Bertold Reissig as Spruit
- Karl Harbacher as Der Hauswirt
- Paul Morgan
- Bernd Aldor
- Aruth Wartan
- Hugo Döblin
- Victor Hartberg
- Alexander Murski

== Bibliography ==
- Bock, Hans-Michael & Bergfelder, Tim. The Concise CineGraph. Encyclopedia of German Cinema. Berghahn Books, 2009.
