= The Tragedy of a Great =

1920 German silent film

- Directed by: Arthur Günsburg
- Written by: Paul Gruner; Helmuth Orthmann
- Produced by: Arthur Günsburg
- Starring: Carl de Vogt; Sybill Morel; Wilhelm Diegelmann
- Cinematography: Arpad Viragh
- Production company: Arthur Günsburg-Film
- Distributed by: Scala-Film-Verleih
- Release date: 24 June 1920
- Country: Germany
- Languages: Silent; German intertitles

The Tragedy of a Great (German: Die Tragödie eines Großen) is a 1920 German silent historical film directed by Arthur Günsburg and starring Carl de Vogt, Sybill Morel, and Wilhelm Diegelmann. It is a biopic of the life of the painter Rembrandt.

The film's sets were designed by the art director Bernhard Schwidewski.

== Cast ==
In alphabetical order

- Fritz Beckmann as Abraham Stün
- Dora Bergner as Nisly
- Carl de Vogt as Rembrandt
- Wilhelm Diegelmann as van Uylenburgh
- Eva Eberth as Hendrickje
- Hans Flieser as Ein alter Diener
- Julius Frucht as Ferdinand Pol
- Willy Kaiser-Heyl as Jan Six
- Paul Meffert as Rembrandts Bruder
- Sybill Morel as Saskia van Uylenburgh
- Clementine Plessner as Rembrandts Mutter
- Georg H. Schnell as Pit Gauwer

== Bibliography ==
- Grange, William (2008). Cultural Chronicle of the Weimar Republic. Lanham, MD: Scarecrow Press. ISBN 978-0-8108-5967-8.
