= The Dumb Girl of Portici =

1916 American silent film

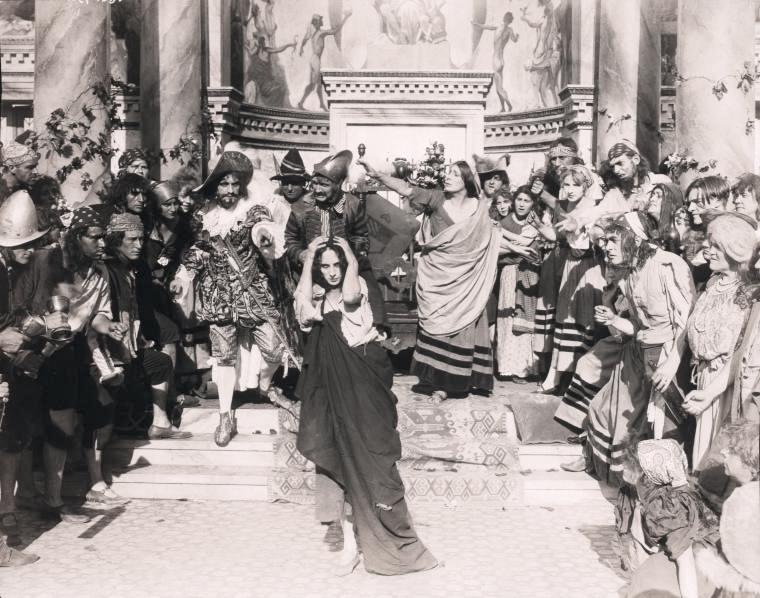
- Anna Pavlova (center foreground)
- Directed by: Phillips Smalley; Lois Weber
- Written by: Lois Weber
- Based on: La muette de Portici; 1828 opera by music Daniel François Esprit Auber libretto Eugène Scribe; Germain Delavigne
- Produced by: Carl Laemmle; Phillips Smalley; Lois Weber
- Starring: Anna Pavlova; Rupert Julian; Wadsworth Harris
- Cinematography: Dal Clawson; Allen G. Siegler; R.W. Walter
- Music by: Adolph Schmidt (Mus accompaniment arr)
- Production company: Universal Film Manufacturing Company
- Distributed by: Universal Film Manufacturing Company
- Release date: April 3, 1916
- Running time: 112 minutes
- Country: United States
- Language: Silent (English intertitles)

The Dumb Girl of Portici is a 1916 American silent historical drama film directed by Phillips Smalley and Lois Weber and starring Anna Pavlova, Rupert Julian and Wadsworth Harris. It was adapted by Weber from the libretto by Germain Delavigne and Eugène Scribe for Daniel Auber's 1828 opera La muette de Portici (The Mute of Portici). The film marked Pavlova's only feature film performance.

== Overview ==
The film was Universal's most expensive film to that date, made at a cost at approximately $300,000. It was also the longest film made by a woman director in the 1910s.

== Plot ==
Full film

Fenella (Anna Pavlova) is a poor Italian girl who falls in love with the Duke's (Wadsworth Harris) son Alphonso, a Spanish nobleman.

== Cast ==
- Anna Pavlova as Fenella
- Rupert Julian as Masaniello
- Wadsworth Harris as Duke d'Arcos
- Douglas Gerrard as Alphonso
- Jack Holt as Conde
- Betty Schade as Isabella
- Edna Maison as Elvira
- Jack Hoxie as Perrone
- William Wolbert as Pietro
- Laura Oakley as Rilla
- Nigel De Brulier as Father Francisco
- Lina Basquette as Child

== Release ==
The film was released on DVD/Blu-ray in 2018 with a new score by John Sweeney.

== See also ==
- The Mute of Portici (1922)
- The Mute of Portici (1952)

== Bibliography ==
- Slide, Anthony. Early Women Directors. A. S. Barnes, 1977.
