= Jacques-Michel Hurel de Lamare =

French cellist (1772–1823)

Jacques-Michel Hurel de Lamare (1 May 1772 – 27 March 1823) was a French cellist.

Lamare was born in Paris, to a poor family. He studied music at a very young age, entering the Institute of the Pages of the Royal Music at age 7, and turning to study of the cello, with Jean-Louis Duport, at age 15. He returned home upon the outbreak of the French Revolution in 1789.

In 1794, Lamare became cellist at the Théâtre Feydeau in Paris, where he developed a reputation as a soloist. He soon thereafter became a professor at the newly founded Conservatoire de Paris, while continuing to perform with the Feydeau. On the strength of his reputation as a performer he decided to leave both positions, and embarked on a tour giving performances abroad. From 1801 through 1809 he toured Germany and Russia, living mainly in Berlin, St. Petersburg, and Moscow. In Berlin, he became acquainted in particular with Prince Louis Ferdinand of Prussia.

Lamare returned to France in 1809, traveling through Poland and Austria. His return concert at the Odéon in April 1809, however, was not very well received, and thereafter he restricted himself to playing for private audiences, where he enjoyed greater acclaim. He married into wealth in 1815, after which he mostly retired from performance, dying in Caen in 1823.

His performance skills were legendary in their time, praised by François-Joseph Fétis among others. He does not appear to have been gifted as a composer, however, and it is not clear whether any works of his survive. Several works were published under his name during his lifetime, including four cello concertos, but these were likely composed by his close friend Daniel Auber.
