= Ballettratten =

1925 film

- Directed by: Arthur Günsburg
- Starring: Carl de Vogt; Cläre Lotto; Victor Varconi
- Cinematography: Otto Kanturek; Károly Vass
- Production company: Arthur Günsburg-Film
- Distributed by: Arthur Günsburg-Film
- Release date: 11 May 1925
- Country: Germany
- Languages: Silent; German intertitles

Ballettratten is a 1925 German silent drama film directed by Arthur Günsburg and starring Carl de Vogt, Cläre Lotto, and Victor Varconi.

The term Ballettratte is based on the French Petit rat.

Full film (Portuguese intertitles)

== Cast ==
- Carl de Vogt as König
- Cläre Lotto as Inge
- Victor Varconi as Intendant Holberg
- Tatjana Irrah as Prima Ballerina Bellini
- Josefine Dora as Frau vom Ballettmeister
- Jaro Fürth as Staatsminister Warborg
- Hermann Picha as Ballettmeister Saltini
- Ernst Wurmser as Magister Branting
