= The Mute of Portici (1952 film) =

1952 film

- Directed by: Giorgio Ansoldi
- Written by: Giorgio Ansoldi; Cesare Ardolino; Alessandro De Stefani; Giacinto Solito
- Starring: Flora Mariel
- Cinematography: Alvaro Mancori
- Edited by: Cesare Ardolino
- Music by: Costantino Ferri
- Production company: Fontana Film
- Distributed by: Indipendenti Regionali
- Release date: 1952
- Running time: 92 minutes
- Country: Italy
- Language: Italian

The Mute of Portici (Italian: La muta di Portici) is a 1952 Italian historical melodrama film directed by Giorgio Ansoldi. It is based on a play by Eugène Scribe.

== Cast ==
- Flora Mariel as Lucia Maniello
- Doris Duranti as Elvira D'Herrera
- Paolo Carlini as Masaniello
- Ottavio Senoret as Alfonso
- Umberto Sacripante as La Spia
- Raf Pindi as Viceroy of Naples
- Paolo Dola as Cap. Perrone
- Maurizio Di Nardo
- Isarco Ravaioli
- Anna Maria Ferrero (uncredited)
- Marcello Mastroianni (uncredited)
- Jacques Sernas (uncredited)

== See also ==
- La muette de Portici (play)
- The Dumb Girl of Portici (1916)
- The Mute of Portici (1922)

== Bibliography ==
- Chiti, Roberto & Poppi, Roberto. Dizionario del cinema italiano: Dal 1945 al 1959. Gremese Editore, 1991.
