= Robert Letellier =

Literary critic (born 1953)

Robert Ignatius Letellier (born 1953, in Durban, South Africa) is a cultural historian and academic, specialising in the history of music, Romantic literature and the Bible. He teaches at the Maryvale Institute and the Institute of Continuing Education, University of Cambridge.

== Biography ==
Letellier has ten degrees in a range of subjects, including English, history, philosophy, and scripture. He has a Doctor of Philosophy (PhD) degree in English Romanticism from the University of Salzburg, and a Doctor of Sacred Theology (STD) degree in Scripture from the Pontifical Gregorian University. He teaches music, literature and cultural history at the Institute of Continuing Education, University of Cambridge.

Letellier has published more than one hundred articles and books on subjects including the Bible, eighteenth and nineteenth century novels, especially the works of Sir Walter Scott, and 19th-century music. He is particularly noted for scholarship on the life and works of the composer Giacomo Meyerbeer. Letellier's four-volume translation of the composer's diaries has been cited as "the most important work on the composer to be published in English to date". He has also published several studies of the composer's operas and other works which have played an important part in the revaluation of Meyerbeer, the most popular composer of the 19th century, whose works fell into almost complete neglect in the 20th but are now being rediscovered.

== Select bibliography ==
As editor and translator:

- Meyerbeer, Giacomo (1999–2004). The Diaries of Giacomo Meyerbeer (4 vols.). Translated by Letellier, Robert. Madison and London: Farliegh Dickinson University Press.

As author:

- The English Novel, 1660-1700: An Annotated Bibliography, Greenwood Publishing Group 1997. ISBN 978-0313303685
- The Operas of Giacomo Meyerbeer, Madison, New Jersey: Fairleigh Dickinson University Press 2006. ISBN 978-0-8386-4093-7.
- The Ballets of Ludwig Minkus, Cambridge Scholars Publishing 2008. ISBN 978-1847184238.
- An Introduction to the Dramatic Works of Giacomo Meyerbeer: Operas, Ballets, Cantatas, Plays, Routledge 2008. ISBN 978-0754660392
- Opera-Comique: A Sourcebook, Cambridge Scholars Publishing 2010. ISBN 978-1443821407.
- Daniel-François-Esprit Auber: The Man and His Music, Cambridge Scholars Publishing 2010. ISBN 978-1-4438-2597-9.
- Meyerbeer's Les Huguenots: An Evangel of Religion and Love, Cambridge Scholars Publishing 2014.ISBN 978-1-4438-5666-9.
- Operetta: A Sourcebook I and II, Cambridge Scholars Publishing 2015. ISBN 978-1443877084.
- The Bible in Music, Cambridge Scholars Publishing 2017. ISBN 978-1443873147.
- Giacomo Meyerbeer: A Critical Life and Iconography, Cambridge Scholars Publishing 2018. ISBN 978-1-5275-0396-0.
