= Germain Delavigne =

French playwright and librettist

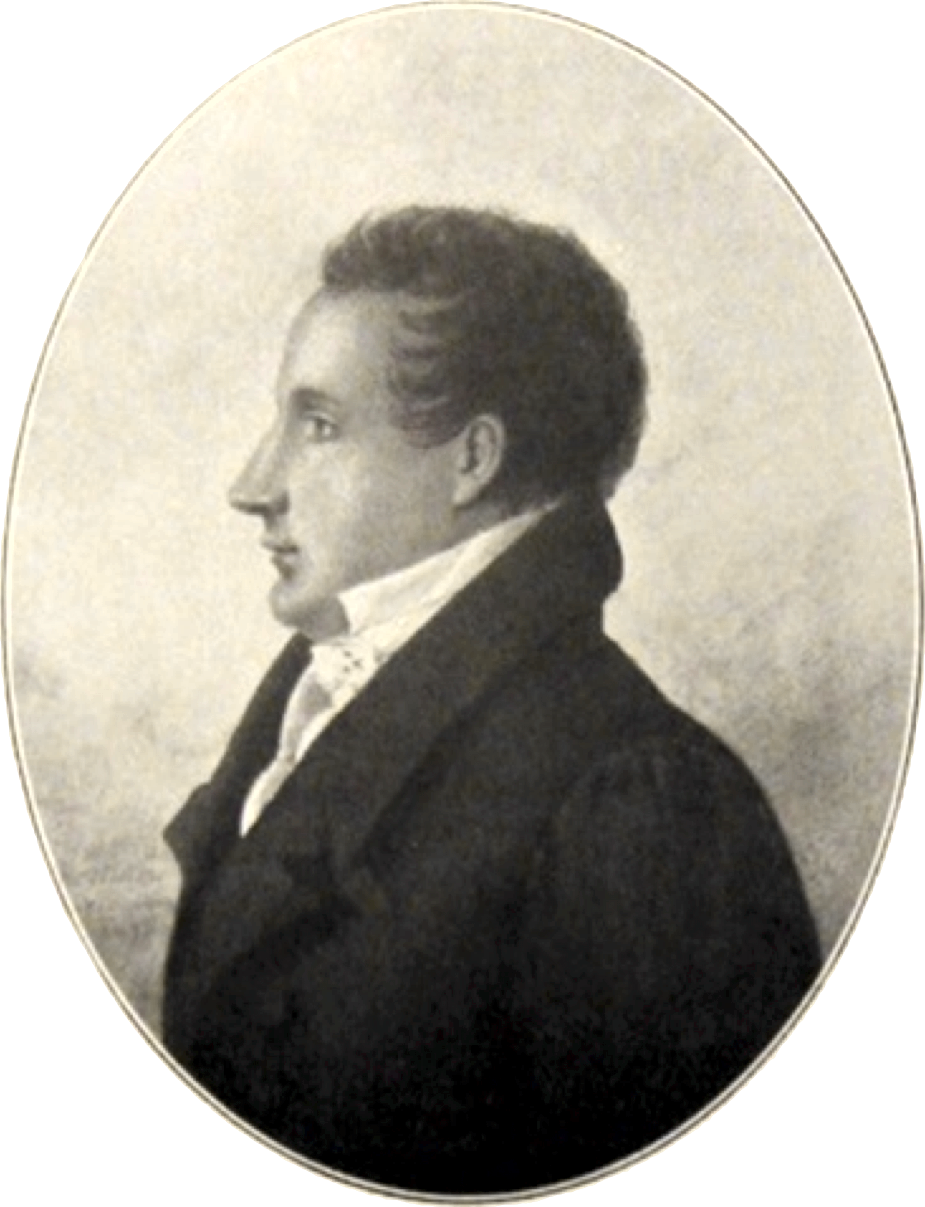
Delavigne by Hortense de Beauharnais

Louis Marie Germain Delavigne (1 February 1790 – 3 November 1868) was a French playwright and librettist.

Delavigne was born in Giverny to Louis-Augustin-Anselme Delavigne, a surveyor of the French royal forests, and his wife. He was the brother of Casimir Delavigne (1793–1843) who was also destined for a theatrical career.

A frequent collaborator of Eugène Scribe, Delavigne was involved in the creation of the libretti of two of the earliest grand operas, Daniel Auber's La muette de Portici (1828) and Giacomo Meyerbeer's Robert le diable (1831). Amongst his later libretti were those for Fromental Halévy's Charles VI (1843) (co-authored with his brother Casimir) and Charles Gounod's La nonne sanglante (1854).

Delavigne died at Montmorency, Val-d'Oise in 1868.
