= Daniel Auber =

French opera composer (1782–1871)

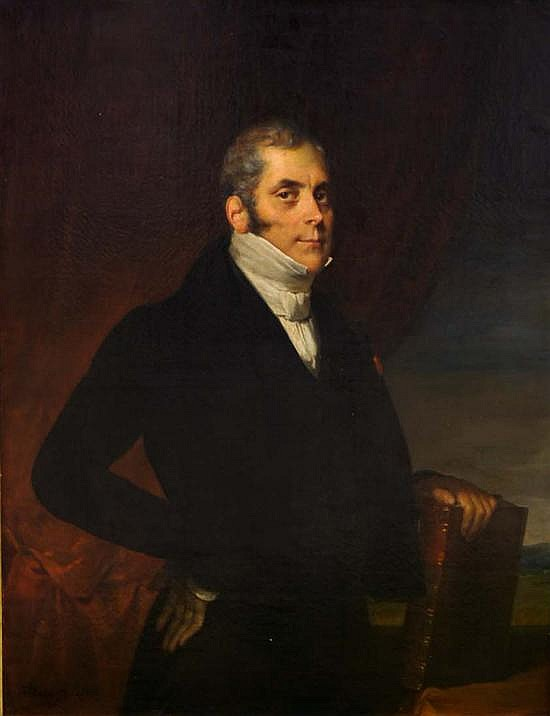
- Portrait of Auber by Hortense Haudebourt-Lescot, 1827
- Born: 29 January 1782; Caen, Normandy, France
- Died: 12 May 1871 (aged 89); Paris, France
- Occupations: Composer; Academic teacher
- Organizations: Paris Conservatory
- Works: List of operas

Daniel-François-Esprit Auber (French: [danjɛl fʁɑ̃swa ɛspʁi obɛːʁ]; 29 January 1782 – 12 May 1871) was a French Romantic composer and director of the Paris Conservatoire.

Born into an artistic family, Auber was at first an amateur composer before he took up writing operas professionally when the family's fortunes failed in 1820. He soon established a professional partnership with the librettist Eugène Scribe that lasted for 41 years and produced 39 operas, most of them commercial and critical successes. He is mostly associated with opéra-comique and composed 35 works in that genre. With Scribe he wrote the first French grand opera, La Muette de Portici (The Dumb Woman of Portici) in 1828, which paved the way for the large-scale works of Giacomo Meyerbeer.

Auber held two important official musical posts. From 1842 to 1871 he was director of France's premier music academy, the Paris Conservatoire, which he expanded and modernised. From 1852 until the fall of the Second Empire in 1870 he was director of the imperial chapel in the Louvre, for which he wrote a substantial number of liturgical works and other religious music.

A devotee of Paris, Auber refused to leave the city when the Franco Prussian War led to the siege of Paris and the subsequent rise of the Paris Commune. He died in his house in Paris, aged 89, shortly before the French government regained control of the capital.

== Life and career ==
=== Early years ===
Auber's father, c. 1806

Auber was born on 29 January 1782 in Caen in Normandy, where his mother was visiting. The family was of Norman extraction but was based in Paris. Auber's grandfather had been "peintre du Roi" – the king's painter – responsible for sculpting and gilding the royal coaches, and Auber's father, Jean-Baptiste Daniel, was an officer of the royal hunt, based at the "petites écuries du Roi" – the king's small stables – in the Faubourg Saint-Denis in Paris. He and his wife, Françoise Adelaïde Esprit, née Vincent, had three sons and a daughter. When Auber was seven the French Revolution began, and his father had to find another occupation to allow him to go on providing for his family. He set up as a publisher, and opened a print shop in the rue Saint-Lazare, where he survived the Reign of Terror and prospered under the Directory and the Consulate. He had a salon, attended by artists of all kinds, where the young Auber sometimes performed: he was, by his teens, an accomplished violinist, pianist and singer.

Although his father encouraged his musical talent, Auber expected to go into the family's print-selling business, and after the Treaty of Amiens (1802) ended the war between France and Britain he went to London to study commerce and learn English. In Grove's Dictionary of Music and Musicians, Charles Schneider writes that Auber evidently had some success in London as a performer and as a composer. An earlier biographer, Charles Malherbe, writes that although Auber did not gain any great insight into trade and finance during his sixteen months in London, he admired and emulated British reserve and understatement, which suited his own innate modesty. His shyness became well known. He never appeared before the public as a conductor, and throughout his career he was too nervous to attend his own first nights. (Note: Auber's biographer Robert Letellier believes this generally held view of Auber to be only partly correct, commenting that in his maturity Auber had a confident and easy social manner.) He never married.

=== Return to Paris ===
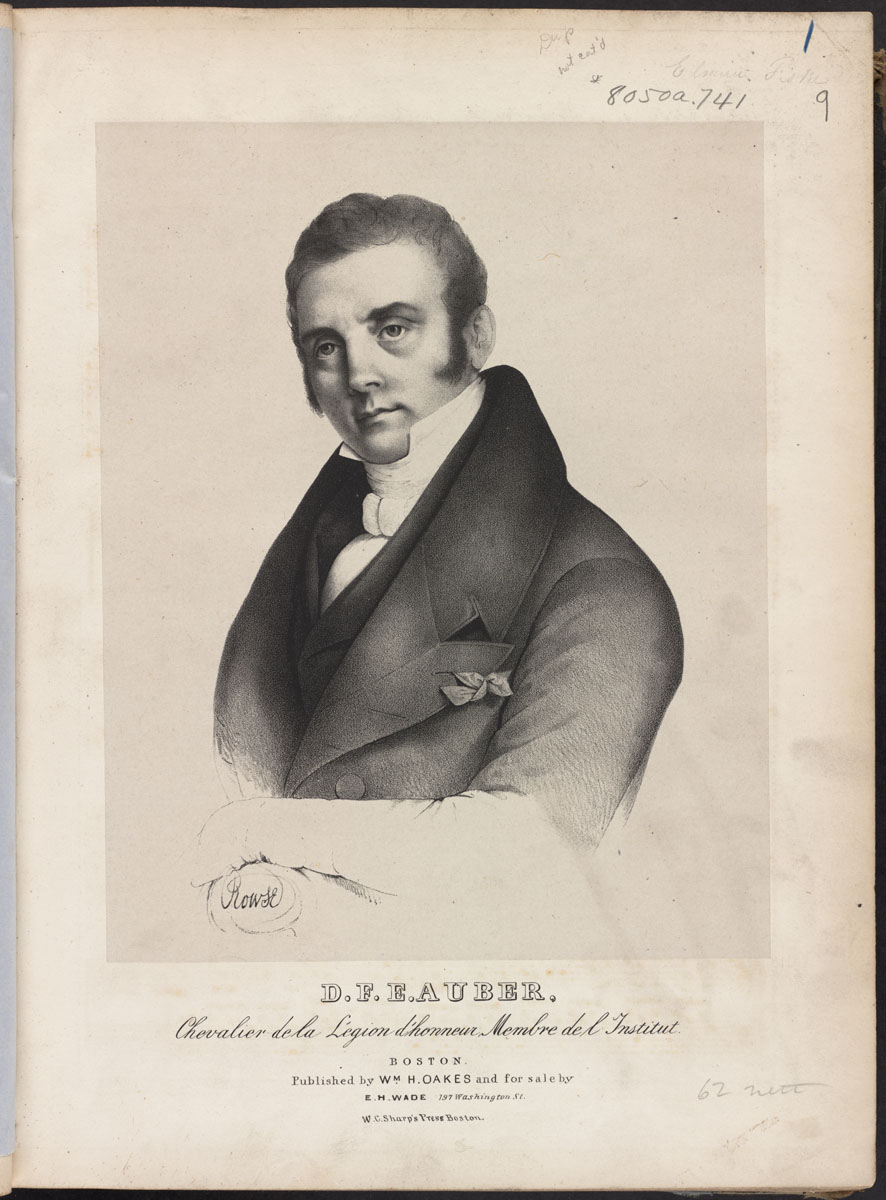
Auber, c. 1830

In 1803 the fragile peace between France and Britain ended; the Napoleonic Wars began, and Auber left London for Paris, where he remained for the rest of his life. There, he was admitted to the Société académique des Enfants d'Apollon, a prestigious association of musicians and music-loving painters, of which his father had been a member since 1784. Among Auber's compositions from this period were five cello concertos premiered by the soloist Lamare, in whose name at least three of them were originally published, although their real authorship soon emerged. The praise given to Auber's violin concerto (1808) encouraged him to undertake a new setting of an old comic opera, Julie, for an amateur society in 1811. The orchestra consisted of two violins, two violas, cello, and double-bass, but Auber made effective use of the small forces, and the piece was well received. Luigi Cherubini, the dominant figure in Parisian operatic circles, was in the audience, and recognising the powerful though untrained talent of the young composer, he took him as a private pupil.

Accounts differ about Auber's first professionally-staged opera, Le Séjour militaire (1813). Some older sources state that it had an "unfavourable reception", and was "a failure". Schneider (2001) writes that it had "a satisfactory 16 performances, and was revived in 1826 and staged in the provinces". Schneider adds that for the next seven years, Auber lived a carefree life, until a sharp decline in the Aubers' financial circumstances and the death of his father in 1820 obliged him to secure an income to support the family. He devoted himself to composition, particularly of operas. La bergère châtelaine (1820) and Emma (1821), to librettos by Eugène de Planard, did well both in France and in Germany.

=== Operatic success ===
In 1822 Auber began a collaboration with the librettist Eugène Scribe that lasted for 41 years and produced 39 operas. Auber's biographer Robert Letellier writes that the names of Scribe and Auber became as linked in French minds as those of Gilbert and Sullivan later were in British ones. The partners' first collaboration was Leicester, ou Le château de Kenilworth, a three-act opéra comique, with a plot derived by Scribe, in collaboration with Mélesville, from Walter Scott's historical romance Kenilworth. (Note: Scribe frequently wrote his librettos in collaboration with other writers. For Auber he worked with, among others, X. B. Saintine, E.-J.-E. Mazères and Jules-Henri Vernoy de Saint-Georges as well as Mélesville and Germain Delavigne.) It was given by the Opéra-Comique company at the Salle Feydeau in January 1823 with Antoine Ponchard and Antoinette Lemonnier in the leading roles, and received 60 performances over the next five seasons. Schneider writes of the collaboration:

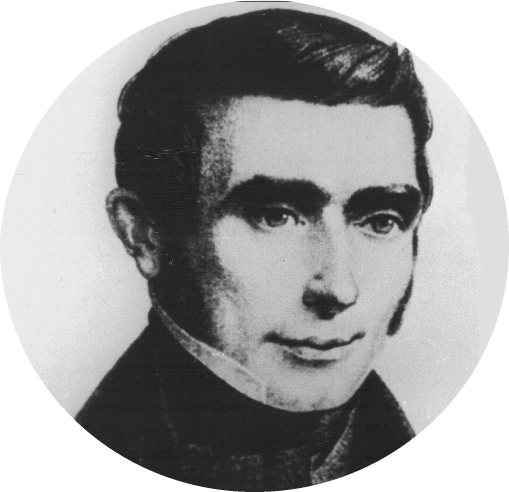
Eugène Scribe, Auber's principal librettist from 1822 to 1860

Scribe and Auber became the leading exponents of opéra comique in France, enjoying success in the German-speaking states, Denmark and England as well – reflected in the numbers of vocal scores, piano arrangements and translations of the librettos.

During the rest of the 1820s Auber's collaborations with Scribe were mostly successful, with long runs by the standards of the day. By contrast, his only opera without Scribe from this period ran for seven performances. (Note: Vendôme en Espagne, with words by Adolphe-Simonis Empis and Edouard Mennechet and music co-written with Ferdinand Hérold, was given at the Paris Opéra at the Salle Le Peletier in 1823.) By 1825 Auber was eminent enough in his profession to be made a chevalier of the Legion of Honour by the government of Charles X. (Note: He was promoted successively within the order to officier (1835), commandeur (1847) and grand officier (1861).)

Although most of Auber's operas from this period were in the established genre of opéra comique – works with spoken dialogue, usually in three acts – in 1825 he wrote the first French grand opera, La Muette de Portici, a five-act piece, with extensive ballet numbers, and recitative instead of spoken dialogue. The original libretto was by Germain Delavigne, adapted and revised by Scribe. After the premiere at the Paris Opéra in February 1828, productions opened in London in May 1829 and New York in November of the same year. By 1882 the piece had been given more than 500 times in Paris, and was performed in translated versions throughout Europe. A spectacular ballet, Masaniello, with the same story, using Auber's music, was popular in London in the later 1820s. Schneider writes that Auber consolidated his international reputation with La Fiancée (1829) and Fra Diavolo (1830), both with Scribe.

=== Institut and Conservatoire ===
Le Cheval de bronze, 1835

In 1829 Auber was elected as one of the six members of the Académie des Beaux-Arts of the Institut de France in succession to François-Joseph Gossec, joining the joint doyens, Cherubini and Jean-François Le Sueur, and their colleagues Henri Berton, François-Adrien Boieldieu and Charles Catel. During his 42 years as a member he was joined by composers including Adolphe Adam, Hector Berlioz, Charles Gounod and Ambroise Thomas. Under the government of King Louis-Philippe, Auber was appointed director of court concerts in 1839, and, when Cherubini retired in 1842, director of the Conservatoire. Schneider writes that in the latter post Auber's term of office was marked by:

special emphasis on vocal tuition, the separation of classes for male and female singers, provision of boarding accommodation for students, performances of opera in costume, and performances in the Conservatoire of music-theatre works by winners of the Prix de Rome.

In the 1830s Auber wrote twelve operas with Scribe, half of them opéras comiques, and half more serious works for the Opéra: Le Dieu et la bayadère (1830), Le Philtre (1831), Le Serment ou les Faux monnayeurs (1832), Gustave III ou le Bal masqué (1833), Le Cheval de bronze (1835) and Le Lac des fées (1839). (Note: Respectively, in English, The God and the Dancing Girl, The Potion, The Oath or the Counterfeiters, Gustave III or the Masked Ball, The Bronze Horse and the Fairy Lake.)

=== Later years ===
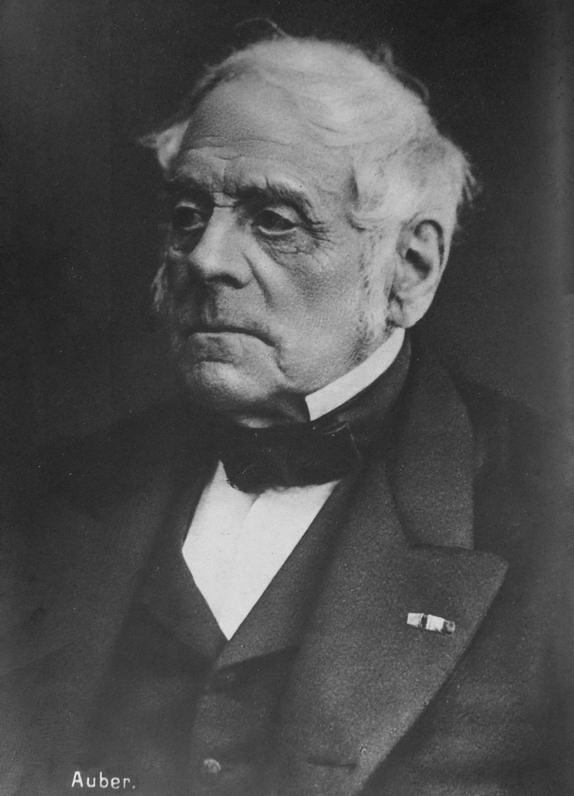
Auber by Nadar, late 1860s

Auber was a much-loved and conscientious director of the Conservatoire; he ran a less conservative regime than his predecessor, and introduced changes such as permitting applause at Conservatoire concerts, and giving members of the faculty more freedom in what they taught their students. He enlarged the composition, piano and orchestral instrument departments. His customary modesty extended to banning any of his works from being performed at the Conservatoire during the whole of his directorship. Several winners of the Prix de Rome – France's premier music prize – trained under him, including Georges Bizet, Ernest Guiraud, Théodore Dubois and Jules Massenet.

Auber's productivity as an opera composer slowed somewhat in the years after his appointment to the Conservatoire, but he completed 13 new operas between 1843 and 1869, including La part du diable (The Devil's Share, 1843), Haydée, ou Le secret (1847), L'enfant prodigue (The Prodigal Son. 1850), Manon Lescaut (1856 – 28 years before Massenet's version and 37 years before Puccini's), and his last collaboration with Scribe, La Circassienne (The Circassian Woman, 1861). After Scribe's death in 1861, Auber composed only two more operas, both with librettos by Adolphe d'Ennery and Eugène Cormon: Le premier jour de bonheur (The First Day of Happiness, 1868) and Rêve d'amour (Dream of Love, 1869).

Le premier jour de bonheur (1868)

Le premier jour de bonheur was a considerable success, and reviewers remarked on the freshness of the octogenarian composer's score: "Its music is, for the greater part, as fresh and sparkling as the best gems of Masaniello or The Crown Diamonds". It was an exceptional box-office success, given 167 times in Paris over the next few seasons and staged in Vienna, Berlin, Budapest and other European cities.

Under the Second Empire Auber was appointed director of the chapelle impériale by Napoleon III in 1852, and composed a considerable amount of music for the emperor's chapel in the Louvre. The musical forces there were substantial, the choir and orchestra comprising 40 musicians each. They performed under the direction of conductors from the Opéra, rather than the composer.

By the time of the Franco-Prussian War in 1870, Auber was old and ailing. He refused to leave Paris, and remained there during the siege of Paris and the subsequent rise of the Paris Commune. He resigned as director of the Conservatoire so that the building could be used as a hospital. He was briefly succeeded as director by Francisco Salvador-Daniel – appointed by the Communards and shot by the French government eleven days later – and more permanently by Ambroise Thomas, who held the post from 1871 to 1896.

Auber's health deteriorated and in May 1871 he took to his bed. Two friends – Thomas and his fellow composer Jean-Baptiste Weckerlin – took turns watching over him. In the early hours of 12 May he died at his house in the Rue Saint-Georges, aged 89. He was buried at the Père Lachaise cemetery.

== Music ==
=== Opera ===
La Muette de Portici, 1828

The total number of operas or other stage works by Auber given by various sources differs slightly, depending on whether collaborations with other composers are included. (Note: Auber collaborated with other composers on four stage works: Vendôme en Espagne (1823, with Ferdinand Hérold); Les trois genres (1824, with Adrien Boieldieu); La Marquise de Brinvilliers (1831, with Désiré-Alexandre Batton, Henri-Montan Berton, Felice Blangini, Boïeldieu, Michele Carafa, Luigi Cherubini and Ferdinando Paer); and Les premiers pas (1847, with Adolphe Adam, Carafa and Fromental Halévy).) Grove gives the total as 51, beginning with Julie in 1805 and ending with Rêve d'amour in 1869. Of these, 35 are opéras-comiques, with spoken dialogue. The genre includes some serious or even tragic plots, and some of Auber's such as Manon Lescaut are far from comic, but the majority of his opéras comiques are lighthearted.

The musicologist Hugh Macdonald writes of Auber, "With Adolphe Adam, he took on the mantle of Adrien Boieldieu and Ferdinand Hérold, and passed it on in turn to Ambroise Thomas and Jacques Offenbach". Macdonald judges the finest of the Auber-Scribe collaborations to be La Muette de Portici, "a grand opera that served as a model for the Meyerbeerian genre". He comments that despite the success of that work, Auber rarely essayed serious opera thereafter, confining himself in general to lighter operatic forms. The same writer concludes:

His melodies are attractive and popular, his orchestral textures piquant and simple. He never explored the harmonic avenues suggested in La Muette de Portici; he eschewed the sentimental. In his later years he reached his peak with Haydée, based on a story by Mérimée, and in Manon Lescaut, in which he anticipated the better-known settings of Prévost's novel by Massenet and Puccini.

Macdonald considers Fra Diavolo the most successful of Auber's opéras-comiques: "the music has a lively spring, with Auber's abundant melodic gift always in evidence". He adds that although the influence of Rossini is detectable, there are also chromatic touches that anticipate Smetana, who was composing 30 years after Auber. Letellier comments on Auber's sensitivity to the French language "celebrating with wit and piquancy the natural inflections and nuances of the text that Scribe could so effortlessly provide". In his later works, beginning with La Part du diable (1843), Auber developed a more lyrical manner and became less conservative harmonically. Letellier writes that within the confines of the opèra-comique genre Auber "deepened the scope of dramatic expressiveness".

The composer's operatic music is noted for the brilliance of coloratura passages for chorus as well as soloists, and the quantity of ensemble writing, particularly in the finales to acts. Letellier lists the vocal genres the Auber introduced into his scores: the ballad, the barcarolle, the bolero, the canon, the Bourbonnaise (laughing song), the chanson, the couplet, the galop, the nocturne, the round, the Tyrolienne and the waltz song. Auber's orchestration, which reflects the influence of his friend Rossini, became the model for French operatic compositions throughout the 19th century, including those of Bizet and Massenet. In the opéras-comiques Auber's orchestra generally consists of piccolo, two flutes, two oboes, two clarinets, two bassoons, four horns, two trumpets or cornets à pistons, trombones, timpani, snare drum, triangle, bass drum, cymbals, harp and strings.

=== Church music ===
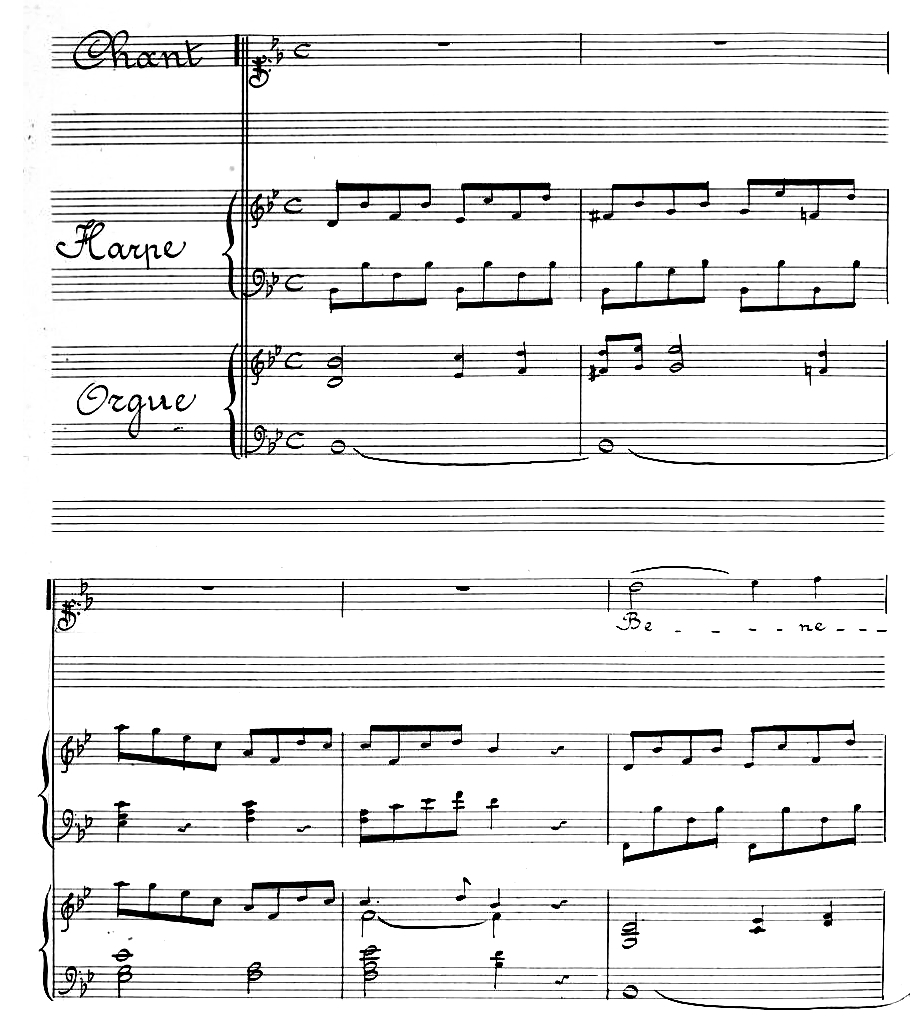
Opening of Benedictus No 2, for voice, harp and organ, c. 1855

Although Auber was and is best known for his operas, he wrote a substantial quantity of religious music, beginning with a Messe solennelle, for three solo voices and orchestra in 1812. Among his better-known religious pieces is a Dona nobis pacem (1828) which the composer reused in La Muette de Portici. Most of his liturgical pieces were written after his appointment as director of the chapelle impériale in 1852. The biographer Charles Malherbe notes that Auber's most productive years for religious music were 1854, 1858, 1859. 1860, 1863 and 1865 – years in which he composed no operas. Church works for the imperial chapel include a Pie Jesu, a Stabat Mater and numerous settings of sections of the Mass, including Kyries, Glorias, Benedictuses and Agnus Deis. Other religious works include 12 settings of O salutaris hostia, written between 1854 and 1870.

Most of the pieces Auber wrote for the imperial chapel are, in Schneider's words, "plain in style, homophonic and melody-led". Few have been published, but most survive in manuscript, often in two versions: one with orchestral accompaniment, and one with organ.

=== Other music ===
From the 1790s, Auber composed chamber and orchestral works, including a piano sonata, two string quartets, a piano trio, a piano quartet, a violin concerto, the five cello concertos written for Jacques-Michel Hurel de Lamare, and variations on a theme by Handel.

In addition to his liturgical music, Auber wrote a substantial number of secular choral or other vocal works, including cantatas to commemorate the wedding of Napoleon III and other events of imperial or national importance.

== Notes, references and sources ==
=== Sources ===
- Ferris, George T. (1893). Great Musical Composers: German, French and Italian. London: W. Scott. OCLC 1045619287.
- Goncourt, Edmond de; Goncourt, Jules de (1881). L'art du XVIIIme siècle. Troisième série. Paris: Charpentier. OCLC 1157129541.
- Hueffer, Francis (1912). "Auber, Daniel-François-Esprit". Grove's Dictionary of Music and Musicians (second ed.). London: Macmillan. OCLC 928682975.
- Hueffer, Francis; Marie Louise Pereya; Alfred Loewenberg (1954). "Auber, Daniel-François-Esprit". Grove's Dictionary of Music and Musicians (fifth ed.). London: Macmillan. OCLC 772793170.
- Letellier, Robert Ignatius (2010). Daniel-François-Esprit Auber: The Man and His Music. Newcastle: Cambridge Scholars. ISBN 978-1-4438-2563-4.
- Macdonald, Hugh (1995). "Daniel Auber". In Amanda Holden (ed.). The Penguin Opera Guide. London: Penguin. ISBN 978-0-14-051385-1.
- Malherbe, Charles (1910). Auber. Paris: Herni Laurens. OCLC 797004510.
- Martinet, André (1893). Histoire anecdotique du Conservatoire de musique et de déclamation. Paris: E. Kolb. OCLC 812174704.
