= La muette de Portici =

Opera by Daniel Auber

- Grand opera by Daniel Auber
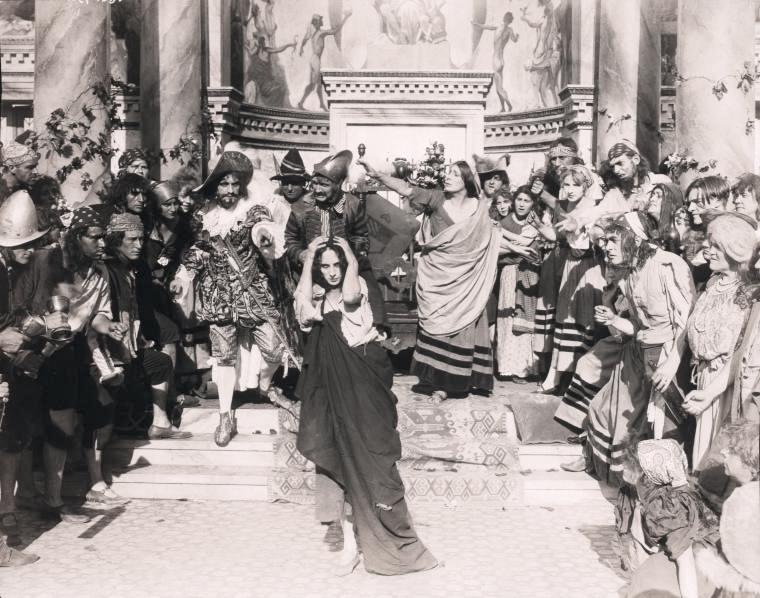
- Anna Pavlova in the title role in a silent film based on the opera
- Librettist: Germain Delavigne; Eugène Scribe
- Language: French
- Premiere: 29 February 1828; Salle Le Peletier, Paris

La muette de Portici (The Mute Girl of Portici, or The Dumb Girl of Portici), also called Masaniello (Italian pronunciation: [mazaˈnjɛllo]) in some versions, is an opera in five acts by Daniel Auber, with a libretto by Germain Delavigne, revised by Eugène Scribe.

The work has an important place in music history as the earliest French grand opera. It is also known for its alleged role in the Belgian Revolution of 1830.

== Background ==
The opera was first given at the Salle Le Peletier of the Paris Opéra on 29 February 1828. The role of Masaniello was taken by the famous tenor Adolphe Nourrit and Princess Elvire was sung by Laure Cinti-Damoreau. The dancer Lise Noblet played the mute title role, a part later taken by other dancers such as Marie Taglioni, Fanny Elssler and Pauline Leroux, also the actress Harriet Smithson (the future wife of Hector Berlioz). Alphonse was created by Alexis Dupont, who was Lise Noblet's brother-in-law. The conductor at the premiere was Henri Valentino.

La muette was innovative in several ways. First, it marked the introduction into opera of mime and gesture as an integral part of an opera plot (these aspects were already familiar to Parisian audiences from ballet and mélodrame). Additionally, the historic setting, liberal political implications, use of popular melodies, handling of large orchestra and chorus, and spectacular stage effects immediately marked this opera as different from preceding types, later earning it the title of the first of the genre of "grand opera". The journal Pandore commented after the premiere, "for a long time, enlightened critics have thought that alongside the old tragédie lyrique it was possible to have a more realistic and natural drama which might suit the dignity of this theatre." The new genre was consolidated by Rossini's Guillaume Tell (1829) and Meyerbeer's Robert le diable (1831).

Richard Wagner remarked, in his 1871 Reminiscences of Auber, that the opera "whose very representation had brought [revolutions] about, was recognised as an obvious precursor of the July Revolution, and seldom has an artistic product stood in closer connection with a world-event." La muette was revived in Paris immediately after the French July Revolution of 1830.

=== Belgian revolution ===
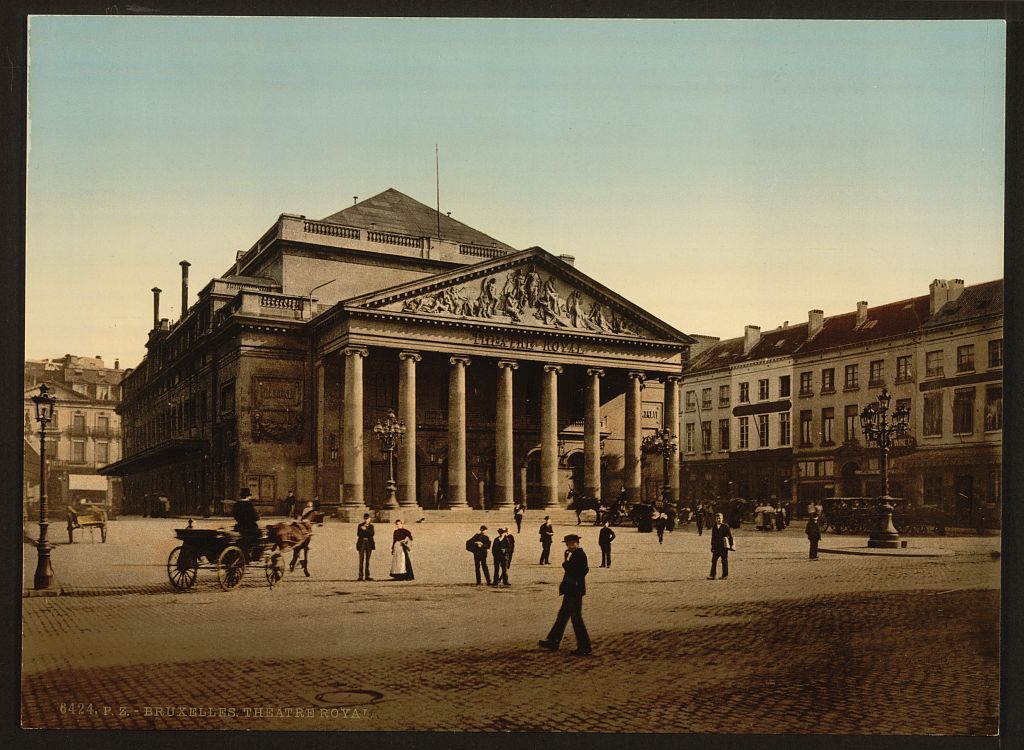
The Théâtre de la Monnaie (Muntschouwburg) where the performance of 25 August 1830 sparked riots leading to the Belgian Revolution

The opera was chosen for a performance at the Théâtre de la Monnaie in Brussels on 25 August 1830, as part of King William I's festival in celebration of the 15th year of his reign. The opera would cap the three-day festival of fireworks, feasts, and processions. William I had been present at the Brussels premiere of the opera in 1829, and it enjoyed several successful performances in the city. When nationalist disturbances occurred during a performance around the time of the July Revolution in Paris, the opera was temporarily banned. The ban was lifted for the 25 August performance.

The king's festival announcement was met with open plans for revolt. Posters were put up around Brussels that advertised, "Monday, the 23rd, fireworks; Tuesday, the 24th, illuminations; Wednesday, the 25th, revolution." However, the king's only concession to public safety was to cancel the fireworks and procession on the final night, which left Auber's opera as the last public event in the king's honor. Though the subject of the opera is revolution, its role in the riots may have been more a marriage of convenience because the rebels had pre-ordained the final day of the festival as the start of the Belgian Revolution.

Prior to the performance of Auber's opera, the Courrier des Pays-Bas newspaper issued a coded call for attendees to leave prior to the fifth act. There are some disagreements about when in the opera the exodus actually began, but the most commonly cited moment is the second act duet "Amour sacré de la patrie". One contemporary account describes what happened in the theater during the duet:

When Lafeuillade and Cassel began singing the celebrated duet. "Amour sacre de la patrie" enthusiasm exploded irresistibly and [the singers] found it necessary to start afresh in the midst of the cheering. Finally, when Masaniello (Lafeuillade) launched into his entreaty, the invocation Aux armes!, the public could no longer be restrained. They acclaimed aria and actor, they booed the fifth act in order to stop the performance, and the delirious crowd [hurled itself] out of the hall—into history. Welcomed by the other crowd which waited outside, it joined in the demonstrations which loosed the revolution of 1830.

== Roles ==
Role	Voice type	Premiere cast, 29 February 1828 (Conductor: Henri Valentino)
Masaniello, a Neapolitan fisherman	tenor	Adolphe Nourrit
Alphonse, son of the Count of Arcos, Viceroy of Naples	tenor	Alexis Dupont
Elvire, fiancée of Alphonse	soprano	Laure Cinti-Damoreau
Fenella, sister of Masaniello	dancer	Lise Noblet
Pietro, friend of Masaniello	bass	Henri-Bernard Dabadie
Borella, friend of Masaniello	bass	Alexandre Prévost
Moreno, friend of Masaniello	bass	Charles-Louis Pouilley
Lorenzo, confidant of Alphonse	tenor	Jean-Étienne-Auguste Massol
Selva, officer of the Viceroy	bass	Ferdinand Prévôt
Lady-in-waiting to Elvire	soprano	Anne Lorotte

== Synopsis ==
The opera is loosely based on the historical uprising of Masaniello against Spanish rule in Naples in 1647. The character of Fenella, the opera's eponymous heroine, was borrowed from Walter Scott's Peveril of the Peak, which features a deaf and dumb dwarf of the same name.

=== Act 1 ===
The square before a chapel

We witness the wedding of Alfonso, son of the Viceroy of Naples, with the Spanish Princess, Elvire. Alfonso, who has seduced and abandoned the mute Fenella, sister to the Neapolitan Masaniello, is tormented by doubts and remorse, fearing she has committed suicide. During the festival Fenella rushes in asking Elvire protection from Alfonso's father, who has kept her a prisoner for the past month. She has escaped from her prison and through gesture, narrates the story of her seduction, showing a scarf which Alfonso gave her. Elvire promises to protect her and proceeds to the altar, Fenella vainly trying to follow. In the chapel, Fenella recognizes her seducer as the bridegroom. When the newly married couple come out of the church, Elvire presents Fenella to her husband and Fenella reveals that he was her faithless lover. She flees, leaving Alfonso and Elvire in sorrow and despair.

=== Act 2 ===
On the beach

The Neapolitan fishermen, brooding over the tyranny of the Viceroy, begin to organize an uprising. Pietro, Masaniello's friend, has sought for Fenella in vain, but eventually she appears and confesses her wrongs. Masaniello is infuriated and swears to have revenge, but Fenella, who still loves Alfonso, does not mention his name. Then Masaniello calls the fishermen to arms and they swear perdition to the enemy of their country.

=== Act 3 ===
The Naples marketplace

The people's revolt go to and fro, selling and buying, all the while concealing their revolutionary purpose under a show of merriment and carelessness. Selva, the viceroy's body-guard, from whom Fenella had escaped, discovers her and attempts to re-arrest her. This arrest attempt is the signal for the revolution to openly revolt. They do, victoriously.

=== Act 4 ===
Masaniello's house

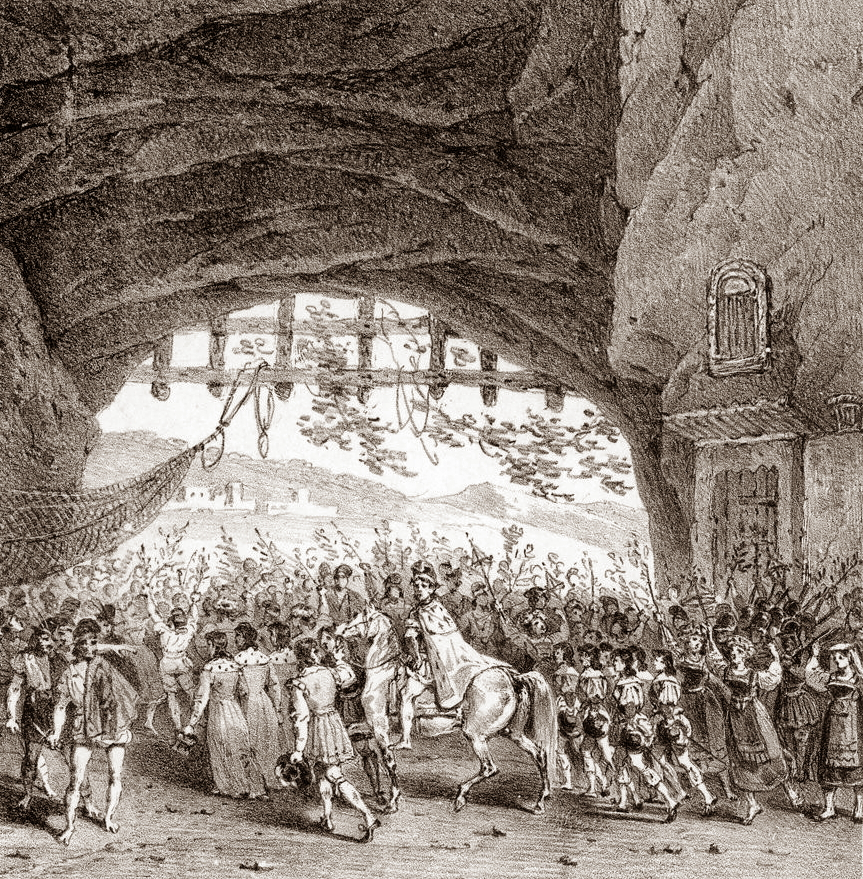
Act 4, scene 2 of the original production

Fenella comes to her brother's home and describes the horrors taking place in the town. The news fills his noble soul with sorrow and disgust. When Fenella retires to rest, Pietro enters with comrades and tries to excite Masaniello to further violence, but he only wants liberty and shrinks from murder and cruelties.

They tell him that Alfonso has escaped and that they are resolved to find and kill him. Fenella, who hears all, decides to save her unfaithful lover. At this moment Alfonso arrives at her door and begs for a hiding-place. He enters with Elvire, and Fenella, though at first disposed to avenge herself on her rival, pardons her for Alfonso's sake. Masaniello, reentering, assures Elvire and Alfonso of his protection and even when Pietro denounces Alfonso as the viceroy's son, holds his promise sacred. Pietro with his the other revolutionaries leave filled with rage and hate.

Meanwhile, Masaniello is presented with the royal crown and is proclaimed king of Naples by the magistrate of the city.

=== Act 5 ===
Before the Viceroy's palace

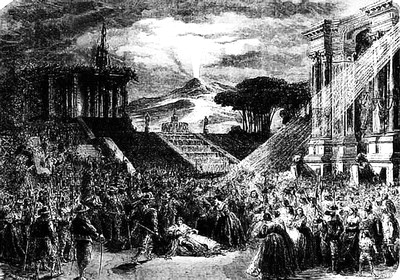
La muette de Portici, the eruption of the volcano, 1893 production

In a gathering of fishermen, Pietro confides to Moreno that he has administered poison to Masaniello, in order to punish him for his treason, and that the king will soon die. While he speaks, Borella rushes in to tell of fresh soldiers, marching against the people with Alfonso at their head. Knowing that only Masaniello can save them, the fishermen entreat him to take the command of them once more and Masaniello, though deadly ill and half mad, complies. The combat takes place while Vesuvius erupts. Masaniello dies in battle saving Elvire's life. Hearing this terrible news Fanella rushes to the terrace, and leaps to her death, while the fugitive noblemen take again possession of the city.

== Influence ==
La muette de Portici played a major role in establishing the genre of grand opera. Many of its elements – the five-act structure, the obligatory ballet sequence, the use of spectacular stage effects, the focus on romantic passions against a background of historical troubles – would become the standard features of the form for the rest of the 19th century. Grand opera would play a far more important role in the subsequent career of the librettist than that of the composer. Auber went on to write three more works in the genre: Le Dieu et la bayadère (1830), Gustave III (1833) and Le lac des fées (1839). But their fame would be eclipsed by the grand operas for which Scribe provided the libretti: Meyerbeer's Robert le diable (1831) and Les Huguenots (1836) and Halévy's La Juive (1835). Nevertheless, Auber's pioneering work caught the attention of the young Richard Wagner, who was eager to create a new form of music drama. He noted that in La muette, "arias and duets in the wonted sense were scarcely to be detected any more, and certainly, with the exception of a single prima-donna aria in the first act, did not strike one at all as such; in each instance it was the ensemble of the whole act that riveted attention and carried one away...".

This opera is the inspiration for Letitia Elizabeth Landon's poem "Fenella's Escape". published in The Keepsake, 1836.

The material has been used for several films: the American silent film The Dumb Girl of Portici (1916), the German silent film Die Stumme von Portici, the Italian film La muta di Portici (1952).

== Recordings and performances ==
- La muette de Portici: June Anderson, Alfredo Kraus, John Aler, Ensemble Choral Jean Laforge, Orchestre Philharmonique de Monte-Carlo, conducted by Thomas Fulton, recorded in September 1986 at the Salle Garnier in Monte Carlo (EMI). OCLC 605508655. 2 Hours 29 Mins.
- La muette de Portici Oscar de la Torre (tenor) – Alphonse, Angelina Ruzzafante (soprano) – Elvire, Angus Wood (tenor) – Lorenzo, Ulf Paulsen (baritone) – Selva, Anne Weinkauf (mezzo) – Eine Holdame, Diego Torre (tenor) – Masaniello, Wiard Witholt (bass) – Pietro, Kostadin Arguirov (baritone) – Borella, Stephan Biener (bass) – Moreno; Opernchor des Anhaltischen Theaters, Anhaltische Philharmonie/Anthony Hermus; recorded 24–26 May 2011, Großes Haus of the Anhaltisches Theater, Dessau, Germany CPO 777 694-2 [65:47 + 69:32]
