= Eugène Scribe =

French dramatist and librettist (1791–1861)

Scribe by Nadar

Augustin Eugène Scribe (French: [oɡystɛ̃ øʒɛn skʁib]; 24 December 1791 – 20 February 1861) was a French dramatist and librettist. He is known for writing "well-made plays" ("pièces bien faites"), a mainstay of popular theatre for over 100 years, and as the librettist of many of the most successful grand operas and opéras-comiques.

Born to a middle-class Parisian family, Scribe was intended for a legal career, but was drawn to the theatre, and began writing plays while still in his teens. His early years as a playwright were unsuccessful, but from 1815 onwards he prospered. Writing, usually with one or more collaborators, he produced several hundred stage works. He wrote to entertain the public rather than educate it. Many of his plays were written in a formulaic manner which aimed at neatness of plot and focus on dramatic incident rather than naturalism, depth of characterisation or intellectual substance. For this he was much criticised by intellectuals, but the "well-made play" remained established in the theatre in France and elsewhere long after his death.

In 1813 Scribe wrote his first opera libretto. From 1822 until his death he was closely associated with the composer Daniel Auber for whom he wrote or co-wrote 39 librettos, among them that for the first French grand opera, La Muette de Portici (1828). His second most frequent musical partner was Giacomo Meyerbeer, who took grand opera further and made it a dominant feature of French musical life. Among the other composers with whom Scribe worked were Adolphe Adam, Adrien Boieldieu, Gaetano Donizetti, Fromental Halévy, Jacques Offenbach and Giuseppe Verdi.

Scribe's librettos are still performed in opera houses around the world, and although few of his non-musical plays have been revived frequently in the 20th or 21st centuries, his influence on subsequent generations of playwrights in France and elsewhere was profound and lasting.

== Life and career ==
=== Early years ===
Scribe was born in Paris on 24 December 1791, at the family house in the Rue Saint-Denis near Les Halles. His father, a silk merchant, died while the boy was an infant, but left his widow comfortably off. Scribe was educated at the prestigious Collège Sainte-Barbe, where he was an outstanding pupil, winning the college's top prize in his final year and being ceremonially crowned with a laurel wreath at the Académie Française. His mother intended him to pursue a career in the legal profession, and sent him to study with Louis-Ferdinand Bonnet, a leading Parisian lawyer.

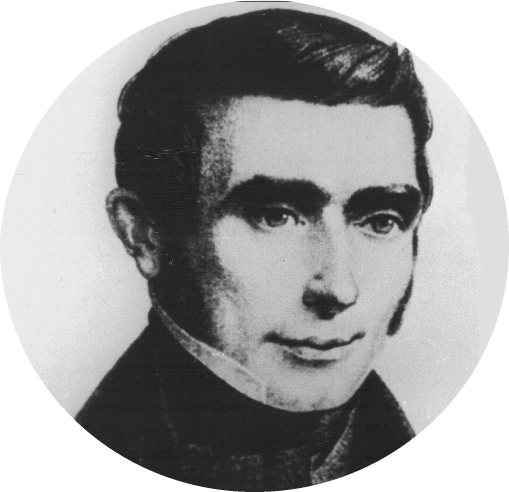
Scribe as a young man

Although he was conscientious in his studies, Scribe's ambition was to write for the theatre, and when his mother died in 1807 he turned from the law, and together with his former classmate Germain Delavigne he set his sights on a theatrical career. His first piece, a one-act vaudeville (Note: The vaudeville, a genre that originated in the middle ages as a satirical song, had evolved by the early 19th century into a play in verse with music, often popular songs borrowed for the purpose. Thereafter it split into two branches: opérettes, such as those by Offenbach, and, in the words of the historian Peter Meyer, "the vaudeville itself ... akin to what we would call slapstick farce, where movement was more important than character".) Le Prétendu par hasard, was produced anonymously at the Théâtre des Variétés in January 1810 and was a failure. Numerous other plays, written in collaboration with Delavigne and others, followed; but for the next five years Scribe earned little from the theatre and was reliant on his inheritance. He had modest successes with Les Derviches (1811) and L'Auberge, (1812), both written with Delavigne for the Théâtre du Vaudeville. In 1813 he wrote the first of three melodramas, of which the third, Les Frères invisibles, did reasonably well at the Théâtre de la Porte Saint-Martin. In the same year he wrote his first opera libretto, for Luc Guénée's opéra comique La Chambre à coucher.

Scribe's first substantial success came in 1815, with the comedy Une Nuit de la garde nationale (A Night at the National Guard), a collaboration with his friend Charles Delestre-Poirson. Over the next five years Scribe built a position as a dramatist, writing under his own name or pseudonyms, usually in collaboration with others. In 1820 Delestre-Poirson established the Théâtre du Gymnase, and opened on 23 December with Le Boulevard Bonne-Nouvelle by Scribe and two friends who had also abandoned law for the theatre, Baron Anne-Honoré-Joseph Duveyrier, who wrote under the pen name Mélesville, and Charles Moreau. Delestre-Poirson gave Scribe a remunerative contract that made him, in effect, the theatre's resident playwright, with the Gymnase having first call on his services.

=== 1820s ===
Between 1820 and 1830 Scribe wrote more than a hundred plays for the Gymnase, and librettos and plays for the Comédie-Française, the Opéra, the Opéra-Comique and seven other theatres. In 1822 he began a collaboration with the composer Daniel Auber that lasted for 41 years and produced 39 operas. Auber's biographer Robert Letellier writes that the names of Scribe and Auber became as linked in French minds as those of Gilbert and Sullivan later were in British ones. The partners' first collaboration was Leicester, ou Le château de Kenilworth, a three-act opéra comique, with a plot that Scribe, in collaboration with Mélesville, derived from Walter Scott's historical romance Kenilworth. As with his plays, Scribe customarily wrote his librettos in collaboration with other writers. For Auber he worked with, among others, X. B. Saintine, E.-J.-E. Mazères and Jules-Henri Vernoy de Saint-Georges as well as Mélesville and Delavigne. Letellier writes that "part of Scribe's genius lay in his careful selection of his collaborators". A story grew that Scribe would hire one man to write the narrative, a different one for the dialogue, a third for the jokes, a fourth for the lyrics, and so on. The story was apocryphal, (Note: Letellier explains that the story had its origins in a favourite game played at Scribe's dinner table where one person would think of an idea, another would plot it, a third create the dialogue, all with the aim of finishing the piece by the end of dinner.) but literary collaboration was a French tradition in which Scribe was thoroughly at home:

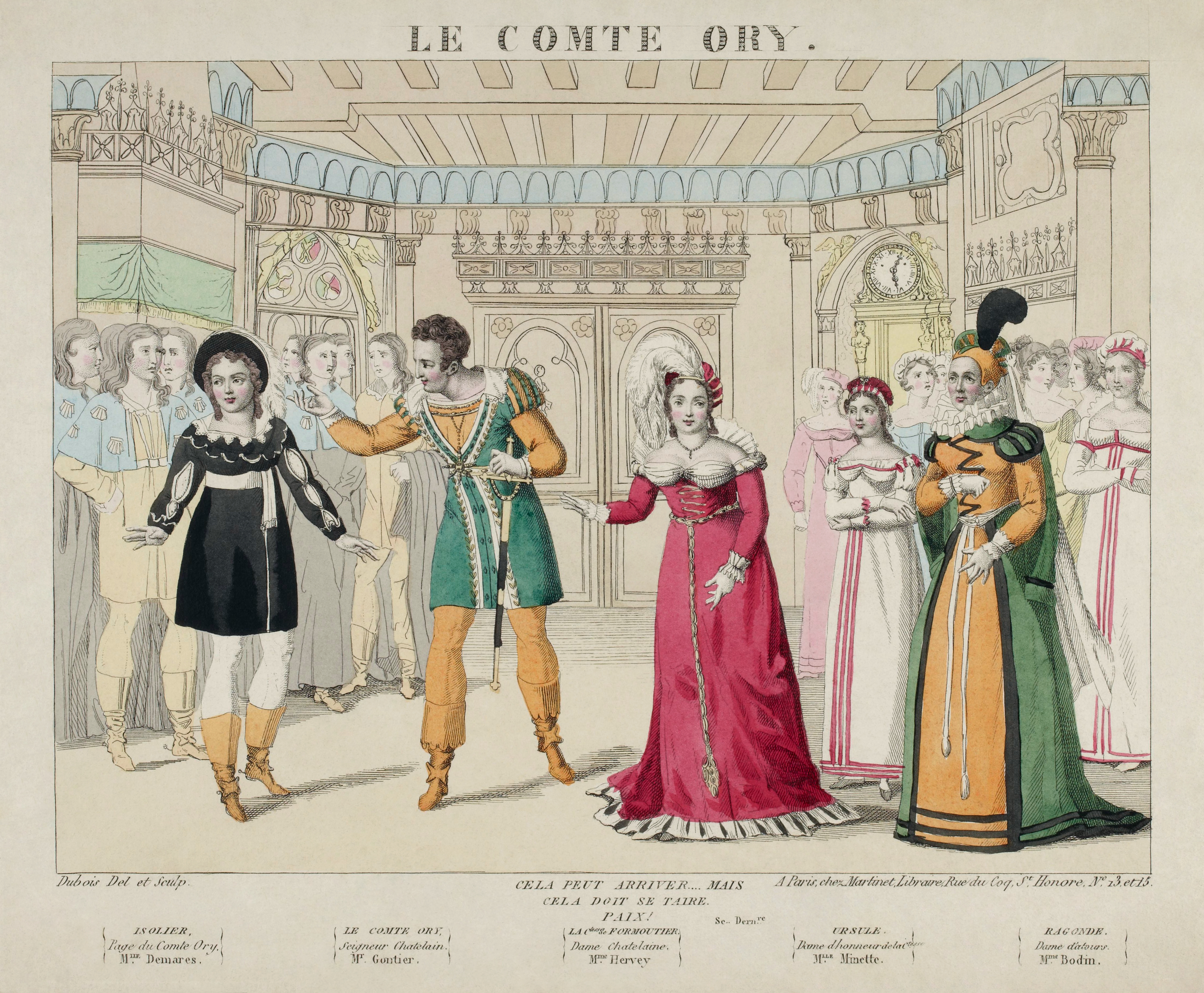
Le Comte Ory, 1828

His pleasure in cooperation was genuine, and evident in his generosity to co-authors, sharing not only revenues but glory with them. He was scrupulously honest in his dealings. Many unknown writers received cheques from him as "Payment for copyright in ideas" though they themselves were quite unaware of the part they had played in this creative process.

During his career Scribe worked with more than 60 co-authors, in addition to writing more than 130 stage works on his own. He wrote or co-wrote librettos for 48 composers. During the 1820s Scribe collaborated with Adrien Boieldieu on La Dame blanche (1825), a Romantic opera based on stories by Walter Scott. Scribe's libretto was one of the first to introduce the supernatural into an operatic plot. The piece was enormously popular, and reached its thousandth performance at the Opéra-Comique shortly after Scribe's death. In 1827 Scribe wrote the scenario for La Somnambule, a ballet with music by Ferdinand Hérold, for the Paris Opéra. It was a landmark – the first time the Opéra had presented a ballet with a scenario by a leading dramatist. Until then the storyline and staging of a ballet had been left to the in-house chef de danse. This was the precursor of the fusion of opera and ballet in the first French grand opera, given the following year – La Muette de Portici, with music by Auber and libretto by Scribe and Delavigne.

In 1828 Scribe collaborated with Gioachino Rossini on Le Comte Ory, an unusual undertaking as the words for about half the numbers had to be written to fit existing music, repurposed by Rossini from Il viaggio a Reims, a pièce d'occasion composed three years earlier. (Note: Although reusing operatic music was not uncommon – Rossini did it many times – Scribe and Delestre-Poirson had the particular problem of fitting French words to tunes written to be sung in Italian. Scribe had earlier provided French words for music written to be sung in German when he co-wrote the libretto for Robin des Bois (Robin Hood, 1824), very loosely based on Weber's Der Freischütz.) The opera was a success, and was seen in London within six months of the Paris premiere, and in New York in 1831. (Note: Scribe co-wrote the libretto with Delestre-Poirson, expanding a one-act vaudeville they had written in 1817 about the exploits of the libertine Count Ory, a real-life Don Juan.)

=== 1830s ===
In the 1830s Scribe's works were twice adapted by others for new operas that became well known. His scenario for La Somnambule was used by Felice Romani as the basis of Vincenzo Bellini's 1831 opera La sonnambula; his libretto for Auber's Le Philtre (1831) was adapted by Romani for Gaetano Donizetti's L'elisir d'amore (1832). The Opéra-Comique commissioned a grand opera, Robert le diable, from Scribe, Delavigne and Giacomo Meyerbeer. For reasons of musical politics the work was premiered by the Paris Opéra, at the Salle Le Peletier in 1831, after extensive re-writing. Within three years it reached 100 performances on the stage of the Opéra, and by 1835 it had been seen at 77 houses in ten different countries.

For the non-musical theatre, Scribe wrote Bertrand et Raton ou l'art de conspirer (The School for Politicians, 1830) a "serious" five-act comedy for the Comedie-Française. This began a series of historical or political comedies, which, as Pierre Larousse comments, have little to do with real politics and history, but which became the models of a new genre. The series continued with L'Ambitieux (1834), La Camaraderie (1836), Les Indépendants (1837), La Calomnie (1840) and Le Verre d'eau (1840), (Note: Respectively The Ambitious Person, Comradeship, The Independent People, Slander, and The Glass of Water.) all comedies in five acts, developing a more or less original theme. In 1836 Scribe was elected to the Académie Française, and in 1839, at the age of 48 he married. (Note: Little is known about Scribe's private life before his marriage. It is believed that by a liaison with a dancer he fathered an illegitimate son in 1838, Georges Coulon, later a prominent politician. In his will, Scribe left Coulon money – "un certaine fortune" – and some unfinished works.) His wife, whom he had known for several years, was the widow of a wine merchant. She worried about his tendency to overwork, and attempted, with only limited success, to get him to slow down. His working habits varied little throughout his life. He began work at five in the morning during the summer and at six in the winter, writing until noon. He spent the rest of the day planning new work, attending rehearsals of his plays or operas, and in the evening visiting friends or going to the theatre.

Scribe's country house at Séricourt

During the 1830s Scribe introduced social questions into his plays, although never losing sight of his principal purpose, which was to entertain. By this point in his career he had honed his skills as a dramatist and developed what became known as the "well-made play" – la pièce bien faite – characterised by concise plotting, compelling narrative and a largely standardised structure, with little emphasis on characterisation and intellectual ideas. In the words of one literary critic:

A Scribe play, long or short, is a masterpiece of plot construction. It is as artistically put together as a master watch; the smallest piece is perfectly in place, and the removal of any part would ruin the whole. Such a "well-made" play always displays fertility of invention, dexterity in the selection and arrangement of incidents, and careful planning. Everything is done with the greatest economy. Every character is essential to the action, every speech develops it. There is no time for verbal wit, no matter how clever, or for philosophical musing, no matter how enlightening. The action is all-important.

One of Scribe's key devices was the quiproquo, in which two or more characters interpret a word, a situation or a person's identity in different ways, all the time assuming that their interpretations are the same. This important feature of Scribe's "well-made plays" was raised to its greatest heights by Georges Feydeau later in the 19th century.

Scribe's earnings from his plays and librettos were considerable and he amassed a large fortune. He was a good businessman: commenting on a dispute over payment with Léon Pillet, the director of the Opéra, in 1841, he said he wanted to be paid for his librettos "according to what they bring in, that is to say, a great deal. The present director only wants to pay for them according to what they are worth, that is to say, very little". He bought a mansion in the fashionable Rue Olivier-Saint-Georges and two country houses. He was unobtrusively generous to deserving causes; among his benefactions was a fund for impoverished musicians and theatre people, into which he paid 13,000 francs (roughly €125,000 in 2015 values) a year.

=== Later years ===
Bataille de dames, 1851

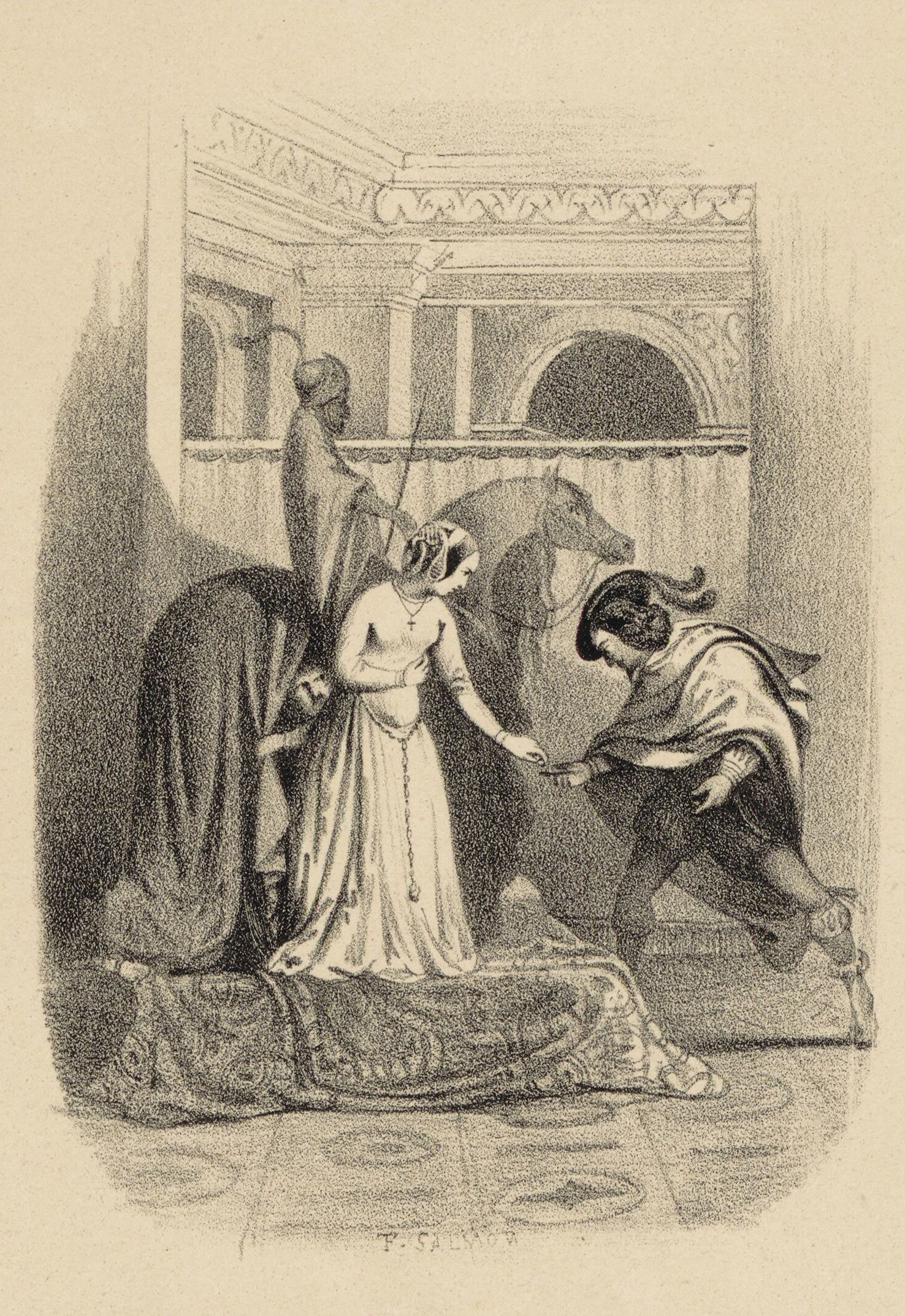
Les Diamants de la couronne, 1851

In Larousse's view the latter part of Scribe's career, from 1840 to 1861, was "just as full and as glorious as the first". Larousse singled out from the long list of Scribe's plays for the Théâtre Français: Une chaîne (1841), Le Puff (1848), Adrienne Lecouvreur (1849), Les Contes de la reine de Navarre (1850), Bataille de dames (1851) and La Czarine (1855). Of these, Bataille de dames – battle of the ladies – has been seen by literary critics including Brander Matthews and Stephen Stanton as among the best and most characteristic of Scribe's plays. It combines a story of a young man's successful attempts to escape official attempts to arrest him on a political charge with the depiction of the love two women have for him. It combines action, romance and a happy, albeit bitter-sweet, ending. Henrik Ibsen thought highly of the work, and drew on it in his own early writing; Bernard Shaw also drew on it, in his Arms and the Man.

Of Scribe's later librettos for the Opéra or the Opéra-comique, Larousse listed as among the most notable: Les Diamants de la couronne, La Part du diable and Haydée (with Auber, 1841, 1843 and 1847) and Le Prophète and L'Etoile du Nord (with Meyerbeer, 1849 and 1854). In 1855 Scribe had his only direct collaboration with Giuseppe Verdi. (The libretto for the latter's Un ballo in maschera (1859) was translated from Scribe's libretto for Auber's Gustave III, ou Le bal masqué (1833), but Scribe was not involved with the adaptation.) Scribe and Charles Duveyrier provided Verdi with the libretto for Les Vêpres siciliennes, premiered at the Opéra in June. It was well received; Hector Berlioz judged it a perfect mixture of French and Italian sensibilities, but it did not become a core part of the Verdian operatic repertoire.

Scribe was the subject of continual criticism from highbrow writers. Théophile Gautier and Théodore de Banville accused him of being "the ultimate in bourgeois art and philistinism, pleasing the masses and writing théâtre vide" – empty plays. Gautier asked, "How is it that an author devoid of poetry, lyricism, style, philosophy, truth and naturalness could have become the most fashionable dramatic writer of an era?" Scribe's answer to the question was:

The theatre-goer loves me because I take care always to win his trust; he is in on the secrets of the comedy; he has in his hands the threads that pull my characters along; he knows the surprises that I am going to spring, and he thinks he is managing them himself; in short, I take him for a collaborator; he feels he created the play with me, and naturally he applauds.

Scribe elaborated on his views in a speech to the Académie Française: "I do not think the comic author should be a historian: that is not his mission. I do not believe that even in Molière himself you can recover the history of our country". In a 2012 study, David Conway writes of Scribe's historical operas:

They exist in a parallel universe, in which colourful historical or geographical milieu display a handful of stereotypes who, as a consequence of some secret manoeuvrings in their own pasts and coincidences in the present, are forced to face some implausible crisis of choice or conscience, preferably accompanied by a simultaneous natural disaster or violent death (or both).

At the Académie, Scribe went on to give his views on the purpose of the theatre of his own time, maintaining that the public no longer went to the theatre to be instructed – as had been the theory in the 18th century – but to be diverted and entertained.

Scribe never retired. He was working on the libretto for Meyerbeer's last opera, L'Africaine, (Note: L'Africaine had the working title Vasco de Gama while Scribe was working on it.) when he died suddenly of a stroke on 20 February 1861, in his carriage on the way home from a meeting of the Société des auteurs et compositeurs dramatiques. (Note: Meyerbeer continued to work on the piece until shortly before his own death in May 1864 and it was given at the Opéra in April 1865.) He was buried in the Père Lachaise Cemetery.

== Works ==
See also Well-made play, Category: Libretti by Eugène Scribe and Category: Plays by Eugène Scribe

Estimates differ considerably of the number of stage works Scribe wrote or co-wrote. The published edition of his known works ran to 76 volumes, but it is inevitably incomplete, as he is known to have written pseudonymously and even anonymously. His total output of stage works is variously reckoned as between 300 and nearly 500. The known works include more than 120 librettos for 48 composers, collaborations in musical and non-musical theatre with more than 60 co-authors, and over 130 stage works written solo.

Among the many later playwrights drawing on Scribe's precepts for the well-made play were Alexandre Dumas fils, Victorien Sardou and Georges Feydeau in France, W. S. Gilbert, Oscar Wilde, Noël Coward and Alan Ayckbourn in Britain, and Lillian Hellman and Arthur Miller in the US.

=== Librettos ===
Among the best-known operas for which Scribe contributed to the libretto are:

- 1825: Boieldieu's La Dame blanche
- 1828: Auber's La Muette de Portici
- 1828: Rossini's Le Comte Ory
- 1830: Auber's Fra Diavolo
- 1831: Meyerbeer's Robert le diable
- 1831: Meyerbeer's Les Huguenots
- 1835: Halévy's La Juive
- 1843: Donizetti's Dom Sébastien
- 1849: Meyerbeer's Le Prophète
- 1855: Verdi's Les Vêpres siciliennes
- 1858: Offenbach's La chatte métamorphosée en femme
- 1860: Offenbach's Barkouf
- 1865: Meyerbeer's L'Africaine (posthumous)

Among the other composers with whom Scribe worked were Adolphe Adam, Michael Balfe, Luigi Cherubini, Charles Gounod, Ferdinand Hérold and Ambroise Thomas.

=== Film adaptations ===
There have been at least 30 films based on works by Scribe, from the 1916 silent The Dumb Girl of Portici, directed by Phillips Smalley and Lois Weber to A Glass of Water (1960), based on Le Verre d'eau.

== Notes, references and sources ==
=== Sources ===
- Carlson, Marvin (1984). Theories of the Theatre: A Historical and Critical Survey from the Greeks to the Present. Ithaca and London: Cornell University Press. ISBN 978-0-80-141678-1.
- Conway, David (2012). Jewry in Music: Entry to the Profession from the Enlightenment to Richard Wagner. Cambridge: Cambridge University Press. ISBN 978-1-10-701538-8.
- Conway, David (2021). "The 'Mandatory' Ballet of the Grand Opéra: Then and Now". In Isolde Schmid-Reiter; Aviel Cahn (eds.). Music Theatre in Motion: Reflections on Dance in Opera. Regensburg: ConBrio. ISBN 978-3-940768-96-4.
- Debré, Patrice (2018). Robert Debré: Une vocation française. Paris: Odile Jacob. ISBN 978-2-7381-4140-8.
- Gidel, Henry (1991). Georges Feydeau (in French). Paris: Flammarion. ISBN 978-2-08-066280-4.
- Gossett, Philip; Brauner, Patricia (1997). "Rossini". In Holden, Amanda (ed.). The Penguin Opera Guide. London: Penguin. ISBN 978-0-14-051385-1.
- Koon, Helene; Richard Switzer (1980). Eugène Scribe. Boston: Twayne. ISBN 978-0-80-576390-4.
- Lacombe, Hervé (2001). The Keys to French Opera in the Nineteenth Century. Berkeley and London: University of California Press. ISBN 978-0-52-021719-5.
- Larousse, Pierre (1875). Grand dictionnaire Universel du XIXe siècle. Vol. XIV. Paris: Grand dictionnaire Universel. OCLC 1170460660.
- Meyer, Peter (2003). "Introduction". Feydeau. London: Oberon. ISBN 978-1-84943-993-0.
- Osborne, Richard (2004). "Rossini's life". In Senici, Emanuele (ed.). The Cambridge Companion to Rossini. Cambridge: Cambridge University Press. ISBN 978-0-521-00195-3.
- Roberts, John H. (4 September 2003). "Meyerbeer: Le Prophéte and L'Africaine". The Cambridge Companion to Grand Opera. Cambridge: Cambridge University Press. ISBN 978-0-52-164683-3.
- Taylor, John Russell (1967). The Rise and Fall of the Well-Made Play. Oxford and New York: Routledge. ISBN 978-0-41-572333-6.
- Tolles, Winton (1940). Tom Taylor and the Victorian Drama. New York: Columbia University Press. OCLC 504217641.
