= Mock =

Mock may refer to:

== Names ==
- Mock (surname)
- Mock, or Duncan Stump, a member of the band Mock & Toof
- Mock, a character in the Japanese anime series Mock & Sweet

== Places ==
- Mock, Washington, a ghost town

== Imitations ==
- Mockery, imitation to express ridiculing derision
- Mock object, a programming object that mimics the behavior of real objects in controlled ways
- Mock trial, an act or imitation trial

== See also ==
- Mock - 1, a 1998 album by Mocking Shadows
- "Mock", a 2015 song by The Story So Far from The Story So Far
- Mock the Week, a British topical comedy panel show broadcast on BBC Two

=== Synonyms ===
- Fake (disambiguation)
- Imaginary (disambiguation)
- Insult
- Parody
- Pretending (disambiguation)
- Simulation

=== Derived terms ===
- Mockup
- Mocker (disambiguation)
- Mock orange (disambiguation)
- Mockery (disambiguation)
- Mock olive

=== Possible misspellings ===
- Mack (disambiguation)
- Meck (disambiguation)
- Mick (disambiguation)
- Moc (disambiguation)
- Muck (disambiguation)
