= Mockery (disambiguation) =

Mockery is a form of mocking derision.

Mockery may also refer to:

- Mockery (1912 film), an American short silent film
- Mockery (1927 film), an American film about the Russian Revolution

== See also ==
- Mock (disambiguation)
