= Pretenders =

Pretenders may refer to:

== Film ==
- Pretenders (2018 film), an American drama film
- The Pretenders (1916 film), a lost American silent film
- The Pretenders (1981 film), a Dutch film
- Pretenders (2026 film), a documentary about the band the Pretenders

== Literature ==
- Cemetery Girl – Book One: The Pretenders, a 2014 graphic novel by Charlaine Harris and Christopher Golden; the first installment in the Cemetery Girl series
- Pretenders, a 2008 novel by Lynda Williams; the third installment in the Okal Rel Universe series
- Pretenders, a 2013 novel by Lisi Harrison; the first installment in the Pretenders series
- The Pretenders (play) (Norwegian: Kongs-Emnerne), an 1863 play by Henrik Ibsen
- The Pretenders, a 1962 novel by Mary Howard
- The Pretenders (novel), a 1962 novel by F. Sionil José
- The Pretenders, a 1969 novel by Gwen Davis
- The Pretenders, a 1999 novel by Joan Wolf

== Music ==
- The Pretenders, a rock band
  - Pretenders (album), the 1979 debut album by the group

== Television ==
=== Episodes ===
- "Pretenders", Chancer series 1, episode 5 (1990)
- "Pretenders", Karelasyon episode 95 (2017)
- "Pretenders", Person of Interest season 4, episode 6 (2014)
- "Pretenders", The Eminence in Shadow season 1, episode 6 (2022)
- "Pretenders", The Equalizer (1985) season 1, episode 22 (1986)
- "The Pretenders", Beacon Hill episode 11 (1975)
- "The Pretenders", CBS Summer Playhouse season 2, episode 4 (1988)
- "The Pretenders", Dangwa episode 3 (2015)
- "The Pretenders", ITV Sunday Night Theatre season 2, episode 21 (1970)
- "The Pretenders", Kimba the White Lion episode 35 (1966)
- "The Pretenders", VH1's Legends season 2, episode 1 (1999)

=== Shows ===
- Pretenders (TV series), a 1972 British television series

== Other uses ==
- Pretenders, aspiring gods in the strategy game Dominions: Priests, Prophets and Pretenders and sequels

== See also ==
- Pretender (disambiguation)
