= Mock olive =

Mock olive is a common name for several plants and may refer to:

- Large mock-olive
- Privet mock olive
- Veined mock olive

== See also ==
- Mock (disambiguation)
- Olive (disambiguation)
