= Valentine d'Aubigny =

Opéra comique composed by Fromental Halévy

Valentine D'Aubigny
- Opéra comique by Fromental Halévy
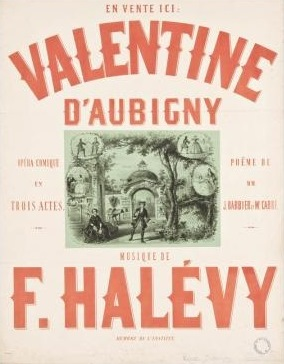
- Librettist: Jules Barbier and Michel Carré
- Premiere: 26 April 1856; Théâtre de l'Opéra-Comique, Paris

Valentine d'Aubigny is an opéra comique in three acts composed by Fromental Halévy to a libretto by Jules Barbier and Michel Carré. It premiered in Paris on 26 April 1856 at the Théâtre de l'Opéra-Comique (2° Salle Favart). The comic story is set in Fontainebleau and Paris at the beginning of the 18th century and revolves around mistaken identities and the machinations of the Chevalier de Boisrobert and Sylvia, an actress at the Théâtre-Italien, who try but ultimately fail to prevent the marriage of Gilbert de Mauléon and Valentine d'Aubigny.

== Background and reception ==
Valentine d'Aubigny was first and only time that Halévy used a libretto by Barbier and Carré, who went on to co-write several libretti for operas by other composers including Gounod and Ambroise Thomas. It was also the last opéra comique composed by Halévy. He completed only one more stage work before his death in 1862, the five-act grand opera La magicienne. Clément and Larousse wrote in their 1869 Dictionnaire lyrique that the "bizarre" plot of Valentine d'Aubigny detracted somewhat from the score which had several distinguished pieces and singled out Gilbert's aria "Comme deux oiseaux", Sylvia's bolero, and Chevalier Boisrobert's aria "Un amoureux".

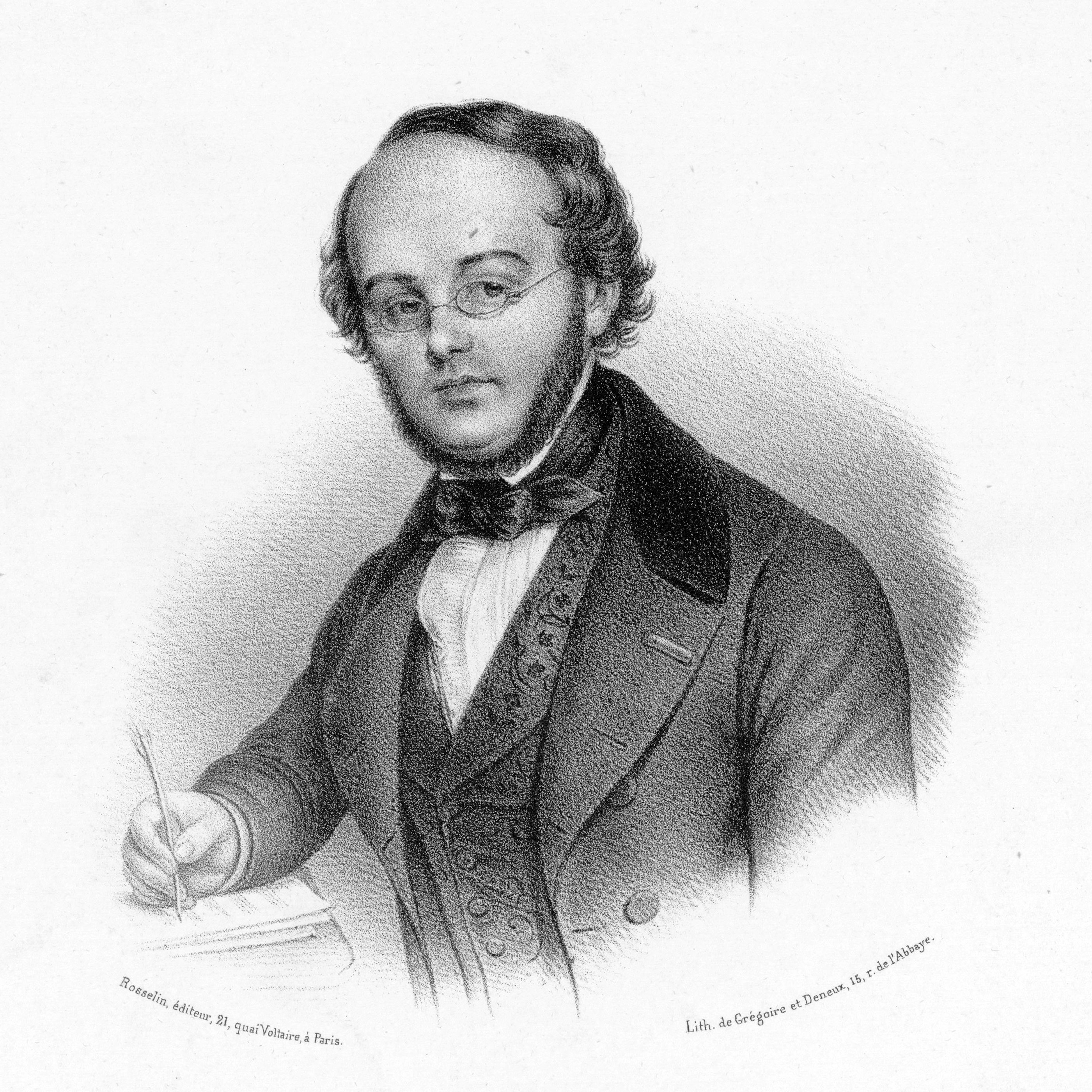
Halévy as a young man

Their assessment that Halévy's music for Valentine was superior to Barbier and Carré's libretto echoed that of the critic Paul Scudo in his review of the 1856 premiere for Revue des deux Mondes. He described the libretto as a "mediocre fable" and compared Barbier and Carré's work unfavorably to that of Eugène Scribe in the opéra comique genre. (Scribe had written the libretti for several of Halévy's earlier works in the genre, including Le shérif and Le nabab.) The assessments from other critics excerpted in the 8 May 1856 edition of Le Guide Musicale were much in the same vein. The critic from La Presse théâtrale described the libretto as a "monster" which defied all logic, but concluded:

Thank God, M. Halévy's music has enough power and charm to almost make us forget the nonsense of the piece.

Hector Berlioz wrote in the Journal des débats

The score is one of M. Halevy's best. It is written with care and a remarkable delicacy. We warmly applauded many pieces. There's nothing in there that is banal, petty, 'Parisian'. It is the music of a master.

The Parisian music publisher Jules Heinz brought out several adaptations and extracts from the score, including its overture and 13 of its arias arranged for solo voice and piano by Auguste Charlot. However, despite its success with the audience on the opening night when Halévy was called to the stage by their applause, the opera does not appear to have been revived after its initial run.

== Roles ==
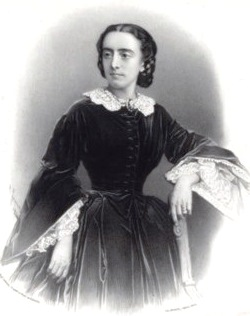
Caroline Duprez, who created the role of Valentine d'Aubigny

Role	Voice type	Premiere cast, 26 April 1856
Gilbert de Mauléon	bass	Charles-Amable Battaille
Valentine d'Aubigny	soprano	Caroline Duprez
Le Chevalier de Boisrobert	tenor	Toussaint-Eugène-Ernest Mocker
Sylvia, an actress at the Théâtre-Italien	mezzo-soprano	Caroline Lefebvre
Le Baron de Corisandre	bass	Elias Nathan
Marion, mistress of the inn at Fontainebleau	soprano	Zoé Bélia
Julie, Sylvia's maid		Mlle. Laserre
Actors and actresses of the Théâtre-Italien, servants

== Synopsis ==
Setting: Fontainebleau and Paris in the early 18th century

Gilbert de Mauléon, a handsome but naive young aristocrat from the Cévennes region, stops at an inn in Fontainebleau on his way to Paris. He plans to marry Valentine d'Aubigny whom he has not seen in the ten years since their engagement at the age of fifteen. He believes she is now an orphan living in Paris with her uncle. Unbeknownst to him, Valentine is also staying at the inn. Her uncle has died, and she is travelling from Paris to stay with other relatives.

At the inn, Gilbert encounters a half-crazed adventurer, the Chevalier de Boisrobert, who begins by ridiculing Gilbert's horse and then Gilbert himself. Gilbert challenges him to duel, but as the fight is about to begin, breakfast is served and Boisrobert suggests they postpone it until after they have had their coffee. Over breakfast, he recounts to Gilbert that he has run away from Paris to escape marrying Sylvia, a popular actress at the Théâtre-Italien, to whom he has unwisely become engaged. Sylvia had bet 1000 Louis with her comrades at the theatre that she would be married within the month and is now demanding that Boisrobert either marry her or pay up.

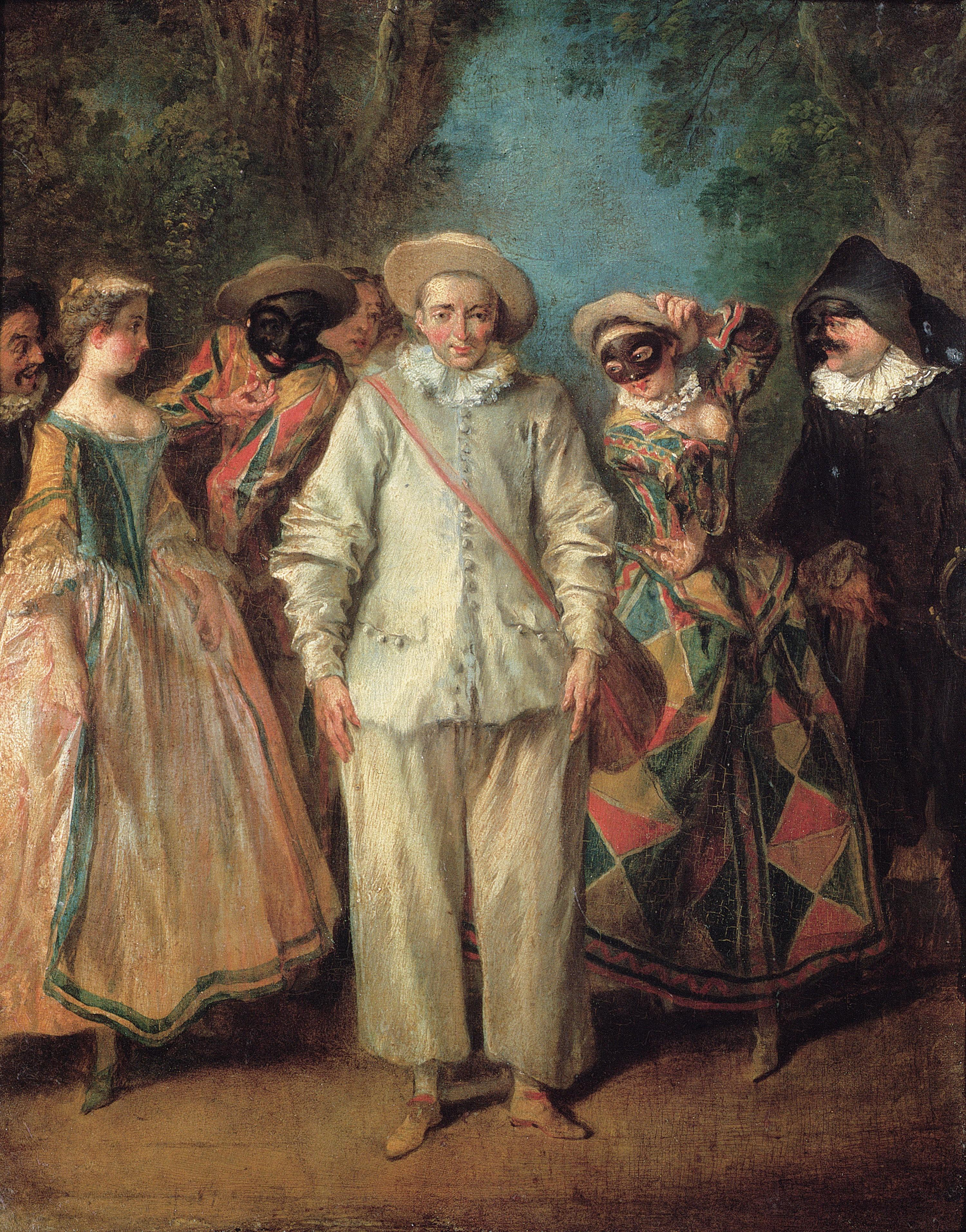
Early 18th-century depiction of actors in the Théâtre-Italien by Lancret

Meanwhile, ignorant of who she really is, Boisrobert had fallen in love with Valentine the previous day. When she appears at breakfast, he makes advances to her. Gilbert has no idea who she is either but rushes to her defense. As the men are about to draw swords, Sylvia arrives in pursuit of Boisrobert. He takes her aside and tells her Gilbert's story. Sylvia exclaims that she had bought the house of Valentine's uncle after his death. Boisrobert then proposes a plan. Sylvia is to pose as Valentine and marry Gilbert, thus winning her bet and letting Boisrobert off the hook. She agrees to the ruse, and the Baron de Corisandre agrees to pose as her uncle despite the fact that he is desperately in love with Sylvia himself. Boisrobert introduces Sylvia as Valentine to Gilbert who falls at her feet professing his undying love. Boisrobert, still ignorant of who she is, then suggests to the real Valentine that she become the paid companion of Sylvia and go to Paris with her. Amazed by this turn of events and determined to get to the bottom of it, Valentine agrees to Boisrobert's suggestion and tells him that her name is "Henriette".

After the first act, the action shifts to Paris where Sylvia has fallen in love with Gilbert. He too is in love with her primarily because of the wonderful letters she sends him daily. Unbeknownst to him, the letters are actually written by the real Valentine. He has a difficult time reconciling the "Valentine" of the letters with the gaiety and flirtatiousness of Sylvia, the woman he believes to be Valentine. She does not behave at all like a well-bred orphan recently bereft of her uncle. Sylvia eventually realizes that despite her love for him, she is not the right woman for Gilbert and decides to reveal the ruse. However, the real Valentine reveals it to Gilbert before Sylvia can, and she and Gilbert marry.

In the final scene, Gilbert and the real Valentine return to Sylvia's house, where Gilbert announces their marriage to her. He bids farewell to Sylvia and looks back at her one last time before leaving with Valentine. Baron de Corisandre rubs his hands in glee while Sylvia collapses in a chair weeping for her lost love. Boisrobert opens a door to the garden and tells Sylvia to listen. A group of actors from the theatre are heard singing:

We must not believe in long-lasting love! We must laugh and drink and sing all day!
