= Mocker =

Mocker or Mockers may refer to:

- The Mocker (comics), a comic book character
- The Mockers, a New Zealand pop band
- Los Mockers, a Uruguayan rock band
- Mocker Swallowtail butterfly (Papilio dardanus)
- Josef Mocker (1835–1899), Czech architect
- Toussaint-Eugène-Ernest Mocker (1811–1895), French opera singer and stage director
