= Caroline Duprez =

French soprano; daughter of tenor Gilbert Duprez (1832-1875)

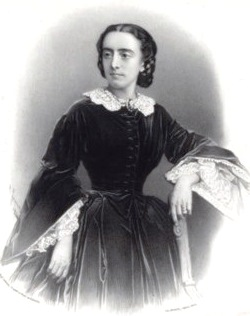
Lithograph by Auguste-Charles Lemoine based on a photograph by Léon Crémière

Caroline Duprez (10 April 1832 - 17 April 1875) was a French soprano. She was the daughter and pupil of the tenor Gilbert Duprez. À member of the troupe of the Opéra-Comique from 1852 to 1857, she premiered numerous roles in the opéras-comiques composed at that time by Auber, Meyerbeer, Massé and Halévy.

== Life ==
Born in Florence, Duprez was the daughter the famous French tenor Gilbert Duprez and Alexandrine Duperron. She studied with her father and began performing in Reims in 1850. She then joined the Comédie Italienne in Paris, sang in London in 1851 and then in Brussels in 1851-1852. She returned to Paris in 1852 to premiere the main role of her father's work, Joanita,(a revision of his earlier L'abime de la maladetta), at the Théâtre-Lyrique

For 5 years she was with the Opéra-Comique where she premiered the roles of Angela in Daniel-François-Esprit Auber's Marco Sparda (1852), Catherine in Meyerbeer's L'Étoile du nord (1854), Jenny Bell in the eponymous work by Auber (1855), Simone in Massé's Les Saisons (1855) and Halèvy's Valentine d'Aubigny (1856). Her voice, pure and agile, was particularly admired in its high register. She sang the roles of light soprano at the Paris Opera from 1860 to 1864.

After touring the provinces for two years, she created her last role at the Opéra-Comique in 1866 in Massé's Fior d'Aliza. Fragile in health and suffering from tuberculosis, she withdrew from the stage shortly afterwards and spent her last four years in Pau, alongside her husband, the violinist Amédée Van den Heuvel. She died there in 1875.

== Sources ==
- (in French) Andrew Gann, "Caroline Duprez", Dictionnaire de la musique en France au XIXe siècle under the direction of Joël-Marie Fauquet, Fayard, Paris, 2003, 1406 p. ISBN 2-213-59316-7
