= Alexandre Montfort =

French composer (1803–1856)

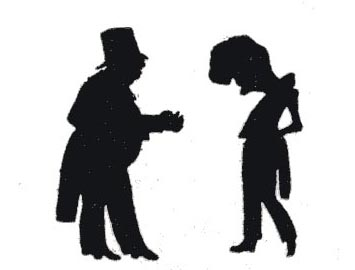
- Silhouette caricature of Alexandre Montfort (left) and Hector Berlioz (right) by Émile Signol (Note: This caricature was drawn in 1831 while Montfort, Berlioz and Signol were all living in the Villa Medici as winners of the Prix de Rome. Signol had won the 1830 Prix de Rome in painting.)
- Born: 12 May 1803; Paris, France
- Died: 13 February 1856 (aged 52); Paris, France
- Occupation: Classical composer

Alexandre Montfort (12 May 1803 – 13 February 1856) was a French classical composer. His works included instrumental music, art songs and six operas. He was awarded the Prix de Rome in composition in 1830.

== Life and career ==
Montfort was born in Paris, the son of a prominent antiquarian and numismatist. He studied at the Paris Conservatory under Fétis and Berton and in 1830 was awarded (jointly with Berlioz) the Prix de Rome in composition. (Note: As no Grand Prize had been awarded for the 1829 Prix de Rome in composition, the Académie des Beaux-Arts decided to award two Grand Prizes in 1830. Berlioz received the "First Grand Prize". Montfort received the "Second Grand Prize". For a detailed account of the 1830 competition see: Bloom, Peter (1981). "Berlioz and the "Prix de Rome" of 1830". Journal of the American Musicological Society, vol. 34, no. 2, pp. 279–304 (subscription required).) He stayed in Rome at the Villa Medici for two years and used the rest of his Prix de Rome bursary to travel and study in other parts of Italy and then in Germany. On his return to Paris in 1835 he made his debut as a composer with a series of instrumental overtures, piano music, and art songs.

Montfort's first stage work was La chatte metamorphosée en femme, a three-act ballet which premiered at the Paris Opéra on 16 October 1837 with Fanny Elssler in the title role. Berlioz, who had attended the premiere, described the music as displaying "a smooth, elegant and graceful talent." Five more stage works by Montfort were premiered between 1839 and 1855, all in the opéra comique genre. Of these, the most successful was the first, Polichinelle. Pieces from Polichinelle were also published separately and became popular as salon music.

In January 1843 Montfort married Alexandrine Dacheux in a ceremony at the Église Saint-Roch with Adolphe Adam as the organist. Alexandrine was the niece of François-Louis Crosnier, the director of the Théâtre de Opéra-Comique company from 1834 until 1845. As a wedding present, Eugène Scribe had promised a new libretto for Montfort. This was to become the three-act opéra comique La Charbonnière. Scribe had planned to finish the libretto by the time Montfort returned from his honeymoon, but did not even begin working on it until August of that year. According to Scribe La Charbonnière was based on an idea he and Mélesville had conceived twenty years earlier. He wrote to his friend Mahérault, "if ideas are like wine in bottles, then this one must now be excellent." It was not a view shared by the critics when the opera finally premiered in 1845.

After the relative failure of La Charbonnière and the change in management at the Opéra-Comique in 1845, Montfort produced no further stage works for the next eight years. During that period he supported himself by giving music lessons and working as a piano accompanist and organist. He returned to stage composition with his one-act L'Ombre d'Argentine in 1853. It was followed by another one-act opéra comique, Deucalion et Pyrrha, which premiered to critical success on 8 October 1855 with Ernest Mocker and Marie-Charlotte Lemercier in the title roles. It was to be his last work. Four months later, Montfort died in Paris from typhoid fever at the age of 52. His funeral was held at the Église de la Madeleine.

== Stage works ==
- La Chatte métamorphosée en femme, ballet in three acts, libretto by Charles Duveyrier, choreography by Jean Coralli, premiered Paris Opéra (Salle Le Peletier), 16 October 1837
- Polichinelle, opéra comique in one act, libretto by Eugène Scribe and Charles Duveyerier, premiered Théâtre de l'Opéra-Comique (Théâtre des Nouveautés), 14 June 1839
- La Jeunesse de Charles-Quint, opéra comique in three acts, libretto by Mélesville (Anne-Honoré-Joseph Duveyrier) and Charles Duveyrier, premiered Théâtre de l'Opéra-Comique (2° Salle Favart), 1 December 1841
- La Sainte-Cécile, opéra comique in three acts, libretto by Jacques-François Ancelot and Alexis Decomberousse, premiered Théâtre de l'Opéra-Comique (2° Salle Favart), 19 September 1844
- La Charbonnière, opéra comique in three acts, libretto by Eugène Scribe and Mélesville (Anne-Honoré-Joseph Duveyrier), premiered Théâtre de l'Opéra-Comique (2° Salle Favart), 13 October 1845
- L'Ombre d'Argentine, opéra comique in one act, libretto by Jean-François-Alfred Bayard and Edmond de Biéville, premiered Théâtre de l'Opéra-Comique (2° Salle Favart), 28 April 1853
- Deucalion et Pyrrha, opéra comique in one act, libretto by Michel Carré and Jules Barbier, premiered Théâtre de l'Opéra-Comique (2° Salle Favart), 8 October 1855
