= Pretender (disambiguation) =

A pretender is a claimant to an abolished throne or to a throne already occupied by somebody else.

Pretender or The Pretender may also refer to:

== Film and television ==
- The Pretender (film), a 1947 American crime film
- The Pretender (TV series), a 1996–2000 American television series
  - The Pretender 2001, a January 2001 television film
  - The Pretender: Island of the Haunted, a December 2001 television film
- The Pretender, a 2005 New Zealand TV series directed by Jonathan Brough

=== Television episodes ===
- "Pretender", Niña Niño episode 190 (2022)
- "The Pretender", Adventures in Paradise season 3, episode 7 (1961)
- "The Pretender", Code Lyoko season 3, episode 6 (2006)
- "The Pretender", Gunsmoke season 11, episode 10 (1965)
- "The Pretender", I Can See You season 3, episode 4 (2022)
- "The Pretender", Queen of Swords episode 18 (2001)
- "The Pretender", Robin of Sherwood series 3, episode 10 (1986)
- "The Pretender", The White Princess episode 4 (2017)

== Novels ==
- Pretender, a 1979 novel by Piers Anthony and Frances Hall
- Pretender (C. J. Cherryh novel), a 2006 novel set in C. J. Cherryh's Foreigner universe
- The Pretender: A Story of the Latin Quarter, a 1914 novel by Robert W. Service
- The Pretender (German: Der falsche Nero), a 1936 novel by Lion Feuchtwanger
- The Pretender, a 1991 novel by Louise Cooper; the second installment in the Chaos Gate trilogy
- The Pretender (Animorphs), a 1998 novel by K. A. Applegate; the 23th installment in the Animorphs series
- The Pretender, a 2002 novel by Jaclyn Reding; the first installment in The Highland Heroes series
- The Pretender, a 2003 novel by Celeste Bradley; the first installment in The Liar's Club series
- The Pretender, a. k. a. The Shadow King, a 2003 novel by Jane Stevenson; the first installment in the Astraea series
- The Pretender, a 2008 novel about literary forgery by David Belbin
- The Pretender: Rebirth, a 2013 novel by Steven Long Mitchell and Craig W. Van Sickle and the first of many novels based on the cult television series The Pretender

== Music ==
- The Pretender (album), a 1976 album by Jackson Browne
  - "The Pretender" (Jackson Browne song), a song from the album
- "The Pretender" (Foo Fighters song), 2007
- "The Pretender", a song by Datarock from Red, 2009
- "Pretender" (Official Hige Dandism song), 2019
- "Pretender" (Lillasyster song), 2021
- "Pretender", a song by Jane Remover from Frailty, 2021
- "Pretender", a song by Madonna from Like a Virgin, 1984
- "Pretender", a song by Miike Snow from Happy to You, 2012
- "Pretender", a song by Steve Aoki, Lil Yachty, and AJR from Neon Future III, 2018
  - "Pretender (acoustic)", acoustic version by AJR from The Click (Deluxe)

== Other uses ==
- Pretender (horse), a British Thoroughbred racehorse, winner of the 1869 Epsom Derby
- Pretender, a character concept introduced in 1988 in the Transformers: Generation 1 toyline

== See also ==
- Pretending (disambiguation)
- Pretenders (disambiguation)
- The Great Pretender (disambiguation)
- Antipope, a pretender to the papacy
