= The Great Pretender (disambiguation) =

"The Great Pretender" is a 1955 song written by Buck Ram and originally recorded by the Platters.

The Great Pretender may also refer to:

== Film ==
- Great Pretenders (film), a 1991 Hong Kong comedy directed by Ronny Yu
- The Great Pretender (film), a 2018 drama directed by Nathan Silver

== Television ==
=== Episodes ===
- "Freddie Mercury: The Great Pretender", Imagine series 23, episode 2 (2012)
- "Great Pretender", Prima Donnas season 1, episode 59 (2019)
- "Great Pretender", Someone to Watch Over Me episode 66 (2016)
- "Great Pretender", The Killer Bride season 1, episode 47 (2019)
- "Great Pretenders", WPC 56 season 1, episode 3 (2013)
- "Pororo the Great Pretender", Pororo the Little Penguin season 6, episode 11 (2016)
- "The Great Pretender", Automan episode 3 (1983)
- "The Great Pretender", Bear in the Big Blue House season 2, episode 9 (1998)
- "The Great Pretender", Casualty series 28, episode 26 (2014)
- "The Great Pretender", Getting Together episode 12 (1971)
- "The Great Pretender", Grey's Anatomy season 11, episode 12 (2015)
- "The Great Pretender", Hangin' with Mr. Cooper season 4, episode 10 (1995)
- "The Great Pretender", Head over Heels (British) episode 5 (1993)
- "The Great Pretender", Law & Order season 21, episode 9 (2022)
- "The Great Pretender", Out All Night episode 10 (1992)
- "The Great Pretender (I'll Become Who I Want to Be)", Snack Basue episode 12a (2024)
- "The Great Pretender", Sofia the First season 4, episode 15; part two of The Mystic Isles (2017)
- "The Great Pretender", Spin City season 1, episode 2 (1996)
- "The Great Pretender", The Boot Street Band season 2, episode 4 (1994)
- "The Great Pretenders", Casualty series 22, episode 35 (2008)
- "The Great Pretenders", Frontline (Australian) series 2, episode 12 (1995)
- "The Great Pretenders", The Inspectors season 1, episode 19 (2016)
- "The Proxy Pig and Great Pretenders", Designing Women season 4, episode 1 (1989)
- "Yes, I'm the Great Pretender", Davis Rules season 1, episode 6 (1991)

=== Shows ===
- The Great Pretender (game show), a 2007 British daytime game show
- Great Pretender (TV series), a 2020 Japanese anime series
- Great Pretenders, a 1999–2001 American music game show hosted by Wild Orchid

== Music ==
- The Great Pretender (Dolly Parton album), 1984
- The Great Pretender (Freddie Mercury album), 1992
- The Great Pretender (Lester Bowie album), 1981
- The Great Pretenders, an album by Mini Mansions, 2015
- "The Great Pretender", a song by Avatar from Avatar, 2009
- "The Great Pretender", a song by Brian Eno from Taking Tiger Mountain (By Strategy), 1974
- "The Great Pretender", a song by the Jon Frederik Band from Yu-Gi-Oh! The Movie: Pyramid of Light, 2004
- "The Great Pretender", a song by Pain from You Only Live Twice, 2011
- "The Great Pretender", a song by Paul Brady from True for You, 1983
- "Great Pretender", a song by Kasabian from Act III, 2026

== Literature ==
- All the Great Pretenders, a 1992 novel by Deborah Adams; the first installment in the Jesus Creek series
- Rex Zero, the Great Pretender, a 2010 novel by Tim Wynne-Jones; the third installment in the Rex Zero series
- The Great Pretender, a 2014 novel by Craig McDonald; the fourth installment in the Hector Lassiter series
- The Great Pretender: The Undercover Mission That Changed Our Understanding of Madness, a 2019 book by Susannah Cahalan
- The Great Pretenders, a 2019 novel by Laura Kalpakian

== See also ==
- The great imitator, a number of medical conditions that can look like other health problems
- Pretender (disambiguation)
