= Caroline Lefebvre =

French opera singer

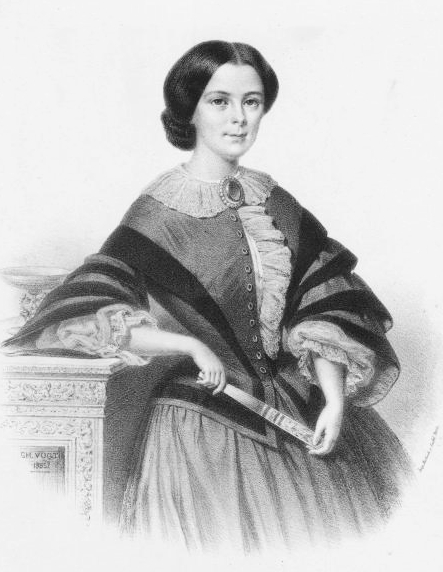
Portrait of Caroline Lefebvre

Constance-Caroline Lefebvre, sometimes spelled Lefèvre, (born 21 December 1828 in Paris, France; died 1905) was a French mezzo-soprano and soprano opera singer who started her career in 1849 and retired in 1866, mostly playing "dugazon" roles. She married her stage partner, baritone and composer Jean-Baptiste Faure, in 1859.

== Career ==
Lefebvre's early education took place in the Conservatoire de Paris under the guidance of David Banderali for her voice training and Théodore-François Moreau-Sainti for her opéra comique training, both in which she would win first prizes. Lefebvre debuted at the Opéra-Comique on 12 October 1849 as Carlo Broschi in La part du diable by Daniel Auber. Her following roles were often labeled as mezzo-soprano "dugazon" roles, including Le Toréador et Le Postillon de Lonjumeau by Adolphe Adam (Madeleine); Joconde and Jeannot et Colin by Nicolas Isouard (Jeannette); Joseph en Égypte by Étienne Méhul (Benjamin); Le Pré-aux-clercs by Ferdinand Hérold (Isabelle); Le Petit Chaperon rouge by François-Adrien Boieldieu (Rose d'amour); L'Épreuve villageoise (Denise) by André Grétry; Fra Diavolo (Zerline), La Sirène and Haydée by Daniel Auber; and especially Fromental Halévy's operas, Les Mousquetaires de la reine (Berthe de Simiane), La Dame de pique, Le Val d'Andorre, and La Fée aux roses.

Throughout the 1850s, Lefebvre's career was marked by the creation of many roles. In 1850, she created Palomita in La Chanteuse voilée by Victor Massé and another role in Les Porcherons by Albert Grisar; in 1852, she created La Croix de Marie by Louis-Aimé Maillard and Madelon by François Bazin, followed by the titular role in Colette by Justin Cadaux in 1853. In 1854, she created Prascovia in L'Étoile du Nord by Giacomo Meyerbeer and then Massé's Miss Fauvette, Grisar's Le Chien du jardinier, and Rosette in Adam's Le Housard de Berchini in 1855. She created three roles in operas by Ambroise Thomas: Le Songe d'une nuit d'été in 1850, Stella in Raymond ou le Secret de la reine in 1851, and Psyché in 1857.

== Personal life ==
Lefebvre was described as having "remarkable intelligence". She had one son with Faure, Maurice, born in 1862 in Paris.

== Bibliography ==
- Joël-Marie Fauquet, « Jean-Baptiste Faure » in Dictionnaire de la musique en France au XIX^{e} siècle, Fayard, Paris, 2003(ISBN 978-2-213-59316-6)
- François-Joseph Fétis, Arthur Pougin, Biographie universelle des musiciens et bibliographie générale de la musique : Supplément et complément, t.1, éd. Firmin Didot, Paris, 1881, p. 320
