= Charles-Amable Battaille =

French operatic bass (1822–1872)

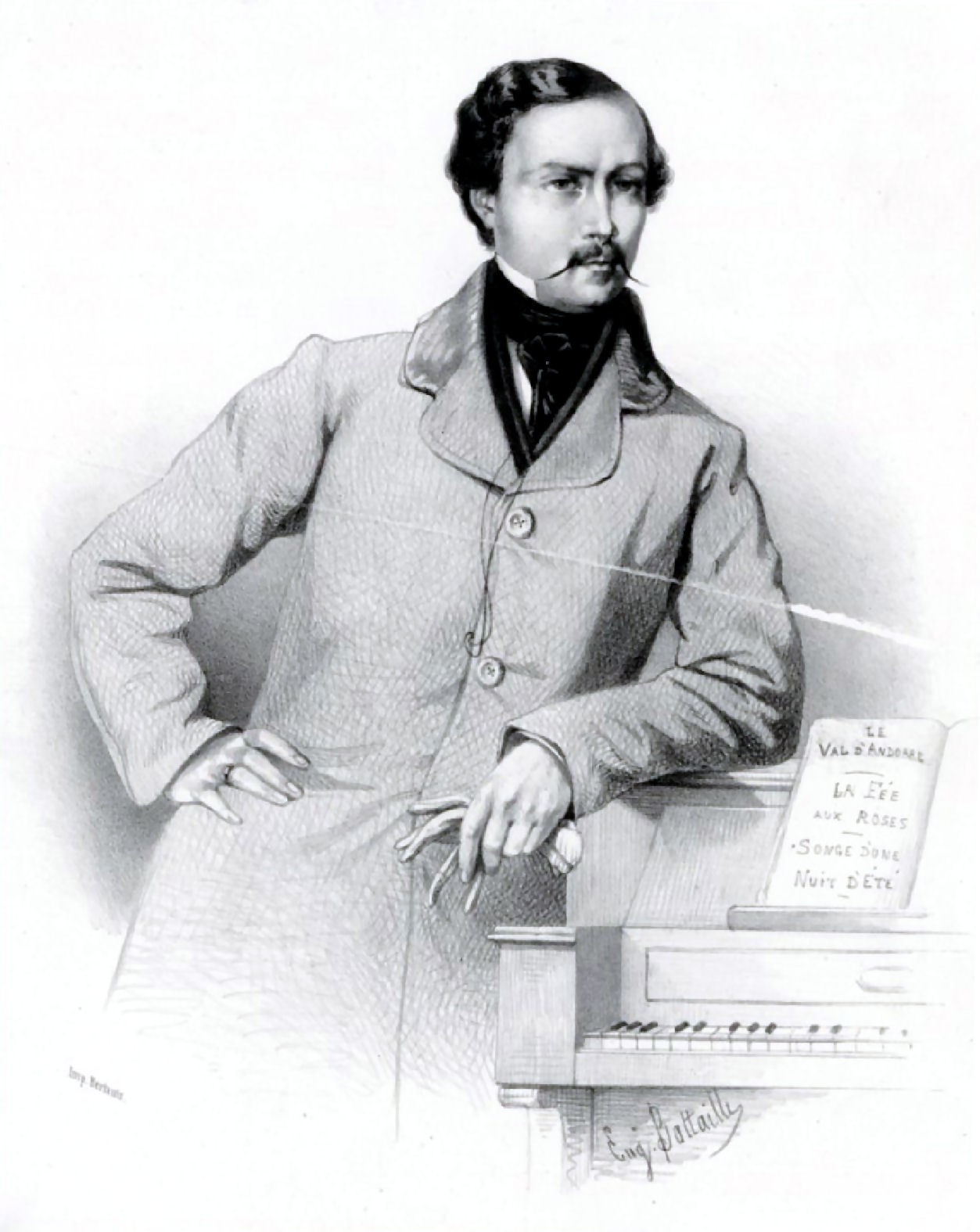
Charles-Amable Battaille in 1850.

Charles-Amable Battaille (30 September 1822 – 2 May 1872) was a French operatic bass. Appreciated both for his voice and his acting skills, he premiered the main bass roles for the works represented at the Opéra-Comique between 1848 and 1857, and is especially notable as the first singer of the role of Peter the Great in Meyerbeer's L'Étoile du nord (1854).

== Life ==
Born in Nantes, son of a doctor, he studied medicine in Caen where he was admitted as a doctor. He returned to Nantes, but decided to enter the Conservatoire de Paris in 1845 where he was a student of Manuel Garcia. He won first prizes in singing, opera and opéra comique in 1847 and made his début at the Opéra-Comique on 22 June 1848 in Donizetti's La Fille du régiment.

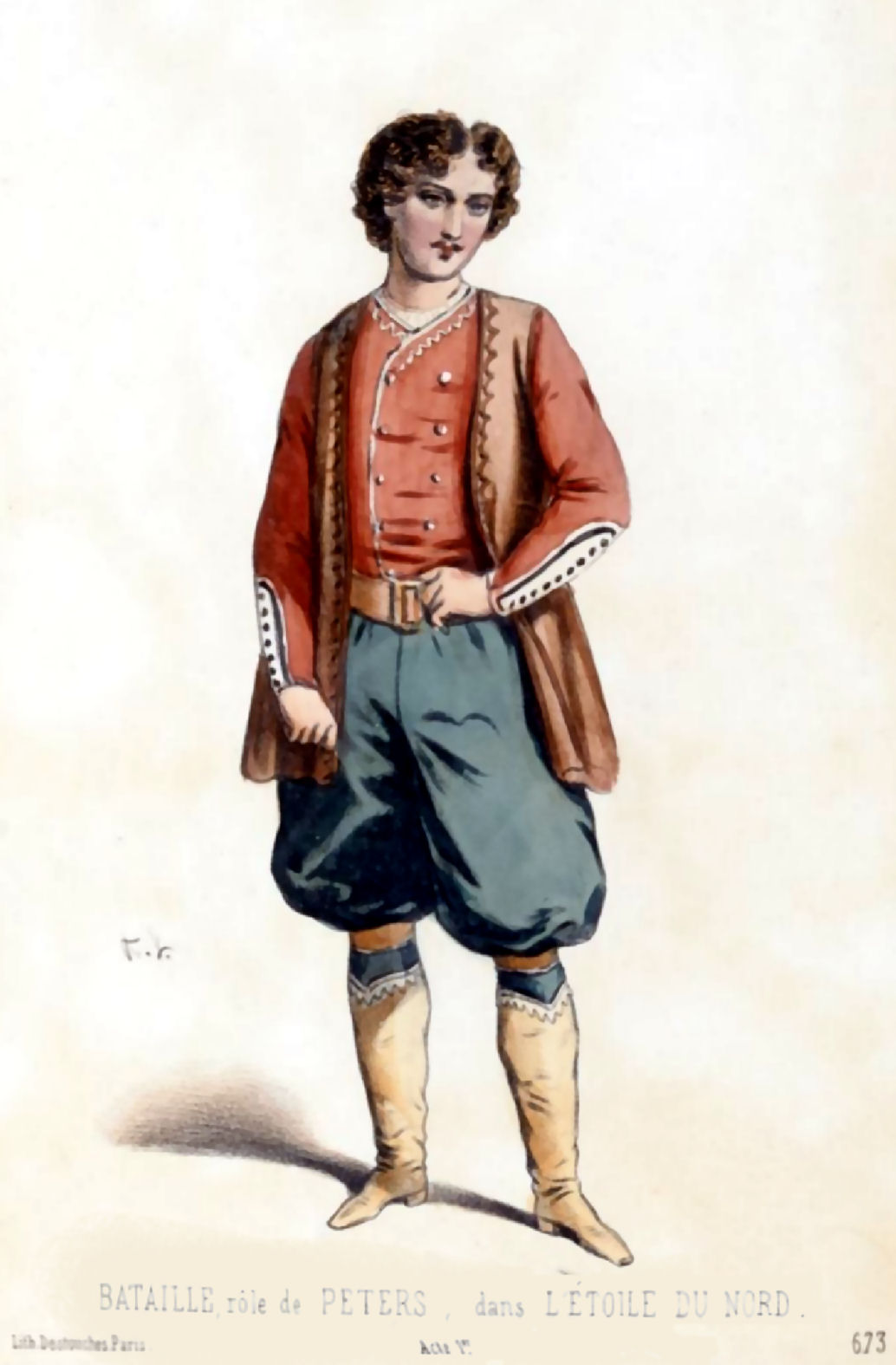
Costume of Battaille in the first act of Meyerbeer's L'Étoile du nord in 1854.

Noticed by Halévy, he successfully created the character of the old goatherd on 11 November 1848 in Le val d'Andorre. On May 18, 1849, he triumphed again in Adam's Le Toréador. He was appreciated both for his "beautiful round, full, well timbred, flattering and caressing voice sometimes, energetic and powerful in other cases" and for his acting.

Definitely launched, he premiered many roles including Atalmuc in Halévy's La Fée aux roses (1849), Falstaff in Adam's Songe d'une nuit d'été (1850), Roskaw in Halévy's La Dame de pique (1850), Mathéus in Albert Grisar's Le Carillonneur de Bruges (1852), in Reber's Le Père Gaillard (1852), Torrida in Auber's Marco Spada (1852), Péters in Meyerbeer's L'Étoile du nord (1854), le Commandeur in Thomas' La cour de Célimène (1855), Gédéon in Adam's Le Houzard de Berchini (1855), Nicolas in Massé's Les Saisons (1855), Gilbert in Halévy's Valentine d'Aubigny (1856) and Mercure in Thomas' Psyché (1857). He also sang in the premiere of Berlioz' L'Enfance du Christ (1854).

He left the stage in 1857 after a laryngeal disease, but quickly returned, first to the provinces, then to the Théâtre Lyrique where he participated in the première of Gounod's Philémon et Baucis (1860). He returned to the Opéra-Comique and ended his career in 1863.

Appointed professor at the Conservatoire de Paris in 1851, he was the author of a two-volume singing textbook : I. Nouvelles recherches sur la phonation (1861) and II. De la physiologie appliquée au mécanisme du chant (1863).

In 1870, he was appointed sub-prefect in Ancenis, where he distinguished himself during an epidemic of smallpox by going to treat the sick himself.

He died in 1872 in Paris at the age of 49.

== Main roles premiered by Battaille at the Opéra-Comique ==
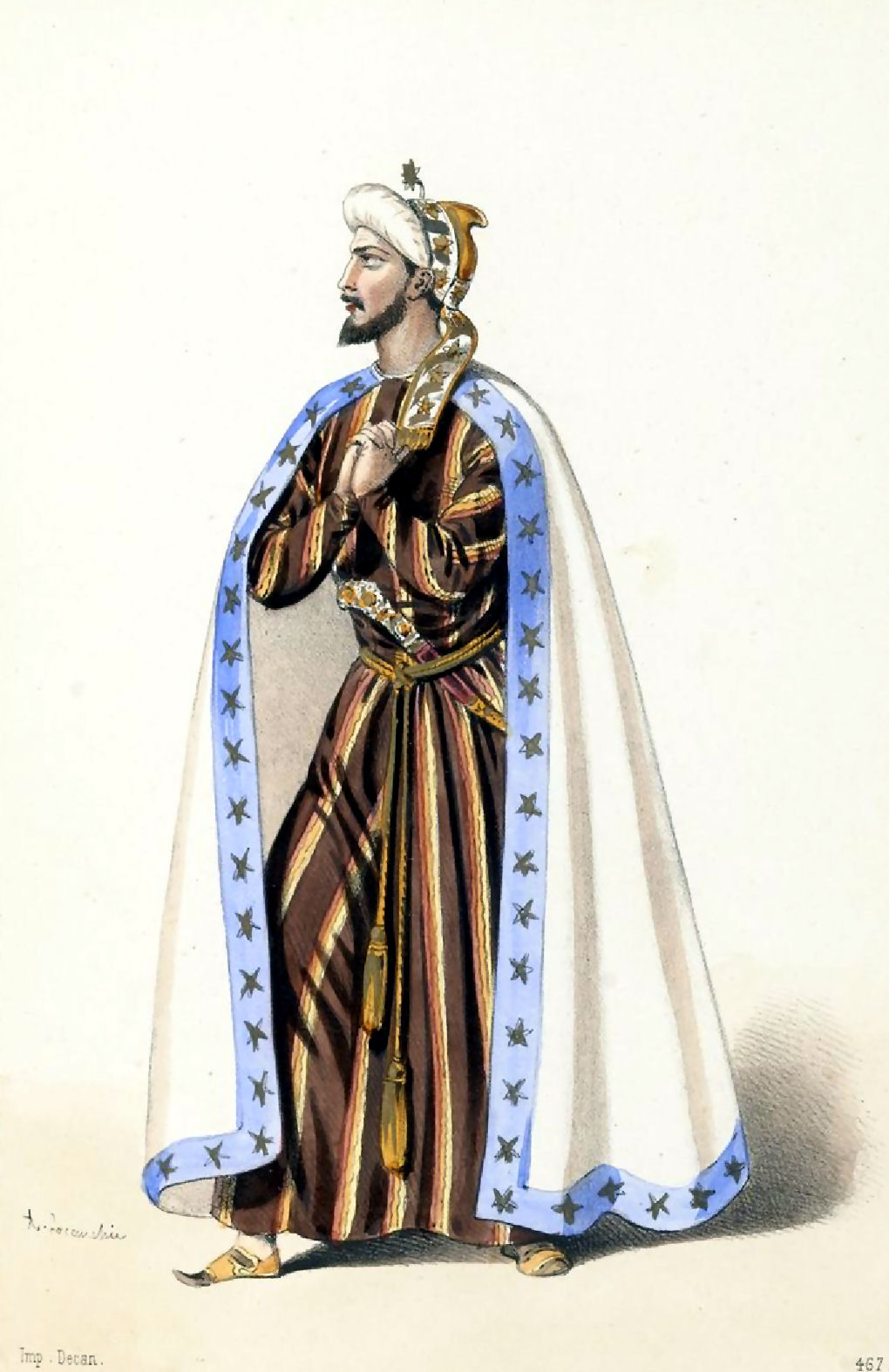
Atalmuc in Halévy's La Fée aux roses (1849)

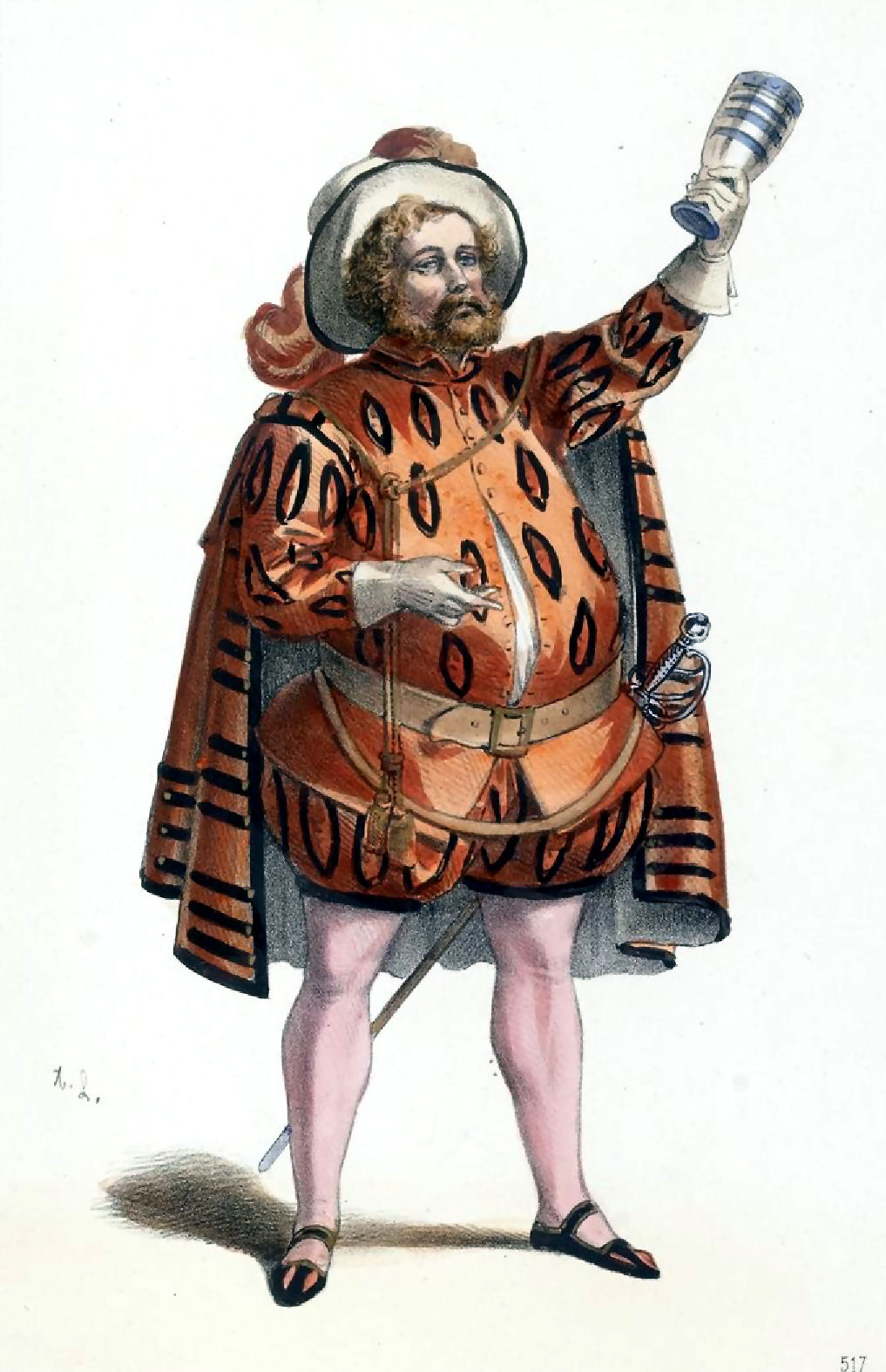
Falstaff in Thomas' Le Songe d'une nuit d'été (1850)

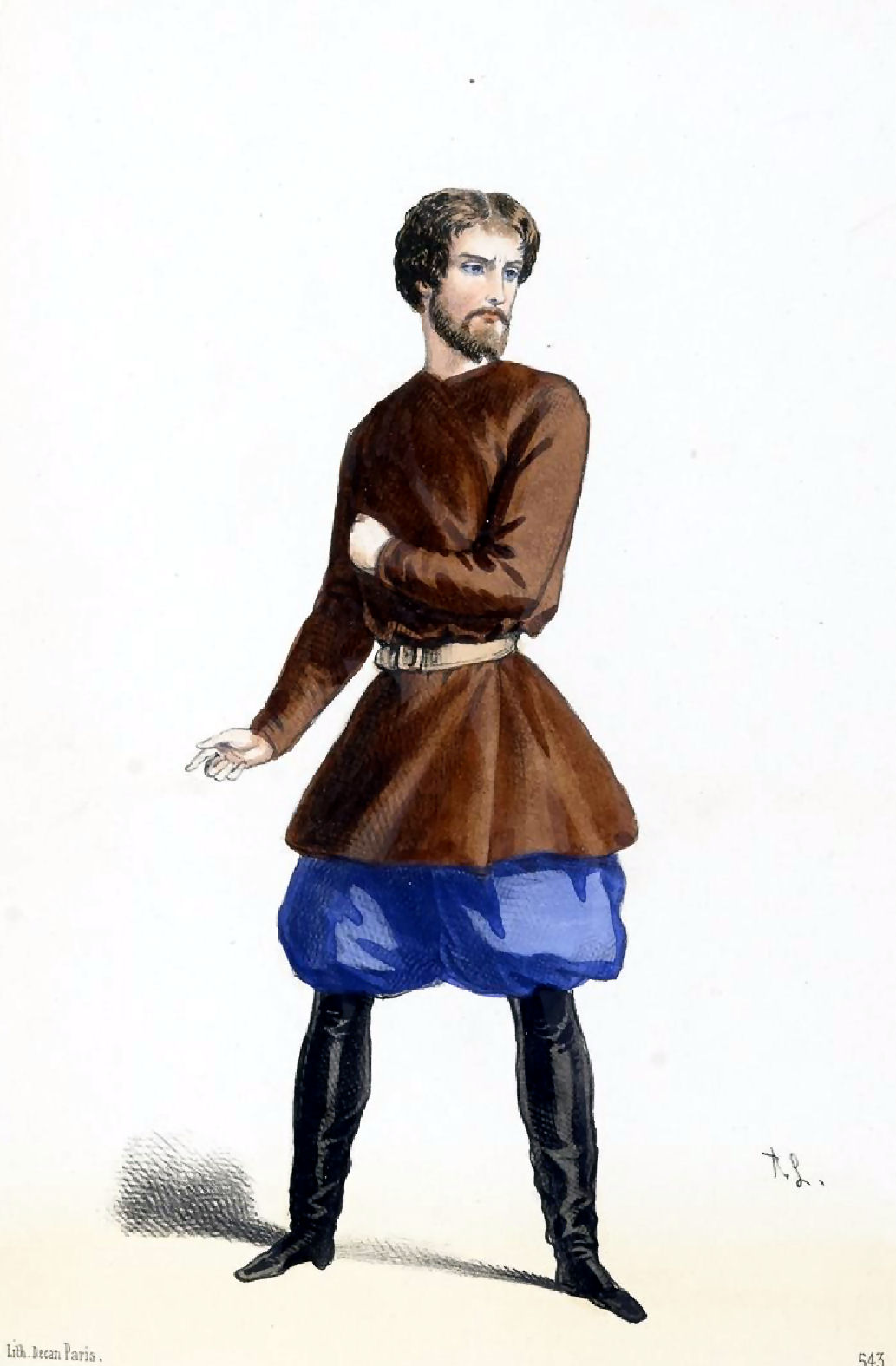
Roskaw in Halévy's La Dame de pique (1850)

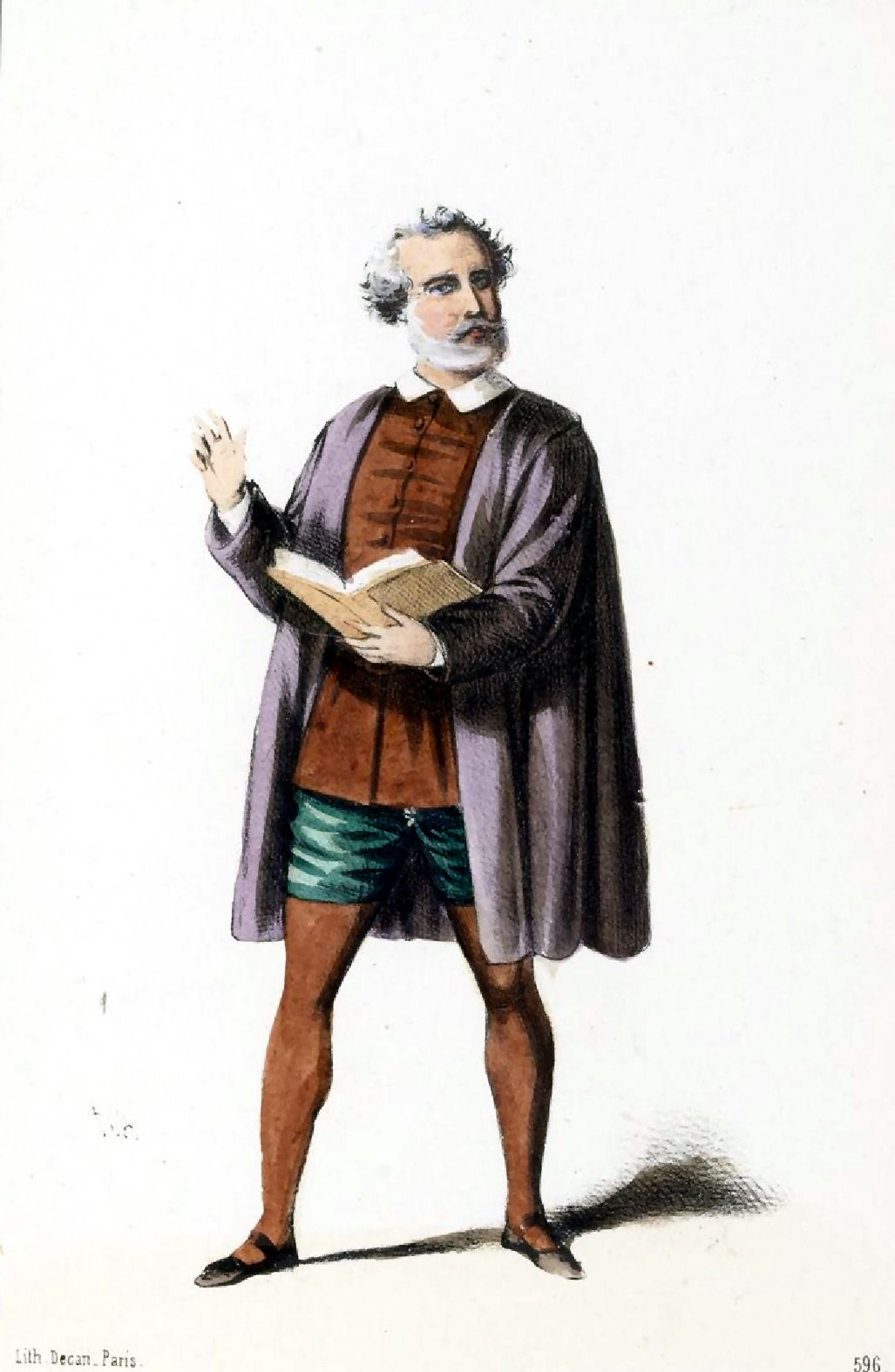
Mathéus in Grisar's Le Carillonneur de Bruges (1852)

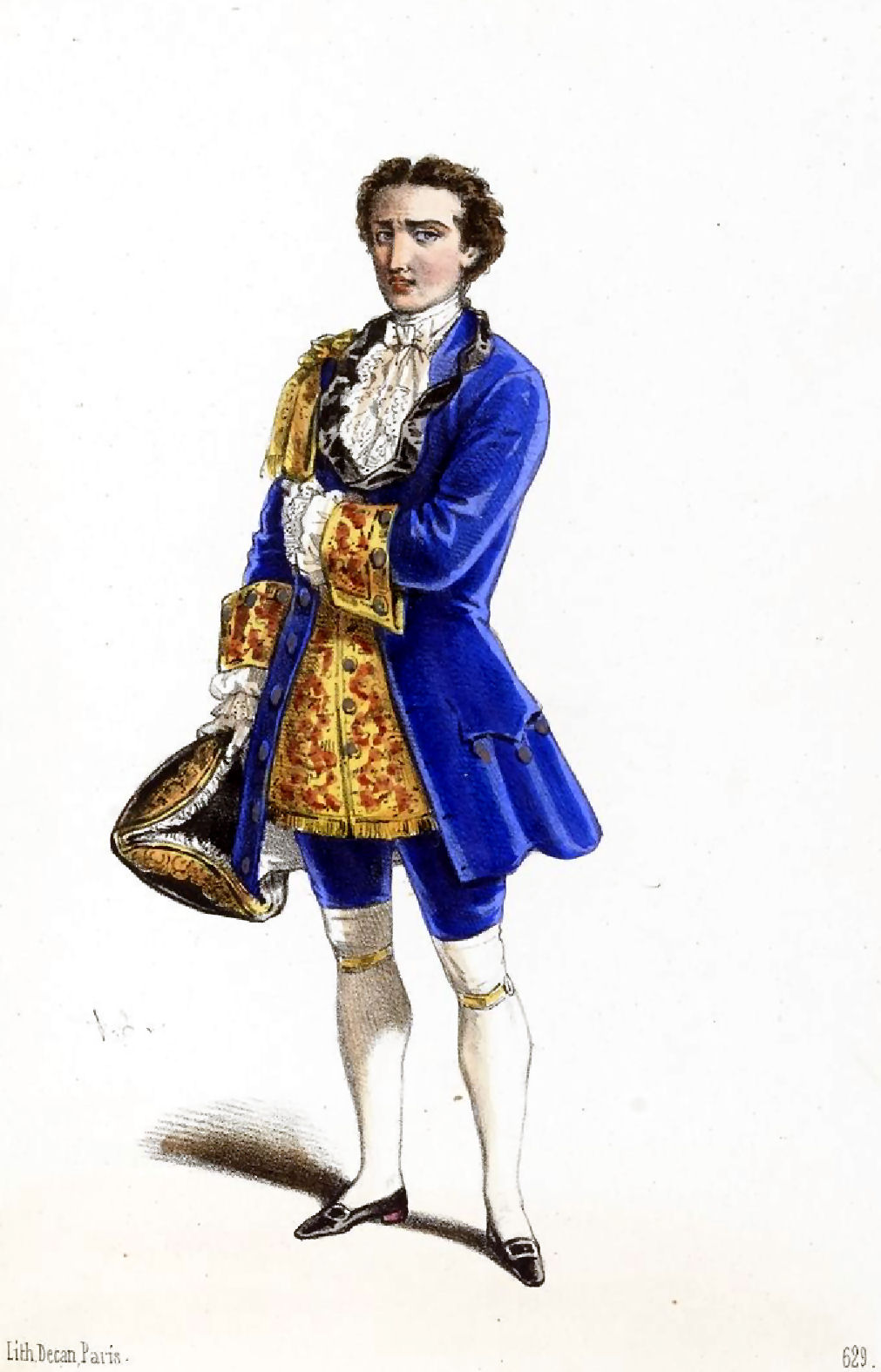
Le baron de Torrida in Auber's Marco Spada (1852)

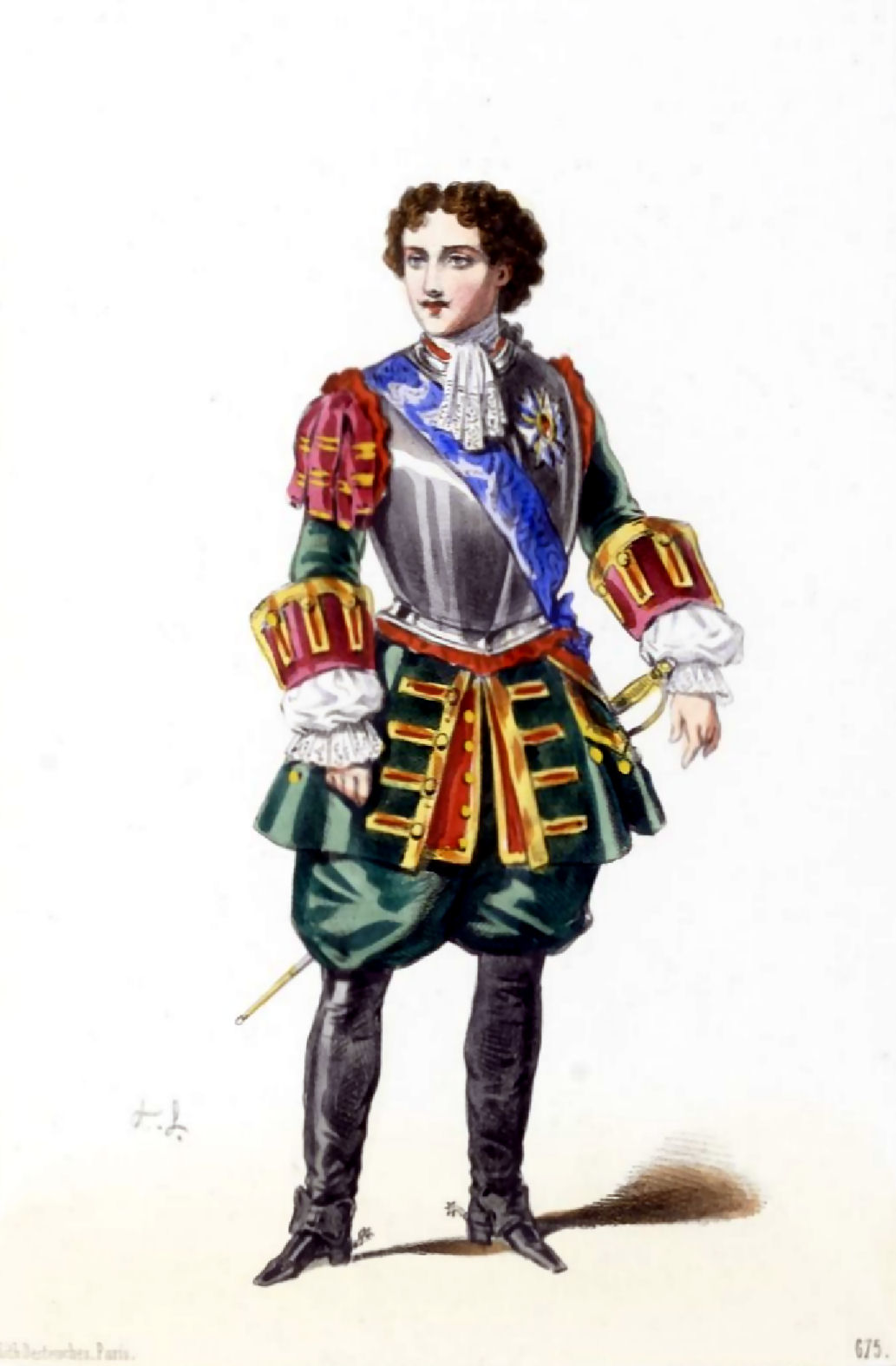
Péters in Meyerbeer's L'Étoile du nord (1854)

== Bibliography ==
- (in French) Theodore Baker and Nicolas Slonimsky, « Charles-Amable Battaille », Dictionnaire biographique des musiciens, translated from American by Marie-Stella Pâris, adapted and expanded by Alain Pâris, Robert Laffont, Paris, 1995, 4728 p. ISBN 2-221-07778-4
- (in French) François-Joseph Fétis and Arthur Pougin, « Charles-Amable Battaille », Biographie universelle des musiciens et bibliographie générale de la musique : Supplément et complément, vol. 1, Paris, Firmin-Didot, 1878, p. 53-54 Read online
- (in French) Andrew Gann, « Charles-Amable Battaille », Dictionnaire de la musique en France au XIXe siècle under the direction of Joël-Marie Fauquet, Fayard, Paris, 2003, 1406 p. ISBN 2-213-59316-7
