= Pretending =

Pretending or Pretend may refer to acting, the act of changing of one's behaviour to assume a role, either unconsciously to fill a social role, or consciously to act out an adopted role

Pretending or Pretend may also refer to:

== Music ==
- Pretend (band), American post-rock band
- Pretend (album), an album by Swedish singer and songwriter Seinabo Sey, 2015
- "Pretending" (Al Sherman song), a song with music and lyrics by Al Sherman and Marty Symes, 1946
- "Pretending" (Eric Clapton song), a song written and composed by Jerry Lynn Williams, 1989
- "Pretending" (Glee song), a song from the US TV series Glee
- "Pretending" (HIM song), a song by HIM, 2001
- "Pretend" (1952 song), a song, written by Lew Douglas, Cliff Parman, and Frank Levere
- "Pretend" (Tinashe song), a song by Tinashe featuring ASAP Rocky, 2014
- "Pretend", a song by Cheri Dennis from In and Out of Love, 2007
- “Pretend”, a song by Kevin Gates from I'm Him, 2019
- "Pretend", a song by Lights from The Listening, 2009
- "Pretending", a song by Sophie from Oil of Every Pearl's Un-Insides, 2018
- "Pretending", a song by Sweet Trip from You Will Never Know Why, 2009
- "Pretending", a song by Van Morrison from What's It Gonna Take?, 2022

== Film ==
- Pretending, known as Ugly Me in the U.S., 2006 Chilean romantic comedy film

== See also ==
- Pretender (disambiguation)
