= Mock orange =

Mock orange or mock-orange typically refers to Philadelphus, a mostly Holarctic genus of shrubs, particularly the species Philadelphus coronarius, which is widely cultivated as an ornamental plant.

Mock orange may also refer to:

== Plants ==
- Bursaria spinosa (Australian blackthorn), a small tree from Australia
- Choisya ternata (Mexican mock orange), a shrub native to Mexico
- Maclura pomifera (Osage-orange), a small tree from North America
- Murraya paniculata (orange jessamine), a small tree ranging from East Asia to Australasia
- Philadelphus lewisii (Lewis' mock-orange), a shrub from western North America and the state flower of Idaho.
- Pittosporum tobira, native to China, Japan, and Korea, and naturalized and cultivated elsewhere
- Pittosporum undulatum (sweet pittosporum), a small tree native to Australia
- Styrax americanus, (American snowbell), a small tree native to eastern North America

== Music ==
- Mock Orange (band), an indie rock band
- Mock Orange (album), 1997 album by Mock Orange
