= Large mock-olive =

Large mock-olive is a common name for several plants and may refer to:

- Notelaea longifolia
- Notelaea venosa
