= Toussaint-Eugène-Ernest Mocker =

French opera singer and stage director

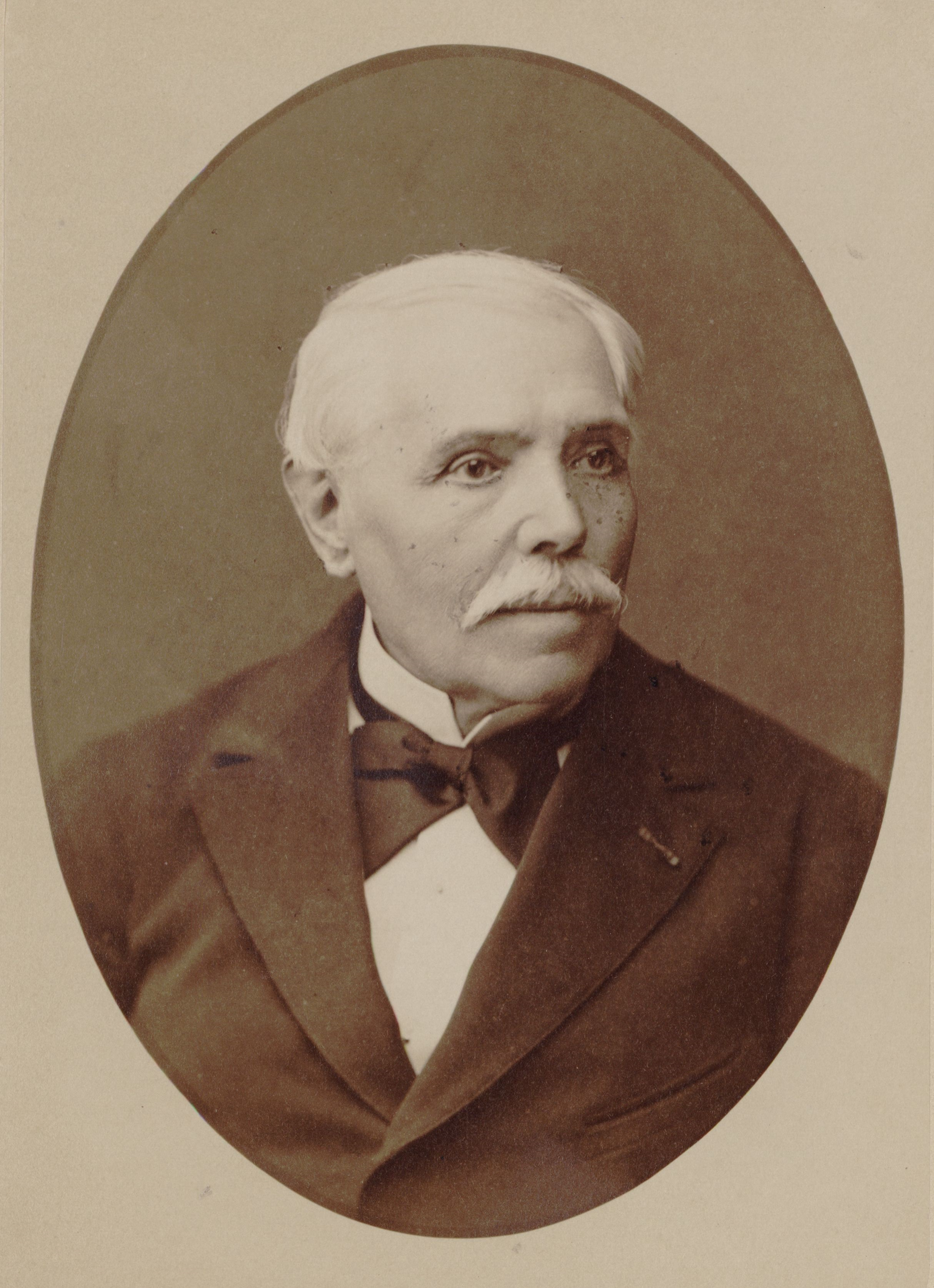
- Mocker, c. 1880; photo by Pierre Petit
- Born: 16 July 1811; Lyon, France
- Died: 3 October 1895 (aged 84); Brunoy, France
- Occupations: opera singer; stage director

Toussaint-Eugène-Ernest Mocker (16 July 1811 – 3 October 1895) was a French opera singer and stage director. In his 30-year career as a principal singer at the Théâtre Impérial de l'Opéra-Comique he created numerous roles in the company's world premieres and from 1860 served as a stage director there. In his later years he was a singing teacher at the Conservatoire de Paris.

== Roles created ==
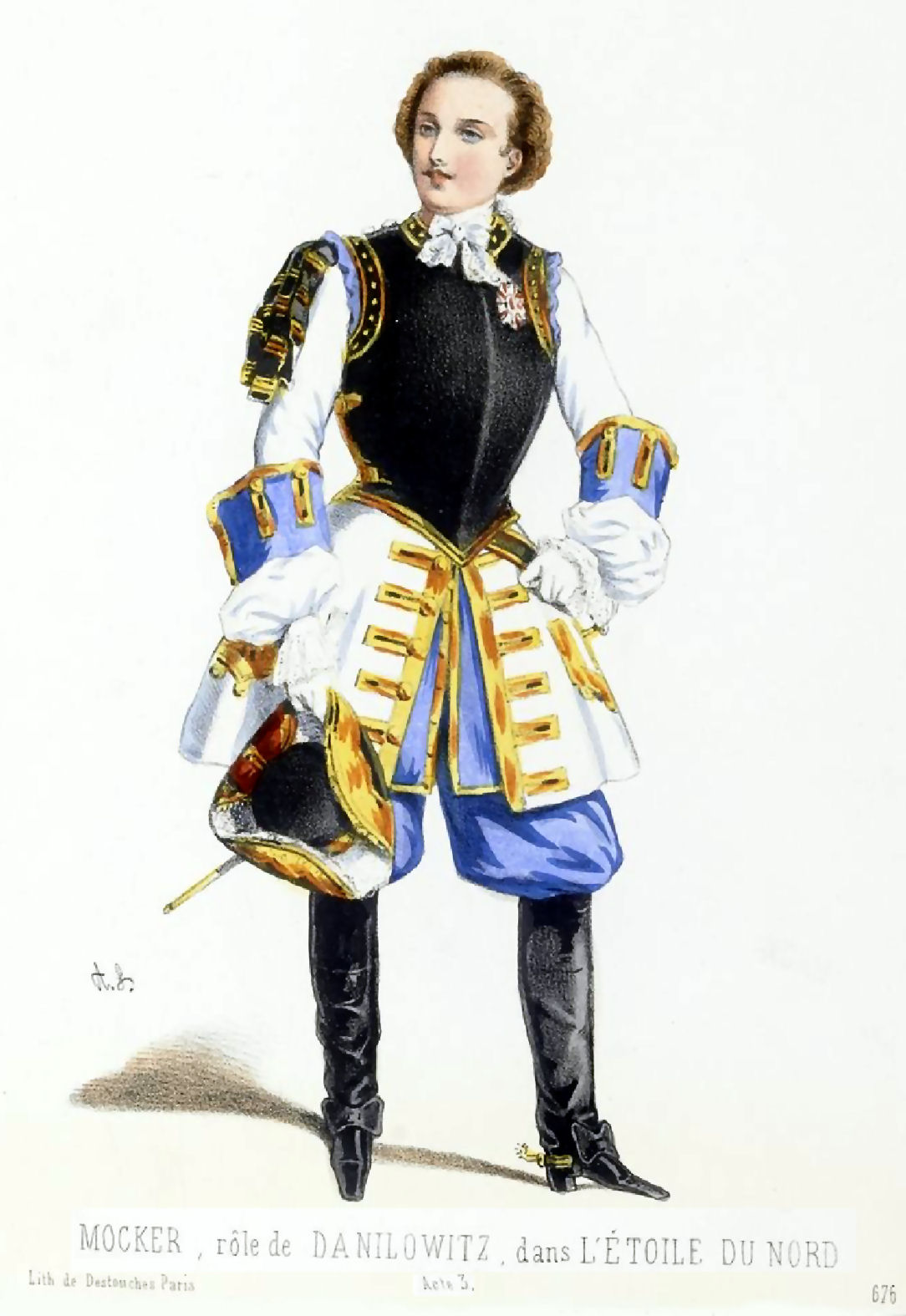
Mocker as Danilowitch in L'étoile du nord

Roles created by Mocker at the Opéra-Comique include:

- Lelio in Montfort's Polichinelle (1839)
- Albert in Clapisson's La symphonie, ou Maître Albert (1839)
- Comte d'Elvas in Adam's La reine d'un jour (1839)
- Charles VI in Auber's Zanetta (1840)
- Don Sébastien d'Aveyro in Auber's Les diamants de la couronne (1841)
- Tracolin in Adams's Le toréador (1849)
- Danilowitch in Meyerbeer's L'étoile du nord (1854)
- Chevalier de Boisrobert in Halévy's Valentine d'Aubigny (1856)
