= Mockery (1912 film) =

- Directed by: Laurence Trimble
- Production company: Vitagraph Studios
- Release date: 5 June 1912 (USA)

Mockery is an American short silent film directed by Laurence Trimble for Vitagraph. The movie was released on June 5, 1912, being Marshall P. Wilder's first appearance in a dramatic role.

== Cast ==
- Marshall P. Wilder Pepito, a Clown
- Clara Kimball Young Princess Dolorosa
- Ralph Ince Prince Dionio
- James Young Lorenzo, the Court Physician
