= List of Kimba the White Lion episodes =

These are the episodes of the anime television series Kimba the White Lion (Jungle Emperor). The series originally ran from October 6, 1965, to September 28, 1966, in Japan and from September 11, 1966, to September 3, 1967, in the United States.

There were two English dubs produced for this anime series. The first (and more widely viewed) English dub was produced by Titan Productions for NBC Enterprises to license and run in syndication in the United States, with a handful of talented voice actors. Despite the fact that they dubbed all 52 episodes of the series, 49 of them have been aired in a mixed-up order in the United States, due to the NBC catalog order of how they aired them in sequence. On September 30, 1978, the license for NBC to hold the rights to the English dub has dropped due to the bankruptcy of Mushi Productions earlier in 1973. Afterwards, the Titan Productions English dub was no longer available to view at that time.

In 1993, Fumio Suzuki made plans to bring the series to television once more to the English-speaking market. After the legal battles of who was going to gain ownership, a Canadian company from Toronto known as Zaza Sound Productions Ltd. won the rights to produce a second English dub of the anime series with a handful of Canadian voice actors, as well as airing this dub in several English-speaking regions (Australia, United Kingdom, etc.), with CEG Distribution distributing the series. Landmark Entertainment Group Inc., Susuki Associates and CEG Cinema Partners have also contributed to this dub. Fans have often labeled this as the "Canadian dub". It was said to be a remake of the 1966 US English dub, with a more faithful translation of the original Japanese scripts, but had to create a whole new soundtrack composed by Paul J. Zaza, since they were unable to use the original soundtrack composed by Isao Tomita which was also used in the 1966 US English dub. This version was also more edited including heavy cuts and changes.

In 1995, A low-budget American company known as UAV Corporation released a limited number of episodes of the 1993 Canadian English re-dub on VHS in North America, under the title Kimba the Lion Prince.

== Episode list ==
| J no. | US no. | English dub title/Original title (English)/ Original title (Japanese) | Original Japanese airdate | English dub airdate (US dub) | English dub airdate (Canada dub) |
|---|---|---|---|---|---|
| 1 | 1 | "Go, White Lion!" / "Go, Child of Panja"; Transliteration: "Ike Panja no ko" (Japanese: 行けパンジャの子) | October 6, 1965 | September 11, 1966 | 1993 |
The king of the jungle, Caesar (Panja), is fooled into and killed in a trap by the humans, and his mate, the queen, is captured and put on a ship. Two months later, Kimba (Leo) is born and with the help of the animals on board, the ship is sunk and Kimba escapes to swim back to Africa. 1993 Canadian dub English title: "The Legend of the Claw" Note: This episode title is also translated as: "The Birth of Kimba"
| 2 | 8 | "The Wind in the Desert" / "The Wind in the Desert"; Transliteration: "Sabaku no kaze" (Japanese: 砂漠の風) | October 13, 1965 | October 30, 1966 | 1993 |
Kimba (Leo) returns to his native jungle, but is soon captured by human gangsters, apparently doomed to share his parents' fate. However, one of them, James Brawn, reveals himself as a lawman and frees Kimba. On their way back to the jungle, they go through many dangers together until James perishes from exposure in the desert, but not before convincing Kimba that not all humans are animalkind's enemies.
| 3 | 14 | "A Human Friend" / "Animal School"; Transliteration: "Doubutsu Gakkou" (Japanese: 動物学校) | October 20, 1965 | December 11, 1966 | 1993 |
Kimba (Leo) meets Roger Ranger (Kenichi) and learns human language. Note 1: In the original Japanese version, Roger (Kenichi) was searching for Kimba (Leo), indicating that they had already met. Note 2: In the 1993 Canadian English dub, Kenichi was known as Jonathan. This has caused a strong confusion towards some viewers because oddly enough, James Brawn from the previous episode also had his name changed to Jonathan, which made viewers believe that the two characters were the same person. It was most likely intentional on how Zaza Sound Productions Ltd. intended the series to be aimed for a younger audience and did not want death mentioned towards that audience.
| 4 | 4 | "Great Caesar's Ghost" / "Samson, the Wild Ox"; Transliteration: "Mou Ushi Samuson" (Japanese: 猛牛サムソン) | October 27, 1965 | October 2, 1966 | 1993 |
Kimba's belief that all animals should live in harmony is tested when Samson, an old friend of Kimba's father turns up to visit. When Samson ridicules Kimba, it is his old friends Dan'l Baboon and Pauley Cracker to the rescue. Knowing Kimba's desire to speak with his deceased father, Dan'l and Pauley scheme together and dress as Caesar's ghost who has come to guide Kimba back to his friends with some beyond-the-grave advice. When hunters invade the jungle, it is Kimba who unites the animals to work together to keep their home safe. When they work together to bring peace to the jungle, Samson is forced to admit that maybe Kimba's ways are the right ways after all. 1993 Canadian dub English title(s): "River Battle", "The Law of the Jungle"
| 5 | 46 | "Fair Game" / "Memory of the Continent"; Transliteration: "Mabuta no Tairiku" (Japanese: まぶたの大陸) | November 3, 1965 | July 23, 1967 | 1993 |
1993 Canadian dub English title: "A Friend Indeed"
| 6 | 2 | "Jungle Thief" / "The Starving Savannah"; Transliteration: "Ueta Sabanna" (Japanese: 飢えたサバンナ) | November 10, 1965 | September 18, 1966 | 1993 |
| 7 | 10 | "Battle at Dead River" / "The Fight at Donga"; Transliteration: "Donga no Ketsu to" (Japanese: ドンガの決斗) | November 17, 1965 | November 13, 1966 | 1993 |
1993 Canadian dub English title(s): "Rumble in the Jungle", "Troublemaker"
| 8 | 9 | "The Insect Invasion" / "The Mad Cloud"; Transliteration: "Ki chigai Kumo" (Japanese: きちがい雲) | November 24, 1965 | November 6, 1966 | 1993 |
| 9 | 23 | "The Monstrous Animal / The Winged King" / "The Mad Cloud"; Transliteration: "Tsubasa aru ouja" (Japanese: 翼ある王者) | December 1, 1965 | February 7, 1967 | 1993 |
An old eagle begins terrorizing the jungle, but as Kimba moves against it, another airborne predator of a very unusual nature makes its appearance: a tiger with wings. As the emboldened tiger attempts to claim rulership over the jungle, Kimba must team up with the ambitious scientist who created the monstrosity to undo this unnatural menace.
| 10 | 39 | "Two Hearts" / "Two Hearts And Two Minds"; Transliteration: "Futatsu no kokoro" (Japanese: ふたつの心) | December 8, 1965 | June 4, 1967 | 1993 |
| 11 | 52 | "Catch Em' If You Can" / "Konga's Hunting Ground, Pt. 1"; Transliteration: "Kong shuryou ku mae hen" (Japanese: コンガ狩猟区 前篇) | December 15, 1965 | September 3, 1967 | 1993 |
| 12 | 19 | "The Hunting Ground" / "Konga's Hunting Ground, Pt. 2"; Transliteration: "Kong shuryou ku go hen" (Japanese: コンガ狩猟区 後篇) | December 22, 1965 | January 15, 1967 | 1993 |
| 13 | 18 | "The Trappers" / "Jungle Chorus"; Transliteration: "Mitsurin no dai gasshou" (Japanese: 密林の大合唱) | December 29, 1965 | January 8, 1967 | 1993 |
With Roger (Kenichi) longing for human company, Kimba (Leo) and the other animals form a chorus to revive his spirits. But their singing summons Viper Snakely (Hamm Egg) and Tubby (Kutter), who are on yet another hunting expedition, to their location, and upon recognizing his father's slayers, Kimba must decide whether or not he wishes to seek revenge for his parents' deaths.
| 14 | 5 | "Journey Into Time" / "The Story of Androcles"; Transliteration: "Andorokuresu Monogatari" (Japanese: アンドロクレス物語) | January 5, 1966 | October 5, 1966 | 1993 |
1993 Canadian dub English title(s): "The Legend of the White Lion"
| 15 | 11 | "Scrambled Eggs" / "Eggs, Eggs, Eggs"; Transliteration: "Tamago, Tamago, Tamago" (Japanese: 卵・卵・卵) | January 12, 1966 | November 20, 1966 | 1993 |
Speedy Cheetah (Bongo) gets all the birds' eggs mixed up and Kimba (Leo) has to find their correct mothers. 1993 Canadian dub English title(s): "Egg Hunt"
| 16 | 34 | "Diamonds in the Gruff" / "The Burning River"; Transliteration: "Moeru Kawa" (Japanese: 燃える河) | January 19, 1966 | April 30, 1967 | 1993 |
| 17 | 21 | "The Magic Serpent" / "Nura, the Mad Serpent" / "The Strange Blue Snake"; Transliteration: "Bukimi na ao hebi" (Japanese: 無気味な青蛇) | January 26, 1966 | January 29, 1967 | TBA |
| 18 | 35 | "The Runaway" / "Bella and His Award"; Transliteration: "Bera to Kunshou" (Japanese: ベラと勲章) | February 2, 1966 | January 29, 1967 | TBA |
| 19 | 28 | "The Sealed Hut" / "The Mystery of the Deserted Village"; Transliteration: "Hiraka zu no koya" (Japanese: 開かずの小屋) | February 9, 1966 | March 19, 1967 | TBA |
An entourage of travelling humans come to Kimba's (Leo's) jungle. When two of their members decide to investigate an abandoned native village, and Kimba has to rescue them, he is surprised to discover there a part of his family story he was never aware of - including an older sister.
| 20 | 6 | "Restaurant Trouble" / "Restaurant Rebellion"; Transliteration: "Resutoran Soudou" (Japanese: レストラン騒動) | February 16, 1966 | October 16, 1966 | TBA |
| 21 | 7 | "The Bad Baboon" / "Sandy's Revenge"; Transliteration: "Kaette kita Sandi" (Japanese: 帰って来たサンディ) | February 23, 1966 | October 23, 1966 | TBA |
A mandrill named Big-O (Sandy) once lost a duel against Dan'l (Burazza) and was driven from the jungle. Now he returns to seek revenge, but in his single-mindedness his scheme to blackmail Dan'l into fighting him spells the possible extinction of all life in the jungle. While Kimba (Leo) tries to attain a peaceful outcome (to the point where he has Dan'l locked up for his own safety), Dan'l himself frantically works on a scheme of his own in order to stop his enemy's plans.
| 22 | 3 | "Dangerous Journey" / "Pop Barcy"; Transliteration: "Baashi Tottsan" (Japanese: バーシィとっつぁん) | March 2, 1966 | September 25, 1966 | TBA |
The deadly speckled fever spreads among the jungle animals, and Kimba (Leo) seeks the aid of an old mountain goat, Pop Barcy, to retrieve the only known cure. However, in order to obtain the medicine, the two must journey into a mountainous region inhabited by vicious flying lizards.
| 23 | 27 | "The Gigantic Grasshopper" / "The Gigantic Grasshopper"; Transliteration: "Dai Kai Chuu" (Japanese: 大怪虫) | March 9, 1966 | March 12, 1967 | TBA |
Deleted scene: After Kimba drives the giant grasshopper into the volcano, he slowly returns with a heavy heart to the other animals. The scene was still present in the US English dub, but only for four seconds, with cheers from the animals. The original Japanese version had this scene lasting for 20 seconds of silence, until Kimba announced the death of the grasshopper.
| 24 | 13 | "Gypsy's Purple Potion" / "Mammy of the Forest"; Transliteration: "Mori no Mamī" (Japanese: 森のマミー) | March 16, 1966 | December 4, 1966 | TBA |
| 25 | 30 | "Too Many Elephants" / "Jumbo, the Baby Elephant"; Transliteration: "Kozō Janbo" (Japanese: 子象ジャンボ) | March 23, 1966 | April 2, 1967 | TBA |
| 26 | 36 | "A Revolting Development" / "The Meat of Peace"; Transliteration: "Heiwa no Niku" (Japanese: 平和の肉) | March 30, 1966 | May 14, 1967 | TBA |
| 27 | 12 | "The Chameleon Who Cried Wolf" / "The Sad Chameleon"; Transliteration: "Kanashii Kameron" (Japanese: 悲しいカメレオン) | April 6, 1966 | November 27, 1966 | TBA |
| 28 | 15 | "The Wild Wildcat" / "Myu, The Wildcat"; Transliteration: "Yamaneko Myū" (Japanese: 山猫ミュー) | April 13, 1966 | December 18, 1966 | TBA |
| 29 | 31 | "The Nightmare Narcissus" / "Araune, the Carnivorous Plant"; Transliteration: "Shoku juu hana Araune" (Japanese: 食獣花アラウネ) | April 20, 1966 | April 9, 1967 | TBA |
Something strange happens when Dr. Spree's flower experiment turns devious, for those who smell the obscure flower end up having violent, brutal nightmares, which results in the animals turning against each other. This unfortunately also causes them to be unsure as to what is a nightmare and what is reality. It is up to Kimba to investigate the problem.
| 30 | 32 | "Adventure in the City" / "Pursuit"; Transliteration: "Tsuiseki Ryokou" (Japanese: 追跡旅行) | April 27, 1966 | April 16, 1967 | TBA |
| 31 | 16 | "City of Gold" / The Mystery of Dead Man's Cave; Transliteration: "Shinin hora no Nazo" (Japanese: 死びと洞の謎) | May 4, 1966 | December 25, 1966 | TBA |
| 32 | 17 | "The Last Poacher" / "The Last Poacher"; Transliteration: "Sai Kisaki no Mitsuryou Sha" (Japanese: 最後の密猟者) | May 11, 1966 | January 1, 1967 | TBA |
| 33 | 29 | "Jungle Justice" / "Huuk, the Hippo without Tusks"; Transliteration: "Kiba Nashi Hyūku Jiken" (Japanese: 牙なしヒューク事件) | May 18, 1966 | March 26, 1967 | TBA |
| 34 | 43 | "Jungle Fun" / "The Dancing Jungle, Pt. 1" / "Totto the Panther's Revenge, Pt. 1"; Transliteration: "Kurohyō Totto no Gyakushū mae hen" (Japanese: 黒豹トットの逆襲 前篇) | May 25, 1966 | July 2, 1967 | TBA |
Note: The editors of the US English dub did not want this to be a two-part scenario with this episode's successor, so therefore, they cut out the last shots of the roller-coaster scene for the English dub, where Claw got the hyenas to sabotage the ride and Kimba got seriously hurt. Some of the shots can be seen at the beginning of the next episode, "The Pretenders".
| 35 | 44 | "The Pretenders" / "The Dancing Jungle, Pt. 2" / "Totto the Panther's Revenge, Pt. 2"; Transliteration: "Kurohyō Totto no Gyakushū go hen" (Japanese: 黒豹トットの逆襲 後篇) | June 1, 1966 | July 9, 1967 | TBA |
| 36 | 45 | "The Monster Of Petrified Valley" / "The Monster of Musk Valley"; Transliteration: "Masuku tani no Kaibutsu" (Japanese: マスク谷の怪物) | June 8, 1966 | July 16, 1967 | TBA |
Three of Kimba's friends get lost in a haunted valley, which is rumored to house a legendary monster. The creature, however, is merely a rare giant bird, the last of its kind, seeking shelter here, and out of compassion Kimba invites him to live in the jungle. But this kind invitation brings a lot of trouble.
| 37 | 20 | "Legend of Hippo Valley" / "The Howling Statue of Evil"; Transliteration: "Hoeru ma zou" (Japanese: ほえる魔像) | June 15, 1966 | January 22, 1967 | TBA |
Their crops hit by a drought, Kimba and the other jungle animals try to obtain water from a legendary valley, a sacred site for a band of hippos. However, the history of the valley is stained by a dark legend, and Kimba must work very hard to gain the trust and cooperation of the hippo chief in order to overcome this deadly legacy.
| 38 | 22 | "Volcano Valley" / "Volcanic Island"; Transliteration: "Kazan Mizuumi Tou" (Japanese: 火山湖島) | June 22, 1966 | February 5, 1967 | TBA |
| 39 | 24 | "Running Wild" / "The Season of Madness"; Transliteration: "Kyōki no Kisetsu" (Japanese: 狂気の季節) | June 29, 1966 | February 19, 1967 | TBA |
| 40 | 26 | "The Troublemaker" / "MahBo, the Troublemaker" / "The Rowdy Ones from the Plains"; Transliteration: "Sōgen no Abarenbō" (Japanese: 草原の暴れん坊) | July 6, 1966 | March 5, 1967 | TBA |
| 41 | 25 | "Destroyers from the Desert" / "Wandering Death Gods"; Transliteration: "Sasurai no Shinigami" (Japanese: = さすらいの死神) | July 13, 1966 | February 26, 1967 | TBA |
A legendary trio of vicious animals appears from the desert, terrorizing the jungle inhabitants and depleting their food supplies while revelling in their supposed indestructibility. When Dan'l despairs in the face of this menace, Coco decides to take matters into his own hands and tenaciously prepare Kimba for his decisive confrontation with the three miscreants.
| 42 | 47 | "The Balloon That Blows Up" / "Balloon Adventure" / "The Mischievous Act"; Transliteration: "Wanpaku Sakusen" (Japanese: わんぱく作戦) | July 20, 1966 | July 30, 1967 | TBA |
Out of curiosity, Kimba and three of his friends climb into a balloon and are set adrift. When they finally come aground again, they meet an old blind man who wants his only son, who is serving as a soldier, to return home, and feel compelled to aid him.
| 43 | 48 | "Monster of the Mountain" / "The Enraged Chimiset Bear"; Transliteration: "Ikari no Chimisetto" (Japanese: 怒りのチミセット) | July 27, 1966 | August 6, 1967 | TBA |
Investigating the rumors of a vicious predator in a far-away region, Kimba and Cheetah (Bongo) encounter a Chimiset mother bear and her little cub, who are living off local livestock. Kimba struggles to find a way to negotiate with the mother to leave the villages alone, lest her continued raids will eventually spell doom for both her and the local humans.
| 44 | 38 | "A Friend In Deed" / "Rainbow Valley"; Transliteration: "Niji no Tani" (Japanese: 虹の谷) | August 3, 1966 | May 28, 1967 | TBA |
| 45 | 33 | "Such Sweet Sorrow" / "The Phantom Mountain"; Transliteration: "Ma boroshi no yama" (Japanese: まぼろしの山) | August 10, 1966 | April 23, 1967 | TBA |
| 46 | 51 | "The Return of Fancy Prancy" / "Jane Returns from the City"; Transliteration: "Machi kara kita Jēn" (Japanese: 町から来たジェーン) | August 17, 1966 | August 28, 1967 | TBA |
Speedy's sister Prancy returns to the jungle after living in a nearby city. She works her charms on the male animals, leading to a war. However, a more urgent crisis arises when ants invade the territory, and all the animals have to flee for their lives.
| 47 | 50 | "The Cobweb Caper" / The Monstrous Spider; Transliteration: "Ma dara Gumo" (Japanese: まだらグモ) | August 24, 1966 | August 20, 1967 | TBA |
| 48 | 42 | "The Red Menace" / "The Red Monster"; Transliteration: "Akai Kiba" (Japanese: 赤い牙) | August 31, 1966 | June 25, 1967 | TBA |
| 49 | 49 | "The Sun Tree" / "The Tree of the Morning Sun"; Transliteration: "Asahi o Maneku Ki" (Japanese: 朝日をまねく木) | September 7, 1966 | August 13, 1967 | TBA |
| 50 | 40 | "Soldier of Fortune" / "Otto the Adventurer"; Transliteration: "Bōken-ka Ottō" (Japanese: 冒険家オットー) | September 14, 1966 | June 11, 1967 | TBA |
An adventurous seal named Otto attempts to pass through Kimba's jungle in order to reach the Indian Ocean in the east. Curious and excited, Kimba and a few volunteers accompany Otto on his journey, only to encounter several odd obstacles.
| 51 | 41 | "The Day the Sun Went Out" / "Ryonna's House" / "The Shrine on the Nile"; Transliteration: "Nairu no Dai Shinden" (Japanese: ナイルの大神殿) | September 21, 1966 | June 18, 1967 | TBA |
| 52 | 37 | "Silvertail the Renegade" / "Makoba, the Old Lion" / "The Man-Eating Lion"; Transliteration: "Jin Gui Raion" (Japanese: 人喰いライオン) | September 28, 1966 | May 21, 1967 | TBA |
An old-aged lion named Silvertail (Makoba) has ventured into the jungle, who has been persuaded by a hunting party for over a week, due to a rumor saying that he was stealing livestock from a village. He is an insurgent-based lion attacking animals that are all weaker than him. He does need help with hiding from his enemies, but he also must promise Kimba (Leo) not to attack weaker animals and must learn to not be so fierce with other civilians in the jungle. He must also ask to be forgiven, if he is going stay in the jungle for the rest of his life with Kimba and his friends.

== See also ==
- Osamu Tezuka
