= Le duc de Guise =

Le duc de Guise (full title Le duc de Guise, ou Les ėtats de Blois (The Duke of Guise, or The Council of Blois)) is an opéra comique in three acts by George Onslow, to a libretto by François-Antoine-Eugène de Planard and Jules-Henri Vernoy de Saint-Georges, based on a play from 1809 of the same name by François Just Marie Raynouard. The opera received its premiere on 8 September 1837 at the Opéra-Comique in Paris.

The opera, which centres on the assassination of the Duc de Guise in 1588, was the third and last of Onslow's operas to be produced. The text and music were well received by the audience, but Gérard de Nerval complained in a review that they had not offered Jenny Colon the opportunity to display her talents.

Onslow made an arrangement of extracts of the opera for string quartet (his Op. 60).

== Roles ==
Role	Voice type	Premiere cast, 8 September 1837
Henri III	tenor	Théodore-François Moreau-Santi
Henri, duc de Guise	tenor	Jean-Baptiste Chollet
Larchant, an officer of the King	bass	François-Louis Henry
Loignac, a Gascon	tenor	Paul-Jean Fargueil
Péricart, porter of the castle of Blois	tenor	Joseph-Antoine-Charles Couderc
Saint-Pol, one of Guise's officers		Victor
Cathérine de Médicis		Mme. Boulanger
La marquise de Sauve. mistress of the duc de Guise		Mme. Prévost
Paulette, a milkmaid	soprano	Jenny Colon
Courtiers, bourgeois, soldiers, members of the council.
