= La fille du régiment =

1840 opéra comique by Gaetano Donizetti

- Opéra comique by Gaetano Donizetti
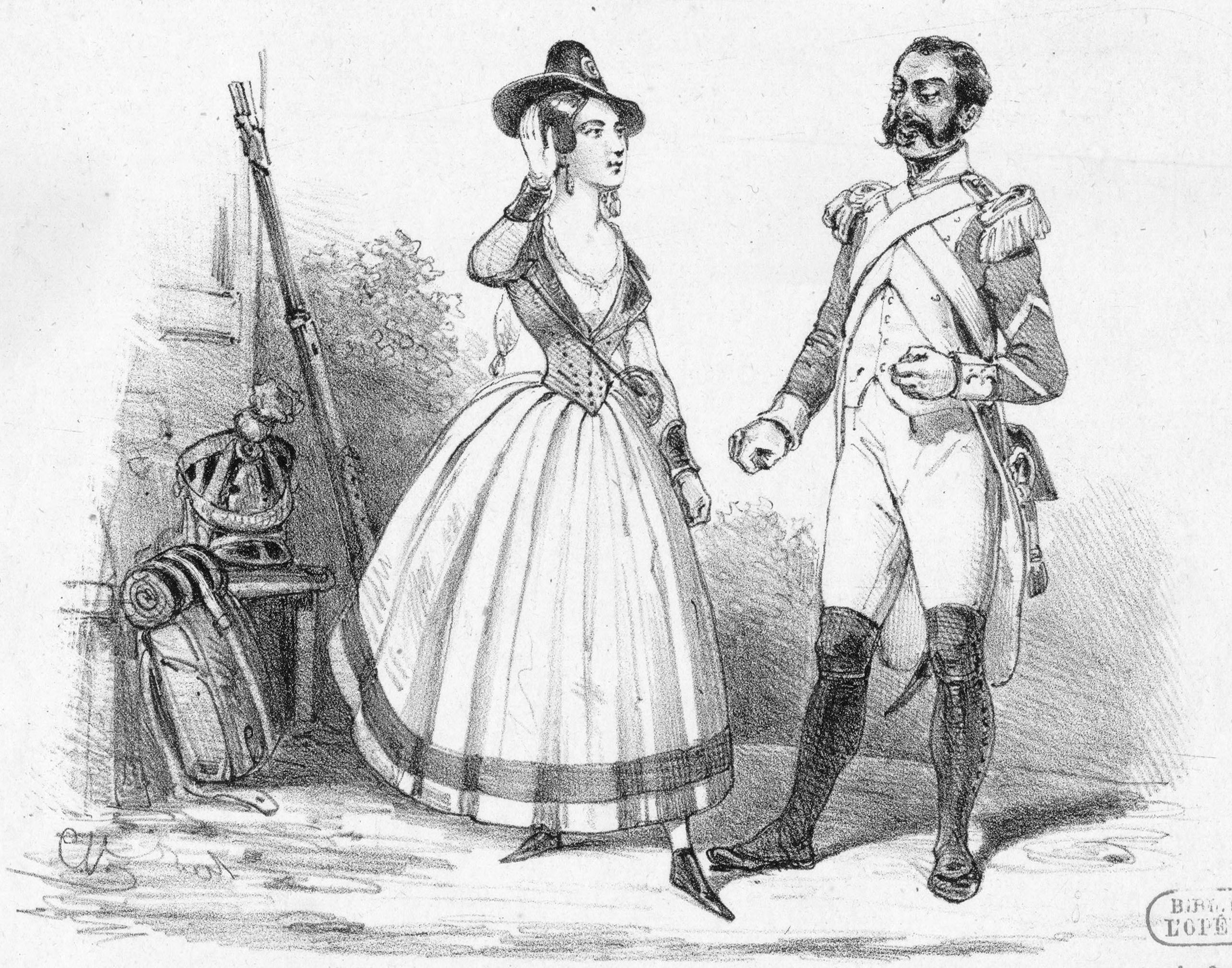
- Euphrasie Borghèse as Marie and François-Louis Henry as Sulpice in the premiere
- Translation: The Daughter of the Regiment
- Librettist: Jules-Henri Vernoy de Saint-Georges; Jean-François Bayard
- Language: French
- Premiere: 11 February 1840; Salle de la Bourse, Paris

La fille du régiment (French pronunciation: [la fij dy ʁeʒimɑ̃], The Daughter of the Regiment) is an opéra comique in two acts by Gaetano Donizetti, set to a French libretto by Jules-Henri Vernoy de Saint-Georges and Jean-François Bayard. It was first performed on 11 February 1840 by the Paris Opéra-Comique at the Salle de la Bourse.

Donizetti wrote the opera while living in Paris between 1838 and 1840 and preparing a revised version of his then-unperformed Italian opera, Poliuto, as Les martyrs for the Paris Opéra. Since Martyrs was delayed, the composer had time to write the music for La fille du régiment, his first opera set to a French text, and to stage the French version of Lucia di Lammermoor, Lucie de Lammermoor.

La fille du régiment quickly became a popular success partly because of the famous aria "Ah! mes amis, quel jour de fête!", which requires the tenor to sing no fewer than eight high Cs – a frequently sung ninth is not written. La figlia del reggimento, a slightly different Italian-language version (in translation by Calisto Bassi), was adapted to the tastes of the Italian public.

== Performance history ==
=== Opéra-Comique premiere ===
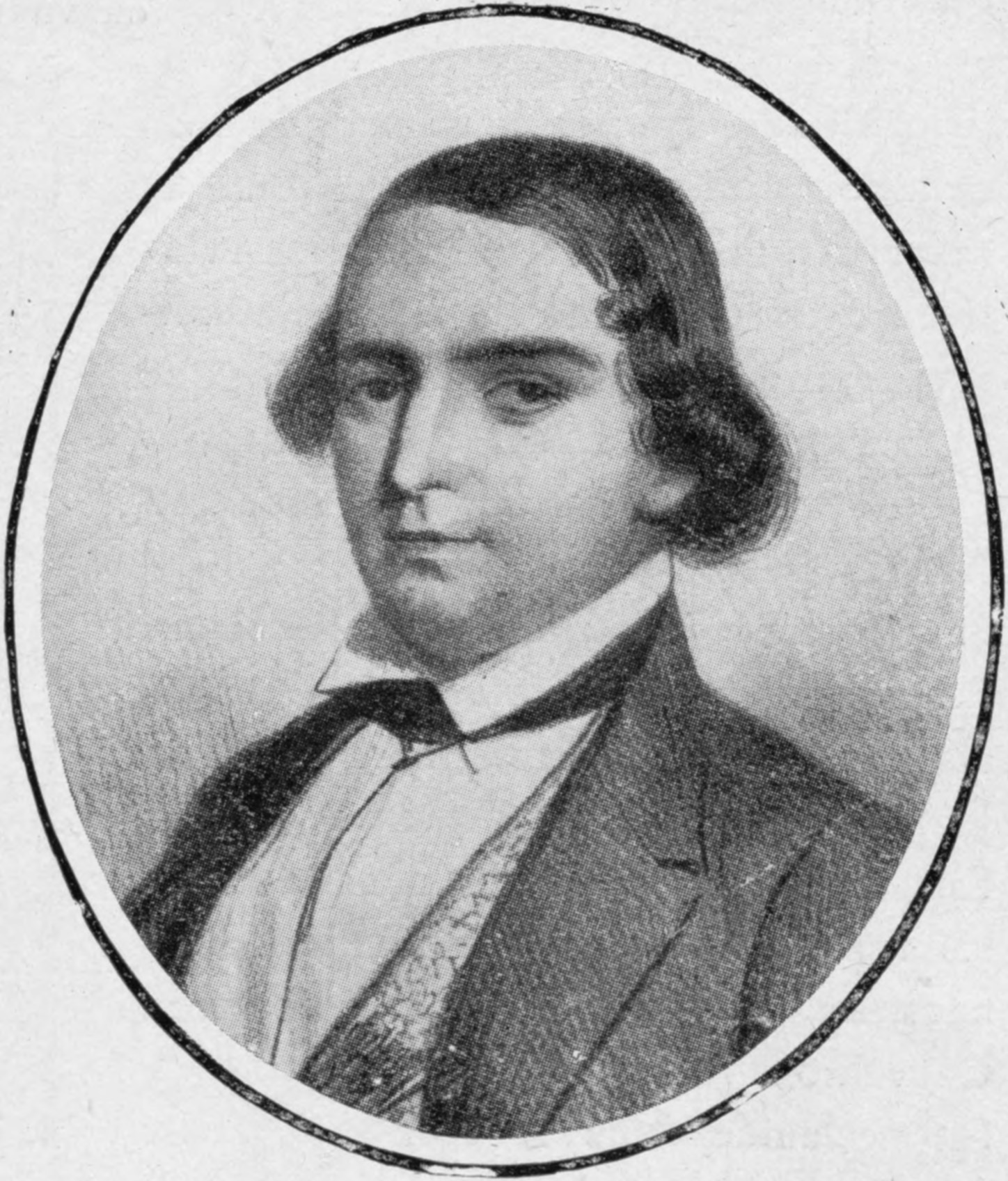
Mécène Marié de l'Isle sang Tonio.

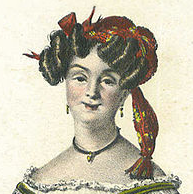
Marie–Julie Halligner sang The Marquise of Berkenfield.

The opening night was "a barely averted disaster." Apparently the lead tenor was frequently off pitch. The noted French tenor Gilbert Duprez, who was present, later observed in his Souvenirs d'un chanteur: "Donizetti often swore to me how his self-esteem as a composer had suffered in Paris. He was never treated there according to his merits. I myself saw the unsuccess, almost the collapse, of La fille du régiment."

It received a highly negative review from the French critic and composer Hector Berlioz (Journal des débats, 16 February 1840), who claimed it could not be taken seriously by the public or its composer, although Berlioz conceded that some of the music, "the little waltz that serves as the entr'acte and the trio dialogué ... lack neither vivacity nor freshness." The source of Berlioz's hostility is revealed later in his review:

What, two major scores for the Opéra, Les martyrs and Le duc d'Albe, two others at the Théâtre de la Renaissance, Lucie de Lammermoor and L'ange de Nisida, two at the Opéra-Comique, La fille du régiment and another whose title is still unknown, and yet another for the Théâtre-Italien, will have been written or transcribed in one year by the same composer! M[onsieur] Donizetti seems to treat us like a conquered country; it is a veritable invasion. One can no longer speak of the opera houses of Paris, but only of the opera houses of M[onsieur] Donizetti.

The critic and poet Théophile Gautier, who was not a rival composer, had a somewhat different point of view: "Donizetti is capable of paying with music that is beautiful and worthy for the cordial hospitality which France offers him in all her theatres, subsidized or not."

Despite its bumpy start, the opera soon became hugely popular at the Opéra-Comique. During its first 80 years, it reached its 500th performance at the theatre in 1871 and its 1,000th in 1908.

=== Outside France ===
The opera was first performed in Italy at La Scala, Milan, on 3 October 1840, in Italian with recitatives by Donizetti replacing the spoken dialogue. It was thought "worthless" and received only six performances. Only in 1928, when Toti Dal Monte sang Marie, did the opera begin to be appreciated in Italy.

La fille du régiment received its first performance in America on 7 March 1843 at the Théâtre d'Orléans in New Orleans. The New Orleans company premiered the work in New York City on 19 July 1843 with Julie Calvé as Marie. The Spirit of the Times (22 July) counted it a great success, reporting that, though the score was "thin" and not up to the level of Anna Bolena or L'elisir d'amore, some of Donizetti's "gems" were to be found in it. The Herald (21 July) was highly enthusiastic, especially in its praise of Calvé: "Applause is an inadequate term, ... vehement cheering rewarded this talented prima donna." Subsequently the opera was performed frequently in New York, the role of Marie being a favorite with Jenny Lind, Henriette Sontag, Pauline Lucca, Anna Thillon and Adelina Patti.

First given in England in Italian, it appeared on 27 May 1847 at Her Majesty's Theatre in London (with Jenny Lind and Luigi Lablache). Later—on 21 December 1847 in English—it was presented at the Surrey Theatre in London.

W. S. Gilbert wrote a burlesque adaptation of the opera, La Vivandière, in 1867.

In 1891 in Kronstadt during the Kronstadt-Toloun naval visits, Some 600 guests attended and entertainment included the singing of both countries' national anthems and the performance of the second act of this opera.

=== 20th century and beyond ===
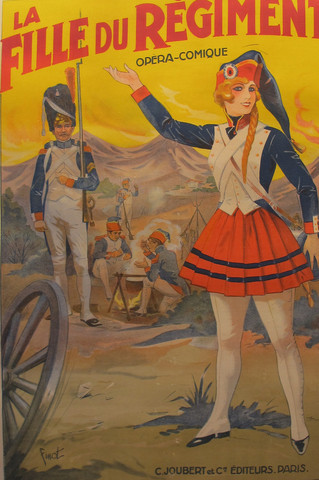
1910 poster for the opera by Emile Finot

The Metropolitan Opera gave the first performances with Marcella Sembrich and Charles Gilibert (Sulpice) during the 1902/03 season. These were followed by performances at the Manhattan Opera House in 1909 with Luisa Tetrazzini, John McCormack, and Charles Gilibert, and again with Frieda Hempel and Antonio Scotti in the same roles at the Met on 17 December 1917.

It was revived at the Royal Opera, London, in 1966 for Joan Sutherland. On 13 February 1970, in concert at Carnegie Hall, Beverly Sills sang the first performance in New York since Lily Pons performed it at the Metropolitan Opera House in 1943.

This opera is famous for the aria "Ah! mes amis, quel jour de fête ... Pour mon âme", which has been called the "Mount Everest" for tenors. The cabaletta "Pour mon âme" features eight high Cs (a ninth, frequently inserted, is not written). Luciano Pavarotti broke through to stardom via his 1972 performance alongside Sutherland at the Met, when, according to an obituary by James Naughtie in The Times, he "leapt over the 'Becher's Brook' of the string of high Cs with an aplomb that left everyone gasping."

It was performed at Wolf Trap Farm in the summer of 1974 with Beverly Sills as Marie in one of the first attempts to telecast an opera in the USA.

At a 20 February 2007 performance of the opera at La Scala, Juan Diego Flórez sang "Ah! mes amis", and then, by popular demand, repeated the "Pour mon âme" section with its nine high Cs, breaking a tradition against encores at La Scala that had lasted nearly 75 years. Flórez repeated this feat on 21 April 2008, the opening night of Laurent Pelly's production (which had been originally staged in 2007 at Covent Garden in London) at the Metropolitan Opera in New York, with Natalie Dessay as Marie; a live performance of this Met production, without an encore of "Pour mon âme", was cinecast via Metropolitan Opera Live in HD to movie theaters worldwide on 26 April 2008. In March 2018, in a filmed production of the opera at the National Centre for the Performing Arts (NCPA) in Beijing, Chinese tenor Yijie Shi (Chinese style: Shi Yijie) encored "Pour mon âme", singing 18 high Cs; the audio of this 2018 NCPA production was broadcast across the U.S. and elsewhere on the WFMT Radio Network Opera Series on 16 September 2023. On 3 March 2019, Mexican tenor Javier Camarena also sang an encore of the aria at the Met, singing 18 high Cs in a performance broadcast live worldwide via Metropolitan Opera radio and cinecast worldwide via Metropolitan Opera Live in HD.

As a non-singing role, the Duchess of Crakenthorp is often played by non-operatic celebrities, including actresses such as Dawn French, Bea Arthur, Hermione Gingold, Kathleen Turner and Sandra Oh, or by retired opera greats such as Kiri Te Kanawa and Montserrat Caballé. In 2016, US Supreme Court Justice Ruth Bader Ginsburg, a lifelong opera fan, played the Duchess on opening night of the Washington National Opera's production. In February 2023, the Duchess of Crakenthorp was re-tooled by the Minnesota Opera as a singing role and performed by American drag queen Monét X Change.

Today, the opera has become part of the standard repertoire.

=== Films ===
The opera was filmed in a silent film in 1929; a sound film with Anny Ondra in 1933 in German and separately in French; in 1953; and in 1962 with John van Kesteren as Tonio. It inspired the 1944 Mexican musical comedy film La hija del regimiento.

BBC Television broadcast a production from the Royal Opera House in 2007, conducted by Bruno Campanella, with Natalie Dessay and Juan Diego Flórez in the lead roles. This is available on DVD.

== Roles ==
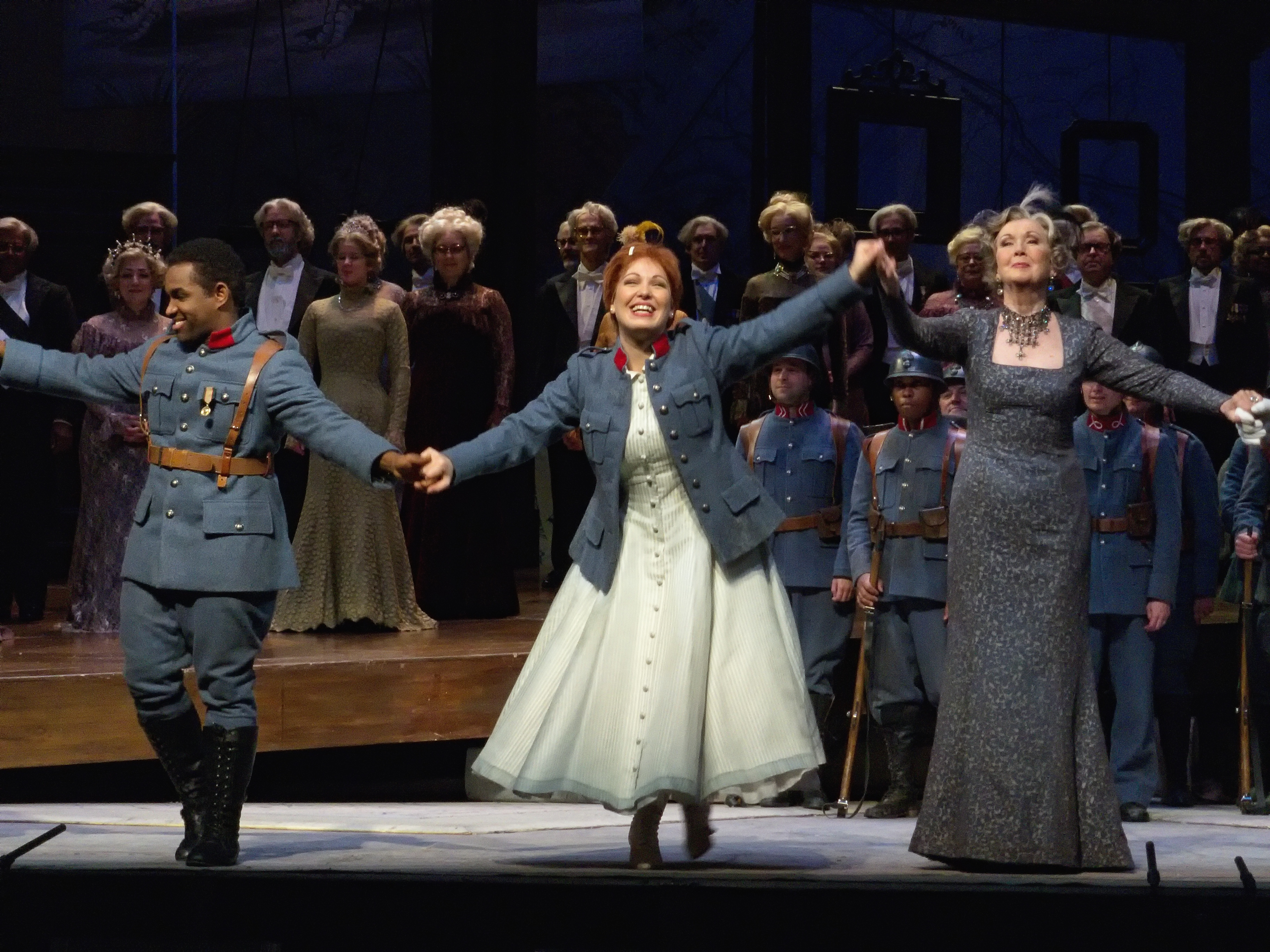
Final curtain call of the Metropolitan Opera's performance of 24 December 2011 with (l to r) Lawrence Brownlee (Tonio), Nino Machaidze (Marie), and Ann Murray (Marquise)

Roles, voice types, premiere cast
Role	Voice type	Premiere cast, 11 February 1840 Conductor: Gaetano Donizetti
Marie, a vivandière	coloratura soprano	Euphrasie Borghèse
Tonio, a young Tyrolean	tenor	Mécène Marié de l'Isle
Sergeant Sulpice	bass	François-Louis Henry ("Henri")
The Marquise of Berkenfield	contralto	Marie-Julie Halligner ("Boulanger")
Hortensius, a butler	bass	Edmond-Jules Delaunay-Ricquier
A corporal	bass	Georges-Marie-Vincent Palianti
A peasant	tenor	Henry Blanchard
The Duchess of Crakentorp	spoken role	Marguerite Blanchard
A notary	spoken role	Léon
French soldiers, Tyrolean people, domestic servants of the Duchess

== Synopsis ==
Time: The Napoleonic Wars, early 19th century
Place: The Swiss Tyrol

=== Act 1 ===
"Chacun le sait, chacun le dit ... Le beau vingt-et-unième!"
performed by l'Atelier Vocal des Herbiers and guitar accompaniment

War is raging in the Tyrols and the Marquise of Berkenfield, traveling in the area, is alarmed to the point of needing smelling salts to be administered by her faithful steward, Hortensius. While a chorus of villagers express their fear, the Marquise does the same: "Pour une femme de mon nom" / "For a lady of my family, what a time, alas, is wartime". As the French are seen moving away, all express relief. Suddenly, provoking the fear of the remaining women, who scatter, Sergeant Sulpice of the Twenty-First Regiment of the French army (in the Italian version it is the Eleventh) arrives and assures everyone that the regiment will restore order.

Marie, the vivandière (canteen girl) of the Regiment enters, and Sulpice is happy to see her (duet: Sulpice and Marie: "Mais, qui vient? Tiens, Marie, notre fille" / "But who is this? Well, well, if it isn't our daughter Marie"). After he questions her about a young man she has been seen with, she identifies him as Tonio, a Tyrolean (in the Italian version: Swiss). At that moment, Tonio is brought in as a prisoner because he has been seen prowling around the camp. Marie saves him from the soldiers, who demand that he die, by explaining that he saved her life when she nearly fell while mountain-climbing. All toast Tonio, who pledges allegiance to France, and Marie is encouraged to sing the regimental song (aria: "Chacun le sait, chacun le dit ... Le beau vingt-et-unième!" / "Everyone knows it, everyone says it ... The beautiful 21st"). Sulpice leads the soldiers off, taking Tonio with them, but he runs back to join her. She quickly tells him that he must gain the approval of her "fathers": the soldiers of the Regiment, who found her on the battlefield as an abandoned baby and adopted her. He proclaims his love for her (aria, then love duet with Marie: "Depuis l'instant où, dans mes bras" / "Ever since that moment when you fell and / I caught you, all trembling in my arms"), and the couple express their love for each other.

At that point, Sulpice returns, surprising the young couple, who leave. The Marquise arrives with Hortensius. Initially afraid of the soldier, she is calmed by him. The Marquise explains that they are trying to return to her castle and asks for an escort. Hearing the name Berkenfield, Sulpice immediately recognizes it from a letter found with Marie as an infant. It is discovered that Marie is actually the Marquise's long-lost niece. Marie returns and is surprised to be introduced to her aunt. The Marquise commands that Marie accompany her and learn to be a proper lady. Marie bids farewell to her beloved regiment just as Tonio enters announcing that he has enlisted in their ranks (aria: "Ah! mes amis, quel jour de fête" / "Ah, my friends, what an exciting day"). When he proclaims his love for Marie, the soldiers are horrified, but agree to his pleading for her hand. However, they tell him that she is about to leave with her aunt (Marie, aria: "Il faut partir" / "I must leave you!"). In a choral finale, she leaves with the Marquise and Tonio is enraged.

=== Act 2 ===
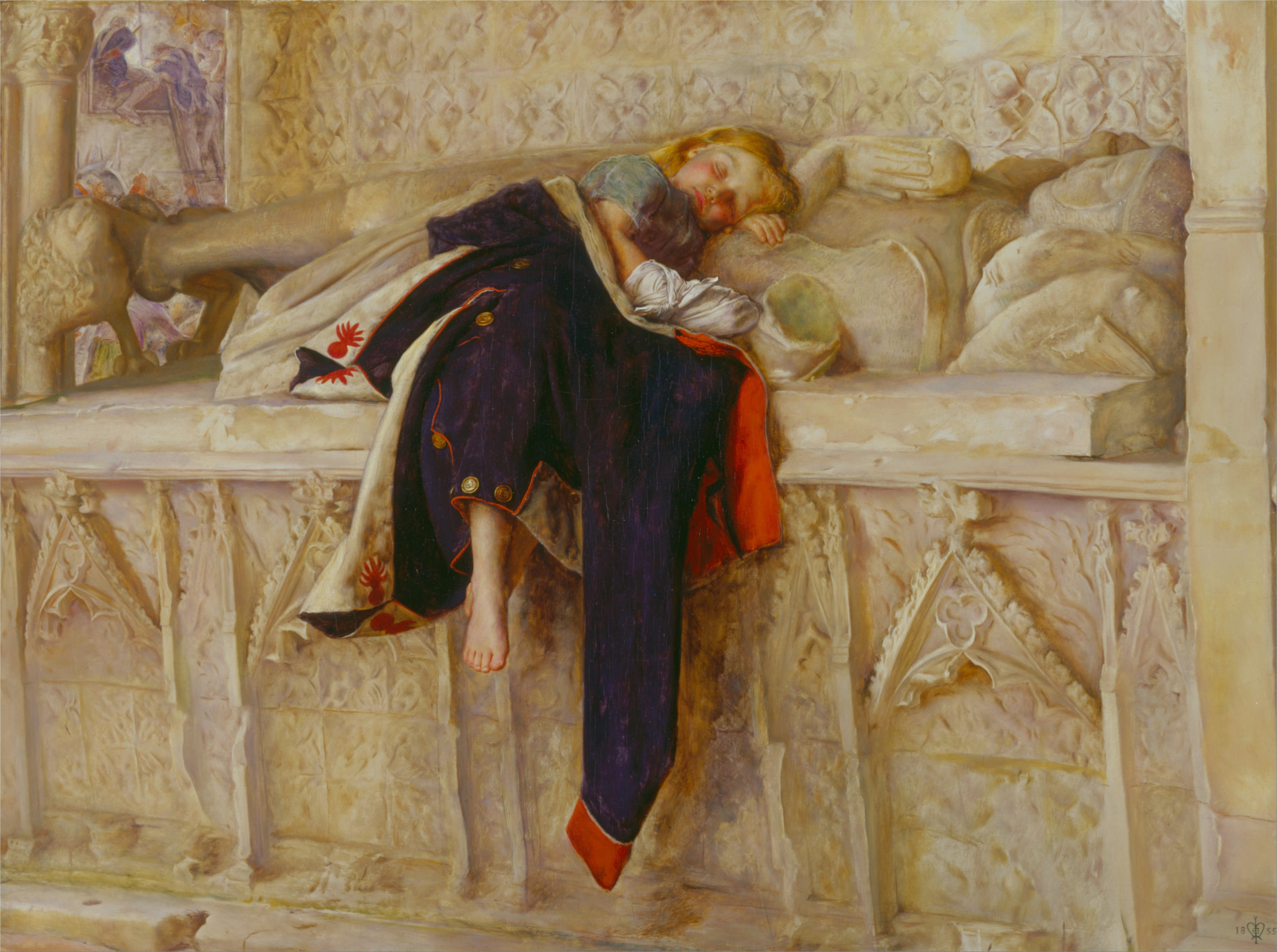
L'Enfant du Régiment by John Everett Millais, 1854–55, based on La fille du régiment. Yale Center for British Art, New Haven, Connecticut.

Marie has been living in the Marquise's castle for several months. In a conversation with Sulpice, the Marquise describes how she has sought to modify Marie's military manners and make her a lady of fashion, suitable to be married to her nephew, the Duke of Crakenthorp. Although reluctant, Marie has agreed and Sulpice is asked to encourage her. Marie enters and is asked to play the piano, but appears to prefer more martial music when encouraged by Sulpice and sings the regimental song. The Marquise sits down at the piano and attempts to work through the piece with Marie, who becomes more and more distracted and, along with Sulpice, takes up the regimental song.

Marie is left alone (aria: "Par le rang et par l'opulence" / "They have tried in vain to dazzle me"). As she is almost reconciled to her fate, she hears martial music and is joyously happy (cabaletta: "Oh! transport! oh! douce ivresse" / "Oh bliss! oh ectasy!"), and the regiment arrives. With it is Tonio, now an officer. The soldiers express their joy at seeing Marie, and Marie, Tonio and Sulpice are joyfully reunited (trio, Marie, Sulpice, Tonio: "Tous les trois réunis" / "We three are reunited"). Tonio says he has just learned a secret, via his uncle the burgermeister, that he cannot reveal.

The Marquise enters, horrified to see soldiers. Tonio asks the Marquise for Marie's hand, explaining that he risked his life for Marie (aria, Tonio: "Pour me rapprocher de Marie, je m'enrôlai, pauvre soldat" / "In order to woo Marie, I enlisted in the ranks"), but the Marquise dismisses him scornfully. Tonio reveals that he knows that the Marquise never had a niece. She orders him to leave and Marie to return to her chambers; after they leave, the Marquise confesses the truth to Sulpice: Marie is her own illegitimate daughter. Under the circumstances, Sulpice promises that Marie will agree to her mother's wishes.

The Duchess of Crakenthorp, her son the groom-to-be, and the wedding entourage arrive at the Marquise's castle. Marie enters with Sulpice, who has told her that the Marquise is her mother. Marie embraces her and decides she must obey. But at the last minute the soldiers of the Regiment storm in (chorus: soldiers, then Tonio: "Au secours de notre fille" / "Our daughter needs our help") and reveal that Marie was a canteen girl. The wedding guests are offended by that, but then impressed when Marie sings of her debt to the soldiers (aria, Marie: "Quand le destin, au milieu de la guerre" / "When fate, in the confusion of war, threw me, a baby, into their arms"). The Marquise is deeply moved, admits she is Marie's mother, and gives her consent to Marie and Tonio's marriage, amid universal rejoicing (final chorus: "Salut à la France!" / "Hurrah for France! For happy times!").

== Recordings ==
Year	Cast (Marie, Tonio, Sulpice, La Marquise)	Conductor, Opera house and orchestra	Label
1940	Lily Pons, Raoul Jobin, Salvatore Baccaloni, Irra Petina	Gennaro Papi Chorus and Orchestra of the Metropolitan Opera	CD: NAXOS Historical Cat: 8.110018-9
1950	Lina Pagliughi, Cesare Valletti, Sesto Bruscantini, Rina Corsi	Mario Rossi; RAI Milan orchestra and chorus	CD: Aura Music; Cat: LRC 1115
1960	Anna Moffo, Giuseppe Campora, Giulio Fioravanti, Iolande Gardino	Franco Mannino; RAI Milan orchestra and chorus	CD: GALA; Cat: 100713
1967	Joan Sutherland, Luciano Pavarotti, Spiro Malas, Monica Sinclair	Richard Bonynge; Royal Opera House orchestra and chorus	CD: Decca Originals; Cat: 478 1366
1970	Beverly Sills, Grayson Hirst, Fernando Corena, Muriel Costa-Greenspon	Roland Gagnon; American Opera Society; Carnegie Hall	CD: Opera d'Oro; Cat: B000055X2G
1974	Beverly Sills, William McDonald, Spiro Malas, Muriel Costa-Greenspon	Charles Wendelken-Wilson, Filene Center Orchestra, The Wolf Trap Company Chorus (Recorded live, Wolf Trap Farm; sung in English)	DVD: VAI; Cat: 4212
1986	June Anderson, Alfredo Kraus, Michel Trempont, Hélia T'Hézan	Bruno Campanella; Opéra National de Paris orchestra and chorus	VHS Video: Bel Canto Society; Cat: 628
1995	Edita Gruberová, Deon van der Walt, Philippe Fourcade, Rosa Laghezza	Marcello Panni; Munich Radio Orchestra; Chor des Bayerischer Rundfunk	CD: Nightingale; Cat: NC 070566-2
2007	Natalie Dessay, Juan Diego Flórez, Alessandro Corbelli, Felicity Palmer, Duchess: Dawn French	Bruno Campanella; Royal Opera House orchestra and chorus (Live recording on 27 January)	DVD: Virgin Classics; Cat: 5099951900298
2007	Natalie Dessay, Juan Diego Flórez, Carlos Álvarez, Janina Baechle, Duchess: Montserrat Caballé	Yves Abel; Vienna State Opera orchestra and chorus	CD: Unitel; Cat: A04001502
2008	Natalie Dessay, Juan Diego Flórez, Alessandro Corbelli, Felicity Palmer	Marco Armiliato; Metropolitan Opera	Streaming HD video: Met Opera on Demand
2019	Pretty Yende, Javier Camarena, Maurizio Muraro, Stephanie Blythe	Enrique Mazzola; Metropolitan Opera	Streaming HD video: Met Opera on Demand
