= Les diamants de la couronne =

Opera by Daniel Auber

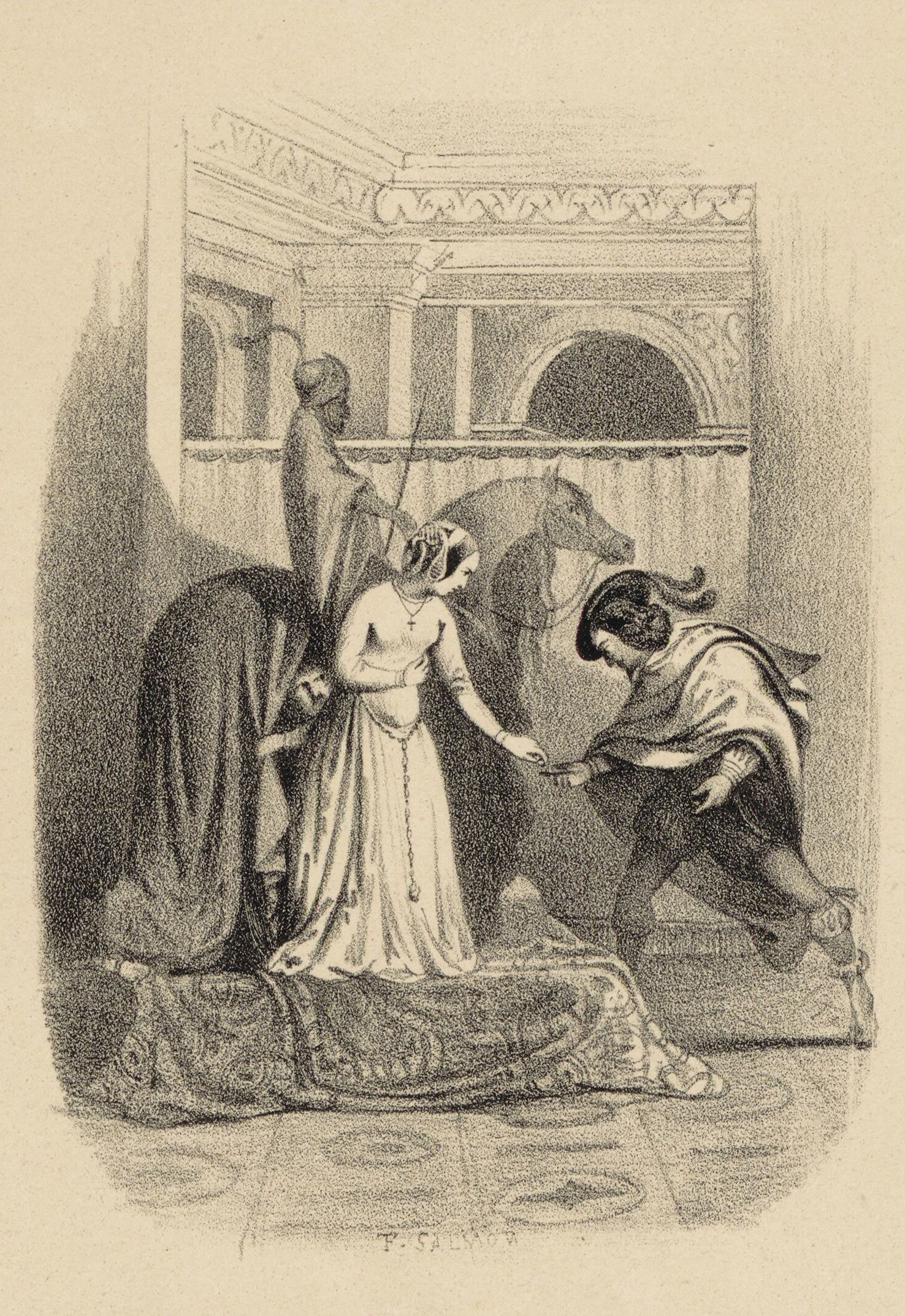
First production of Les Diamants de la couronne, 1841

Les diamants de la couronne (The Crown Diamonds) is an opéra comique by the French composer Daniel Auber, first performed by the Opéra-Comique at the second Salle Favart in Paris on 6 March 1841. The libretto (in three acts) is by Auber's regular collaborator, Eugène Scribe with the help of Jules-Henri Vernoy de Saint-Georges.

== Performance history ==
The opera was performed at the Opéra-Comique 379 times up to 1889, under the title Les diamants de la reine, and was revived in Marseilles on 20 March 1896.

Outside France it was first performed in Brussels on 25 November 1841, New Orleans on 31 March 1842, Munich on 15 July 1842 (in a German translation by V. A. Swoboda), Prague on 13 August 1842 (in German), Hamburg on 29 October 1842 (in German), Riga in 1843 (in German), Amsterdam in 1843 (in French), Berlin at the Hofoper on 11 February 1843 (in German), Copenhagen on 17 February 1843 (in a Danish translation by T. H. Reynoldson), New York City on 14 July 1843 (in French at Niblo's Opéra français with Julie Calvé), London at Princess's Theatre on 2 May 1844 (in an English translation by T. H. Reynoldson) and later at Covent Garden on 11 June 1845 (in French) and Drury Lane on 16 April 1846 (in a new English translation by E. Fitzball, with additional music by H. B. Richards and J. H. Tully).

It was first performed in Stockholm on 17 September 1845 (in a Swedish translation by N. E. W. af Wetterstedt), Rio de Janeiro in September 1846 (in French), Lemberg in 1848 (in German), Vienna on 25 January 1849 (in German), Buenos Aires on 11 April 1852 (in French), Boston in 1854 (in the English version by Fitzball), San Francisco in 1854 (in the English version by Fitzball), Turin on 3 April 1858 (in French), Sydney in August 1863 (in the English version from the Drury Lane Theatre), Barcelona on 20 October 1866 (in French), Saint Petersburg on 15 January 1876 (in Italian), Lisbon on 26 April 1878 (in French), at the Teatro Bellini, Naples, on 30 April 1879 (in an Italian translation by M. M. Marcello, with recitatives by E. Gelli), in Mexico on 8 May 1879 (in French), Budapest in 1880 (in a Hungarian translation by K. Abrányi), and Malta in 1890 (in Italian).

A version of the same story was composed as a zarzuela in three acts by Francisco Asenjo Barbieri with its libretto by Francisco Camprodón taken from the original by Scribe and Saint-Georges, and first performed in 1854.

== Roles ==
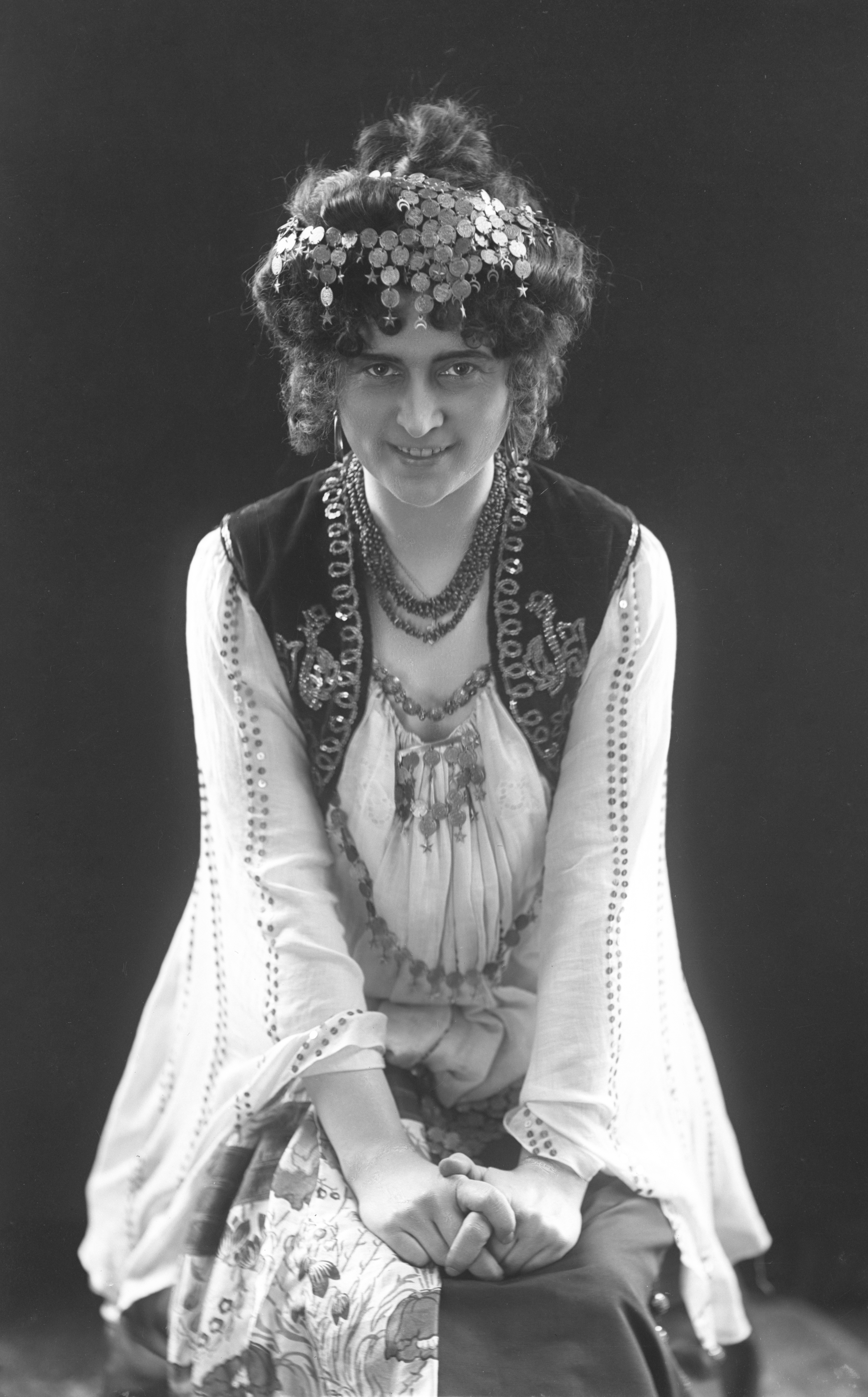
Paula Lizell as Catarina at the Royal Swedish Opera in 1905

Roles, voice types, premiere cast
Role	Voice type	Premiere cast, 6 March 1841
Catarina	soprano	Anna Thillon
Diana	soprano	Celestine Darcier
Don Henrique de Sandoval	tenor	Joseph-Antoine-Charles Couderc
Rebolledo	baritone	François-Louis-Ferdinand Henry
Don Sébastien d'Aveyro	tenor	Toussaint-Eugène-Ernest Mocker
Comte de Campo Mayor	tenor	Achille Ricquier
Mugnoz	tenor	Charles-Louis Sainte-Foy
Barbarigo	bass-baritone	Louis Palianti

== Synopsis ==
The plot concerns a Portuguese princess, Catarina, who intrigues with bandits after she is forced to sell the crown diamonds of the title.

== Recordings ==
- Les diamants de la couronne Ghyslaine Raphanel, Mylène Mornet, Christophe Einhorn, Orchestre de Picardie; Cori Spezzati, conducted by Edmon Colomer (Mandala, 2001)
