= François-Louis Henry =

French opera singer

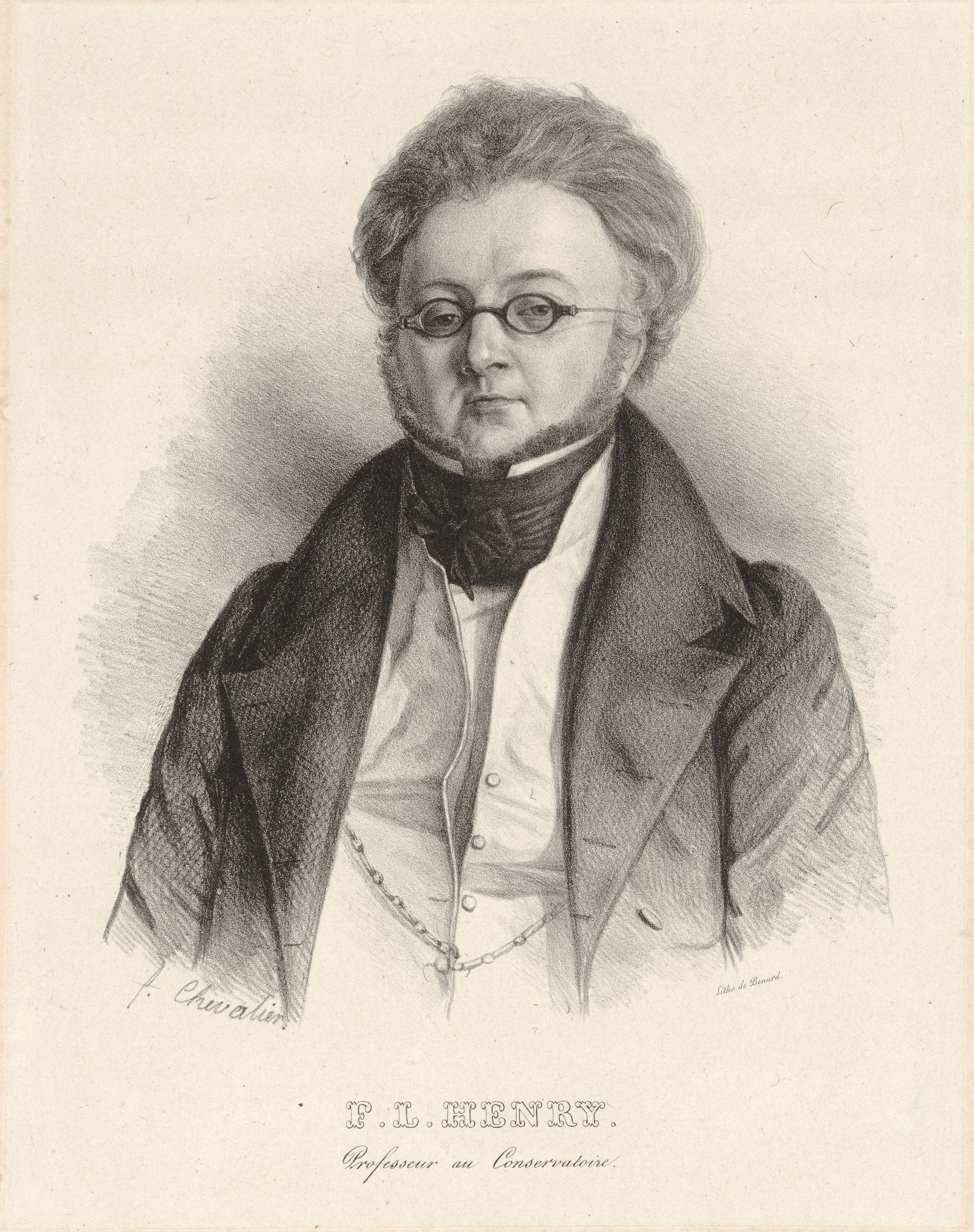
François-Louis Henry, 1835

François-Louis(-Ferdinand) Henry (12 May 1786 – 22 February 1855) was a French baritone, who sang for about 35 years with the Opéra-Comique in Paris, where he created numerous leading roles. His stage name was Henri (or Henry). He has also been referred to as François-Louis Deshayes.

== Birth and identity ==
He was born in Versailles with the family name of Deshayes. Relatively little is known about his life, and during his career at the Opéra-Comique he was only identified as Henry or Henri. However, it is as good as certain that he is identical with François-Louis Henry, who attended, and later taught at, the Conservatoire de Paris.

== Paris Conservatory ==
Henry first attended the conservatory as a supernumerary, beginning on 13 May 1803. He became a coach (répétiteur) without pay on 23 May 1808 and professor of singing preparation (préparation au chant) on 1 July, again without pay. He was a student of Charles Simon Catel, a professor of harmony, and won a second prize in harmony in 1810.

On 1 April 1816 Henry was appointed to a paid position as professor of vocalization (vocalisation). Among his students were Julie Dorus (c. 1821) and Cornélie Falcon (c. 1827–1828), who both later became leading sopranos at the Paris Opera. He became a professor of singing (chant) for a two-year trial (prior to 9 June 1835) and received his permanent position as professor of singing on 1 January 1837. He retired on 15 November 1842.

== Opéra-Comique ==
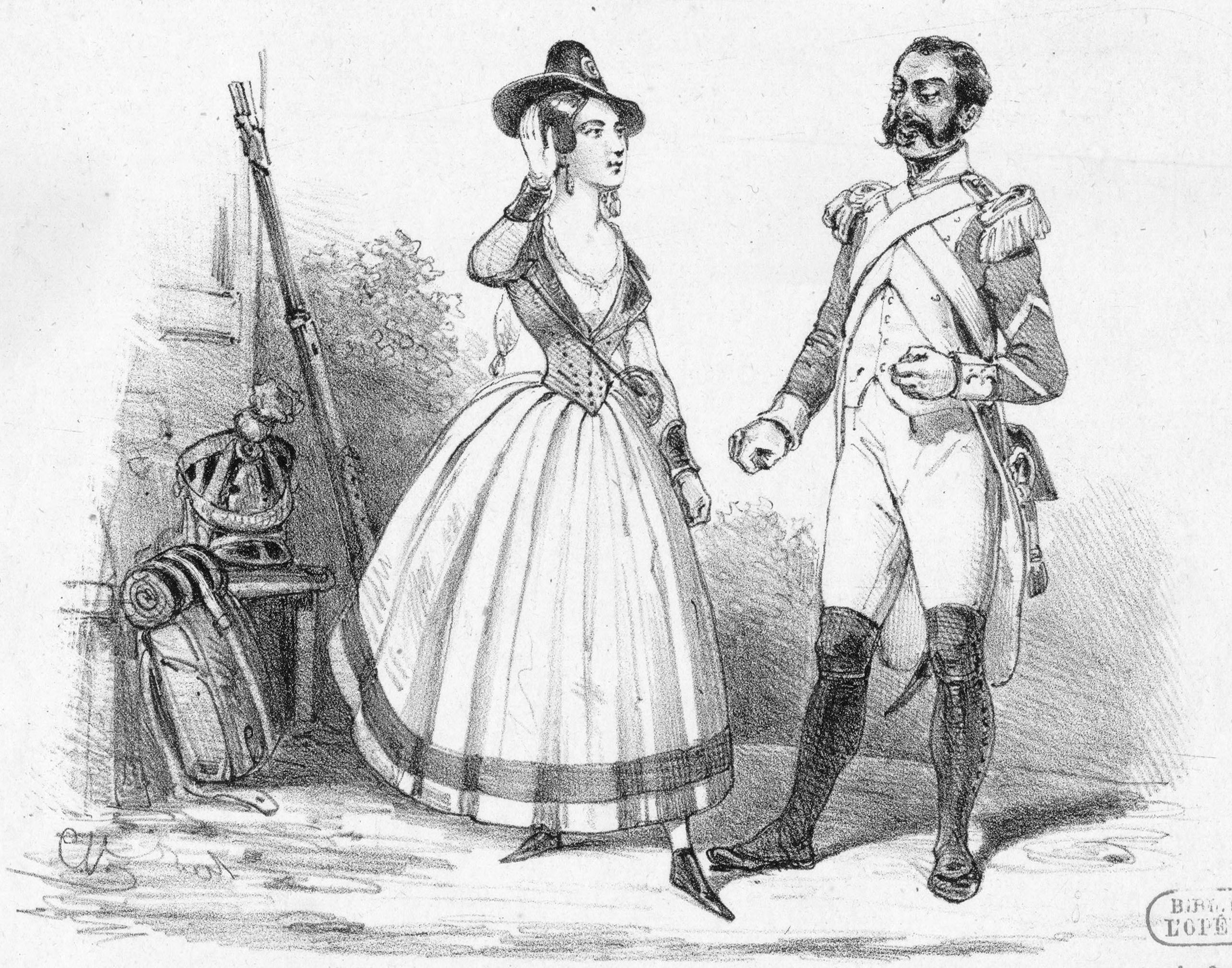
Henri as Sulpice (1840) and Euphrasie Borghèse as Marie in Donizetti's La fille du régiment

The first record of Henry having sung at the Opéra-Comique is on 29 June 1813 in the premiere of Boieldieu's opera Le nouveau seigneur de village. The singer's most noteworthy creations there included Gaveston in Boieldieu's La dame blanche (1825) and Sergeant Sulpice in Donizetti's La fille du régiment (1840). He also sang at the premiere of George Onslow's opera Le duc de Guise. He continued to appear regularly with the company until 1849.

On 6 December 1846 Henry sang Brander in the premiere of Berlioz's La damnation de Faust, a concert performance at the Opéra-Comique conducted by the composer. He also sang the role under Berlioz on 15 March 1847 at the Mikhaylovsky Theatre in Saint Petersburg, 18 April 1847 at the Maly Theatre in Moscow, and 10 June 1847 at the Neues Königliches Schauspielhaus in Berlin.

After about 1845 Henry was also active as a stage director at the Opéra-Comique. His stagings included the premieres of Halévy's 3-act Les mosquetaires de la reine on 3 February 1846, Xavier Boisselot's 3-act Ne touchez pas à la reine! on 16 January 1847, Halévy's 3-act Le val d'Andorre on 11 November 1848, and Armand Limnander's 3-act Les Monténégrins on 31 March 1849.

Henry's farewell performance was in 1850 (after his official retirement), when he performed Fortunatus in Auber's L'ambassadrice.

He died in Paris.

== Roles created ==
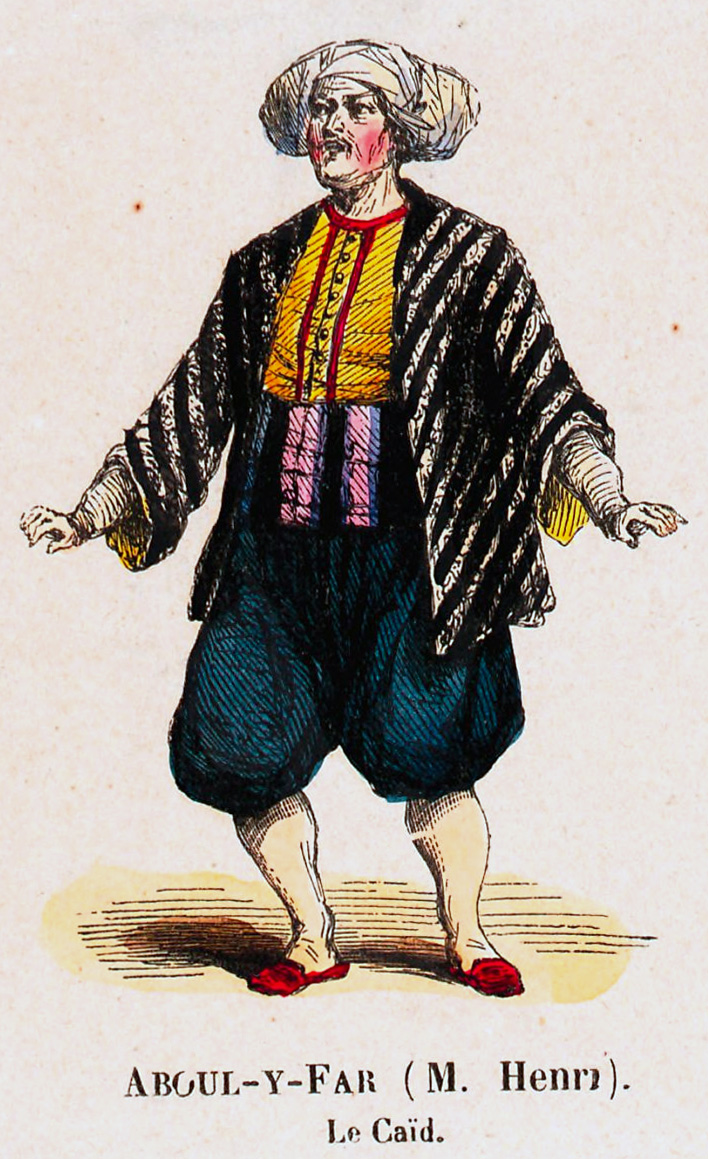
Henri as Aboul-y-far in Le caïd, 1849

Date	Role	Opera	Composer	Ref
29 June 1813		Le nouveau seigneur de village	François-Adrien Boieldieu	
5 March 1816		La fête du village voisin	François-Adrien Boieldieu	
18 October 1817		La clochette	Ferdinand Hérold	
25 January 1823	Lord Hudson	Leicester	Daniel Auber	
3 May 1825	Rica	Le maçon	Daniel Auber	
10 December 1825	Gaveston	La dame blanche	François-Adrien Boieldieu	
12 August 1826		Marie	Ferdinand Hérold	
28 January 1830	Mathéo	Fra Diavolo	Daniel Auber	
14 February 1831	corsaire	La veillée	Alexandre Paris	
24 May 1834	Golofkin	Lestocq ou L'intrigue et l'amour	Daniel Auber	
13 October 1835	Faribolini	Cosimo ou le peintre badigeonneur	Eugène Prévost	
9 April 1836	Gilbert	Les chaperons blanc	Daniel Auber	
13 October 1836	Biju	Le postillon de Lonjumeau	Adolphe Adam	
8 September 1837	Larchant	Guise ou les états de Blois	George Onslow	
21 March 1838	négociant	Lequel? ou Le fils et orphelin	Aimé Leborne	
30 March 1838	Pierre-le-Grand	Le perruquier de la Régence	Ambroise Thomas	
18 June 1838	Maître Birminstel	Marguerite	Adrien-Louis Boieldieu	
31 October 1838	Sergeant Toby	Le brasseur de Preston	Adolphe Adam	
15 November 1838	John Porter	Lady Melvil, ou Le joaillier de Saint-James	Albert Grisar	
15 April 1839	3rd Neapolitan	Les treize	Fromental Halévy	
14 June 1839	Bambolino Bambolini	Polichinelle	Alexandre Montfort	
2 September 1839	Sheriff Turner	Le shérif	Fromental Halévy	
11 February 1840	Sergeant Sulpice	La fille du régiment	Gaetano Donizetti	
6 March 1841	Rebolledo	Les diamants de la couronne	Daniel Auber	
8 August 1841	Marcelin	Camille ou le souterrain (revival)	Nicolas Dalayrac	
17 August 1841		L'aïeule	Adrien-Louis Boieldieu	
1 December 1841	Doctor Magnus	La jeunesse de Charles-Quint	Alexandre Montfort	
17 January 1842	Babylas	Le diable à l'école	Ernest Boulanger	
4 February 1842	Mugnoz	Le duc d'Olonne	Daniel Auber	
20 April 1843	Sheriff Bolbury	Le puits d'amour	Michael William Balfe	
14 September 1843	John-Bred	Lambert Simnel	Hippolyte Monpou	
10 February 1844	Tomassi	Cagliostro	Adolphe Adam	
26 March 1844	Bolbaya	La sirène	Daniel Auber	
10 February 1845	Shepherd	Les bergers trumeaux	Louis Clapisson	
9 August 1845	Major Krifkraffen	Le ménétrier ou Les deux duchesses	Théodore Labarre	
15 May 1846	Goulard	Le trompette de Monsieur le Prince	François Bazin	
19 November 1846	Lord Catesby	Gibby la cornemuse	Louis Clapisson	
11 November 1848	Grand Syndic	Le val d'Andorre	Fromental Halévy	
3 January 1849	Aboul-y-far	Le caïd	Ambroise Thomas	

== Bibliography ==
- Casaglia, Gherardo (2005)."Henry Deshaynes". L'Almanacco di Gherardo Casaglia (in Italian).
- Kutsch, K. J. and Riemens, Leo (2003). Großes Sängerlexikon (fourth edition, in German). Munich: K. G. Saur. ISBN 978-3-598-11598-1.
- Pierre, Constant, editor (1900). Le Conservatoire national de musique et de déclamation. Documents historiques et administratifs. Paris: Imprimerie Nationale. 1031 pages. View at Google Books.
- Pitou, Spire (1990). The Paris Opéra: An Encyclopedia of Operas, Ballets, Composers, and Performers. Growth and Grandeur, 1815–1914. New York: Greenwood Press. ISBN 978-0-313-26218-0.
- Warrack, John and West, Ewan (1992). The Oxford Dictionary of Opera. Oxford: Oxford University Press. ISBN 978-0-19-869164-8.
- Wild, Nicole; Charlton, David (2005). Théâtre de l'Opéra-Comique Paris: répertoire 1762-1972. Sprimont, Belgium: Editions Mardaga. ISBN 978-2-87009-898-1.
