= Le nabab =

Three-act opéra comique by Fromental Halévy

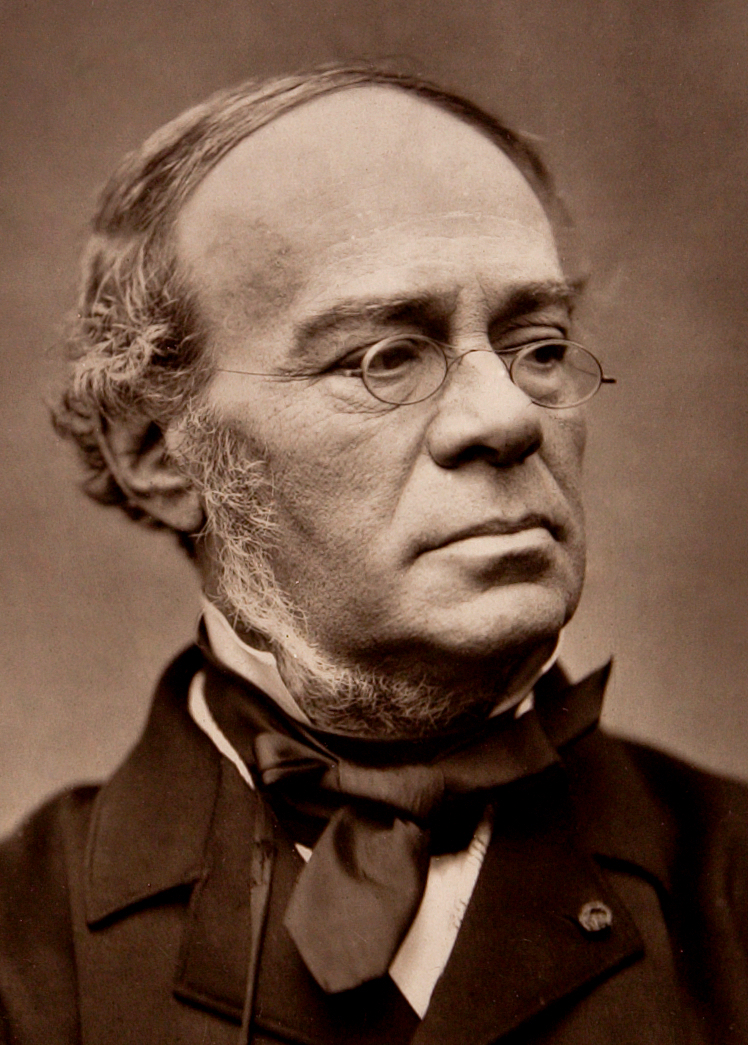
Fromental Halévy (c. 1860–62), by Étienne Carjat

Le nabab is a three-act opéra comique by Fromental Halévy to a libretto by Eugène Scribe.

The title refers to a Nawab or Indian notable. The opera was the last collaboration of Scribe and Halévy, which began in 1835 with La Juive, Halévy's greatest success. It premiered in Paris on 1 September 1853.

The opera had 38 performances and appears not to have been revived.

== Roles ==
- Dora soprano – Caroline Miolan-Carvalho
- Lord Evendale tenor – Charles-Auguste-Marie Ponchard
- Clifford baritone – Joseph-Antoine-Charles Couderc

== Synopsis ==
Place: India and England
Time:

The Commissioner, Lord Evendale, bored with his life and especially with his wife, contemplates suicide. His doctor suggests he take a year's sabbatical. Before he leaves for England, Evendale arranges for the passage to England of Dora, an orphan girl.

In England, Evendale works in disguise for Dora's uncle and wins her heart. In the third act, it is revealed that Lady Evendale had married Evendale's doctor in their youth. Her bigamy frees Evendale to marry Dora.
