= Anna Thillon =

Opera singer

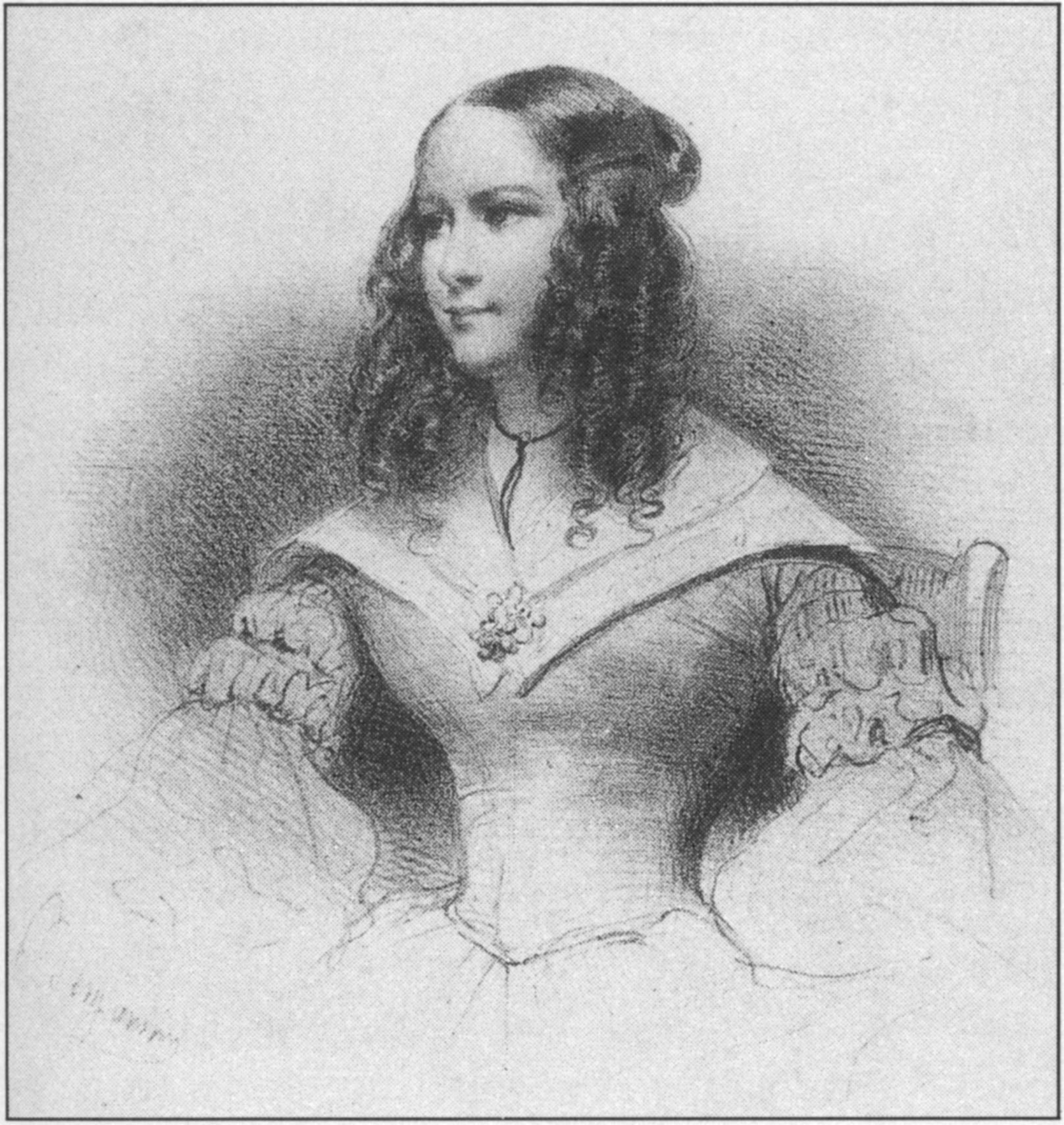
Anna Thillon

Sophie Anne Hunt, known by the name of Anna Thillon, (1819, Calcutta or London – 5 May 1903, Torquay) was an operatic singing sensation in the United States, based in San Francisco, California and then New York, New York. She performed in the former city's first professional season.

Her parents were Elisabeth and Joseph Hunt.

Mrs. Hunt came from a noble family, thanks to which, for her daughter, all the doors of aristocratic houses were opened.

Mr. Hunt was a rich merchant, possibly also from a noble family, as The Musical World of 1840 states that Sophie Ann Hunt belonged to one of the aristocratic families of England. However, by her 14th birthday, Mr. Hunt went bankrupt, prompting Mrs. Hunt to take her daughters to France.

Sophie Ann Hunt had much of her training in France where she studied with Marco Bordogni, Giovanni Tadolini and Claude Thomas Thillon, conductor of the Havre Philharmonic Society, whom she married. After appearances in the provinces, she made her debut at the Paris Théâtre de la Renaissance in 1838 in the title role of Albert Grisar's Lady Melvil. In 1840 she moved to the Opéra-Comique where she created the roles of Catarina in Les diamants de la couronne (1841) and Casilda in La part du diable (1843) by Daniel Auber, who had a passion for her. She made her English debut in 1844 at the London Princess's Theatre, repeating the role of Catarina. She later sang at the Drury Lane creating Stella in Balfe's The Enchantress. Her American career began in 1851 but she retired four years later.

Around 1840–1855, the artist Henry Willard painted an oil portrait of her.

After retiring early, she lived in Torquay and died there as a widow at 84, with no record of children.

She had at least two sisters, Elizabeth Victoria Hunt and Mary Charlotte Hunt (1825-1913). Mary Charlotte Hunt in 1845 met a Georgian prince from the Bagration-Davydov family (Bagration-Davitishvili), married him, becoming Princess Mariya Iosifovna Bagration-Davydova, went to the Russian Empire, where she died at an advanced age.
