= Joseph-Antoine-Charles Couderc =

French opera singer

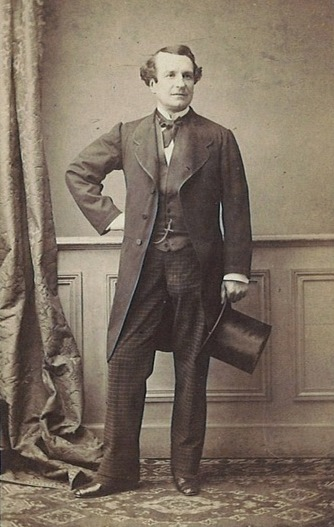
- Born: 10 March 1810; Toulouse, France
- Died: 16 April 1875 (aged 65); Paris, France
- Occupation: Opera singer

Joseph-Antoine-Charles Couderc (10 March 1810 – 16 April 1875) was a French operatic tenor (and later baritone) prominent on the stages of the Opéra Comique in Paris where he created numerous roles.

== Life and career ==
Couderc was born in Toulouse where his father had a grocery shop. He was working in his father's business when Louis Benoît Alphonse Révial (1810-1871) a tenor from Toulouse already studying at the Conservatoire de Paris convinced him to study singing and facilitated his entry to the conservatory in 1830. After studying singing there under Louis Nourrit, Couderc made his debut as Rodolphe in Boieldieu's Le petit chaperon de rouge at the Opéra-Comique in 1834. He created several roles with the company between 1834 and 1841 and was greatly admired for his acting ability. He sang in Belgium from 1842 until 1850 when he returned to the Opéra-Comique where he remained for the rest of his career singing leading tenor and later baritone roles.

One of Couderc's last role creations was that of Baladon in Jacques Offenbach's Vert-Vert in March 1869. He was originally to have sung the role of the Prince in the premiere of Offenbach's Fantasio the following year. Rehearsals had begun in early 1870, but were suspended when the outbreak of the Franco-Prussian War caused the closure of the Paris theatres. When the opera finally premiered in 1872, Couderc had retired from the stage. In his later years he taught at the Paris Conservatory. He died in Paris at the age of 65.

== Roles created ==
Roles created by Couderc include:

- Daniel in Adam's Le chalet (1834)
- George in Halévy's L'éclair (1835)
- Benedict in Auber's L'ambassadrice (1836)
- Horace de Massarena in Auber's Le domino noir (1837)
- Péricart in Onslow's Le duc de Guise (1837)
- Henrique de Sandoval in Auber's Les diamants de la couronne (1841)
- Shakespeare in Thomas's Le songe d'une nuit d'été (1850)
- Clifford in Halévy's Le nabab (1853)
- Jean in Massé's Les noces de Jeannette (1853)
- Lanskoi in Auber's La circassienne (1861)
- Laerte in Thomas's Mignon (1866)
- Baladon in Offenbach's Vert-Vert (1869)
