= Paula Lizell =

Swedish operatic soprano

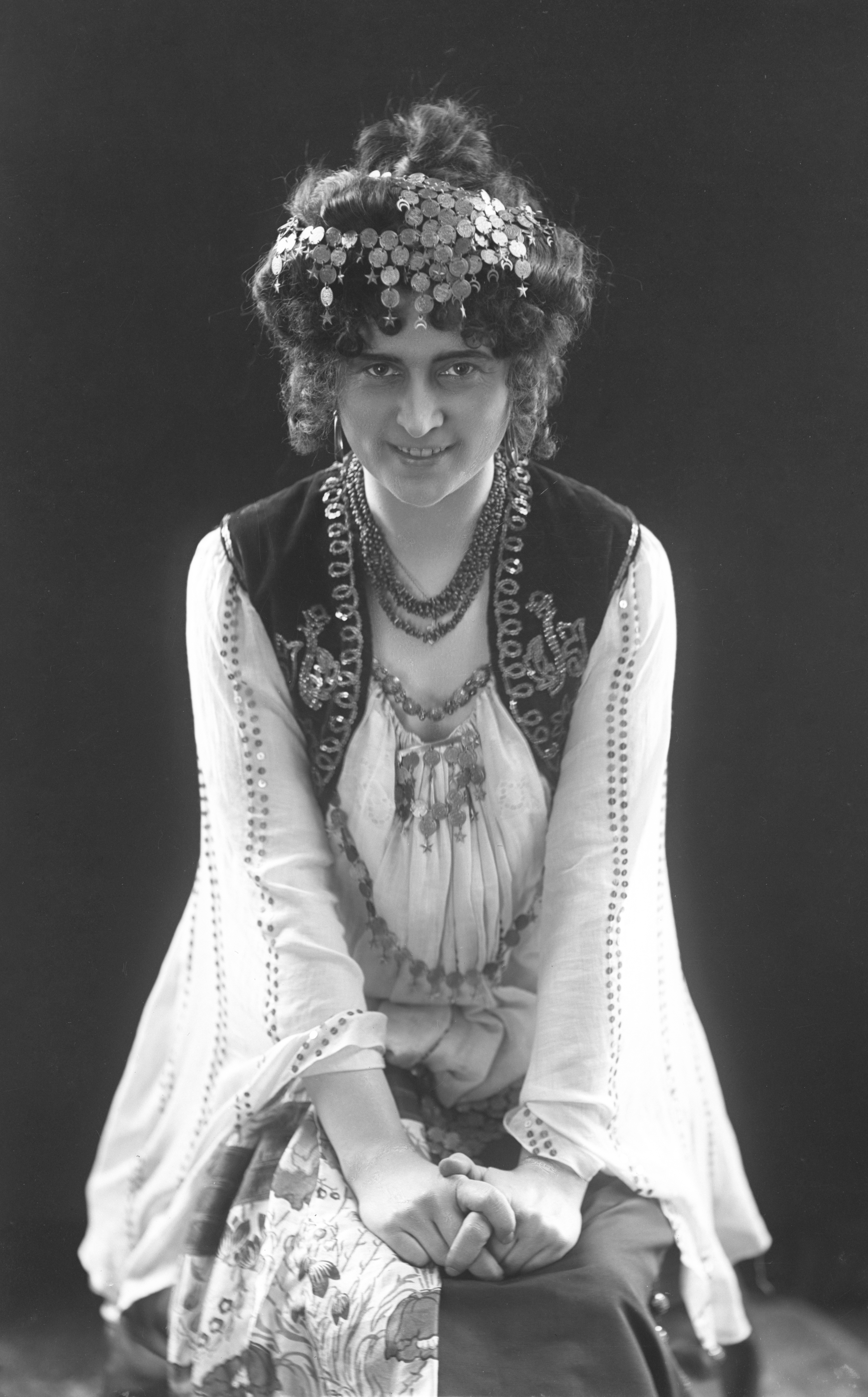
- Paula Lizell in the Swedish language version of Daniel Auber's Les Diamants de la couronne (1905)
- Born: Paula Maria Frödin; 25 January 1873; Stockholm, Sweden
- Died: 12 January 1962 (aged 88); Stockholm
- Occupation: Operatic soprano
- Organization: Royal Swedish Opera
- Awards: Litteris et Artibus

Paula Maria Lindberg Lizell née Frödin (1873–1962) was a Swedish operatic soprano. She made her debut in 1893 at the Royal Swedish Opera as Mathilde in Rossini's William Tell, becoming one of the company's leading sopranos until she retired from the stage in 1911. After first appearing in coloratura roles, she sang in more dramatic works such as the Wagnerian operas where she appeared as Senta and Sieglinde. She later worked as a drama teacher for singers.

== Early life, family and education ==
Born in Stockholm on 25 January 1873, Paula Maria Frödin was the daughter of the investor Johan Frödin and his wife Johanna Maria née Landberg. She was first married to the physician Hakon Lindberg from 1897 to 1905. In 1927 she married the music teacher Sven Olof Lizell (1877–1935).

She studied music under Otto Lindblad (1882), voice under Carolina Östberg and Louise Pyk (1888) and drama under Signe Hebbe (1891).

== Career ==
Lizell in 1907

Paula Frödin made her debut at the Royal Swedish Opera in 1893 as Mathilde in Rossini's William Tell. After initially performing mostly coloratura roles, she appeared as Guilmelle in Jacopo Foroni's operetta Advokaten Patelin and as Marguerite in Meyerbeer's Les Huguenots. Thereafter, thanks to her charm, her high register and her well developed stagecraft, she appeared in leading dramatic soprano roles, including Margareta in Gounod's Faust, Senta in Wagner's Der fliegende Holländer, Sieglinde in Die Walküre and Eva in Die Meistersinger von Nürnberg.

She later worked as a drama teacher at Richard Andersson's music school in Stockholm. From 1922–31, she was a supervisor at the Royal Theatre's opera school.

Paula Lizell died in Stockholm on 12 January 1962 and is buried in Norra begravningsplatsen.

== Awards ==
For her contributions to Swedish culture, Paula Lizell was awarded the Litteris et Artibus medal in 1934.
