= La part du diable =

Opera by Daniel Auber

- Opéra comique by Daniel Auber
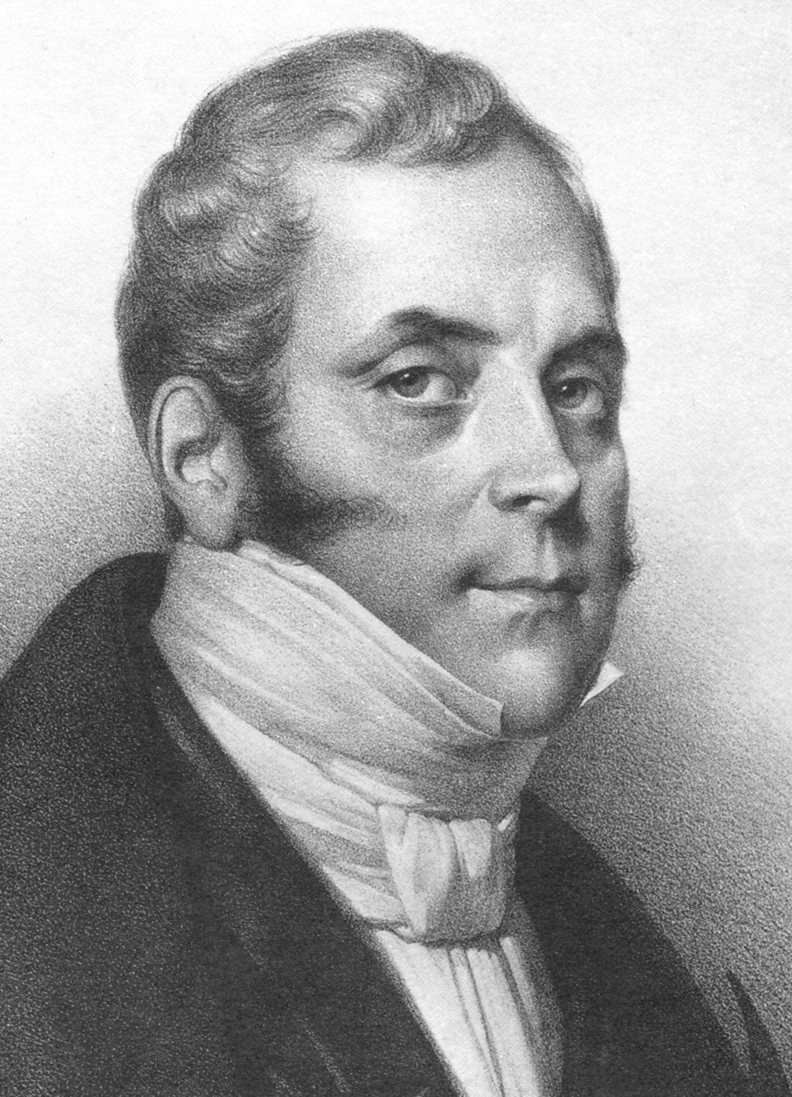
- The composer c. 1825
- Librettist: Eugène Scribe
- Language: French
- Premiere: 16 January 1843; Opéra-Comique, Paris

La part du diable ("The Devil's Share," also known by the English title Carlo Broschi) is an opéra comique by Daniel Auber to a libretto by Eugène Scribe, loosely based on an incident from the life of the singer Farinelli. It premiered at the Opéra-Comique on 16 January 1843. The original production starred Sophie Anne Thillon and Celeste Darcier alternating in the role of Casilda.

== Roles ==
Role	Voice type	Premiere Cast, 16 January 1843 (Conductor: – )
Casilda	soprano	Anna Thillon
Rafaël d'Estuniga	tenor	Gustave-Hippolyte Roger
Ferdinando VI of Spain	bass	Grard
Gil Vargas	tenor	Edmond-Jules Delaunay-Ricquier
Carlo Broschi	soprano	Giovanna "Juana" Rossi-Caccia
Maria Theresia of Portugal	contralto	Antoinette-Jeanne Révilly
Count Medrano	bass	Louis Palianti
Fray Antonio	bass	Victor

== Synopsis ==
The minstrel Carlo Broschi has hidden his sister Casilda in a convent to protect her from the machinations of the clergy who wish to make a present of her for King Ferdinand VI. In Carlo's opinion, she is in love with an unknown cavalier- likewise too highborn to have any lawful intentions toward her. Carlo happens upon the King, who is possessed by melancholy and succeeds in cheering him with a song. As a reward, he is invited to the court, where he encounters his sister's lover, Raphael d'Estuniga. Raphael is so despondent over his thwarted passion that he is ready to sell his soul, so Carlo introduces himself as Satan, ready to lend aid for half of his takings.

Casilda appeals to Carlo for protection; she has been kidnapped by the priests and brought to the king, who, only recently having recovered his sanity, takes her for a ghost. Carlo leaves to speak with the queen and leaves the lovers alone. Raphael, who has obtained an office due to Carlo's influence and has had uncommon luck at gambling, is so confident of supernatural aid that he is nonplussed at the king's entrance, even when the latter orders his death. Carlo attempts to smooth things over by telling the king Raphael is her husband, but the Grand Inquisitor exposes the fabrication, enraging the king against Carlo as well. Things can only be put right by Carlo's revealing all and reminding the king that the queen still suspects nothing. Carlo, who has never hesitated to claim his 50%, tells his future brother-in-law that his share will be Casilda's happiness this time.
