= Muriel Costa-Greenspon =

American mezzo-soprano

- Born: Muriel Salina Greenspon; December 1, 1937; Detroit, Michigan, U.S.
- Died: December 26, 2005 (aged 68); New York City, U.S.
- Education: University of Michigan
- Occupation: Singer

Muriel Salina Costa-Greenspon (née Greenspon; December 1, 1937 – December 26, 2005) was an American mezzo-soprano who had a lengthy career at the New York City Opera from 1963 to 1993.

She portrayed a gallery of character roles that extended from twentieth-century works by Leonard Bernstein, Benjamin Britten, Carlisle Floyd, Lee Hoiby, Arthur Honegger, Gian Carlo Menotti, and Douglas Moore, to the contralto heroines of Gilbert and Sullivan, and comic scene-stealers by Puccini, Mozart, and Donizetti.

== Biography ==
Born Muriel Salina Greenspon in Detroit to Edward and Ruth Greenspon, who were deaf. She attended Cass Technical High School and later to the University of Michigan, Ann Arbor, where she earned bachelor's (1959) and master's (1960) degrees in vocal performance. She studied voice under Joseph Blatt at the University of Michigan and later with Sam Morgenstern in New York City.

She made her professional debut with the Detroit Grand Opera Association at the Detroit Opera House as Miss Todd in The Old Maid and the Thief in 1960. Over the next decade she appeared with numerous opera companies around the United States, including performances at the Baltimore Opera Company, the Opera Company of Boston, the Connecticut Opera, the Dallas Opera, the Houston Grand Opera, the Philadelphia Grand Opera Company, and the San Antonio Grand Opera Festival among others.

In 1963 Greenspon joined the roster at the New York City Opera, beginning her tenure with the company portraying Olga Olsen in Kurt Weill's Street Scene. Her repertoire with the company eventually encompassed a total of forty-five roles. She participated in some of the company's landmark productions of the 1960s and 1970s, including Frank Corsaro's La traviata (as Flora Bervoix, with Patricia Brooks), as well as Tito Capobianco's production of Le coq d'or (as Amelfa) and Corsaro's Faust (as Marthe), both opposite Beverly Sills and Norman Treigle. Also in her repertoire were Geneviève in Debussy's Pelléas et Mélisande, Dame Quickly in Sarah Caldwell's production of Verdi's Falstaff, Frau von Luber in Weill's Der Silbersee, and the name part in Offenbach's La Grande-Duchesse de Gérolstein. In 1982, she was seen as the Old Lady when the City Opera televised their production of Candide over PBS.

Costa-Greenspon took on leading roles for NYCO in the American premieres of Prokofiev’s The Fiery Angel (1965) and von Einem's Dantons Tod (1966), and the 1964 world-premiere of Hoiby's Natalia Petrovna (A Month in the Country). She portrayed Katisha in The Mikado "with the right mixture of menace and pathos." Her last performance with the company was as Grand Duchess Anastasia in The Student Prince (1993).

Aside from her work with the New York City Opera, she occasionally traveled to perform with other opera companies. In 1970 she sang Ulrica in Verdi's Un ballo in maschera at the New Orleans Opera with Plácido Domingo and Cornell MacNeil. That same year she made her debut at the Lyric Opera of Chicago portraying Zita in Gianni Schicchi and returned to the Opera Company of Boston to sing the Fisherman's Wife in the world premiere of Gunther Schuller's The Fisherman and His Wife.

In 1973 she sang the role of La marquise de Berkenfield in La fille du régiment at the Philadelphia Lyric Opera Company with Beverly Sills as Marie and Enrico di Giuseppe as Tonio.

Another notable production that year was of The Medium in Detroit. Costa-Greenspon portrayed Madame Flora, and Sal Mineo both directed and took the part of the mute, Toby. Menotti, who was an admirer of Costa-Greenspon, later invited her to sing Madame Flora at the Spoleto Festival in 1975.

In 1983 Costa-Greenspon and her husband Giorgio Costa, a carpenter for the Metropolitan Opera, enjoyed a brief burst of extra-musical fame when they won $1.7 million in the state lottery. The winnings did not cause her to abandon City Opera, however; she continued to perform with the company through 1993 when she retired from singing. In 1995, Costa-Greenspon made her only appearance at the Metropolitan Opera, as the Duchesse of Krakentorp, a speaking role, in La fille du régiment with June Anderson as Marie and Luciano Pavarotti as Tonio.

== Last years and death ==
After retiring from the stage, Costa-Greenspon served on the faculty of the prestigious Bronx High School of Science. She died on December 26, 2005, aged 68, in New York City. Her death was due to natural causes, according to her son, Stefano Costa, who, along with her husband, Giorgio, were her immediate survivors.

== Videography ==
- Donizetti: La fille du régiment (Sills, McDonald, Malas; Wendelken-Wilson, Mansouri, 1974; live, VAI)
