= Eugène de Planard =

French playwright

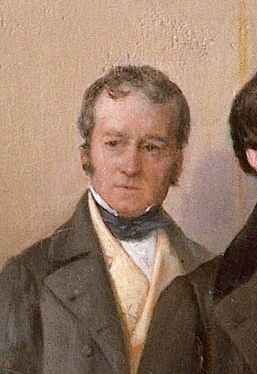
- Portrait by François Joseph Heim, 1847
- Born: François-Antoine-Eugène de Planard; 4 February 1783; Millau, France
- Died: 13 November 1853 (aged 70); Paris, France
- Occupation: Playwright

François-Antoine-Eugène de Planard (French: [fʁɑ̃swa ɑ̃twan øʒɛn də planaʁ]; 4 February 1783 – 13 November 1853), known as just Eugène de Planard, was a 19th-century French playwright.

He collaborated with Daniel-François-Esprit Auber, Ferdinand Hérold (Le pré aux clercs, 1832), Adolphe Adam (Le farfadet, 1852), Nicolas-Charles Bochsa, Michele Enrico Carafa, Jacques-Fromental Halévy (L'Éclair, 1835), George Onslow et Ambroise Thomas (Le caïd, 1849; Le carnaval de Venise, 1852).

His daughter Eugénie (1818–1874) married the dramatist and librettist Adolphe de Leuven (1802–1884).

== Works (selection) ==
- 1832: Le pré aux clercs, opéra comique in three acts after Prosper Mérimée, music by Ferdinand Hérold, Opéra-Comique (15 December)
- 1835: L'Éclair, opéra-comique in three acts with Jules-Henri Vernoy de Saint-Georges, music by Jacques-Fromental Halévy, Opéra-Comique (16 December)
- 1837: La double échelle, opéra comique in one act, music by Ambroise Thomas, Opéra-Comique (23 August)
- 1837: Guise ou les états de Blois with Saint-Georges, music by George Onslow, Opéra-Comique (8 September)
- 1838: Le perruquier de la Régence, opéra comique in three acts with Paul Duport, music by Ambroise Thomas, Opéra-Comique (30 March)
- 1852: Le farfadet, opéra comique, music by Adolphe Adam, Opéra-Comique (19 March)

=== Bibliography ===
- Christian Goubault (2003). "François-Antoine-Eugène de Planard". In Joël-Marie Fauquet (ed.). Dictionnaire de la musique en France au XIXe siècle (in French). Paris: Fayard. ISBN 2-213-59316-7.
