= Euphrasie Borghèse =

French soprano

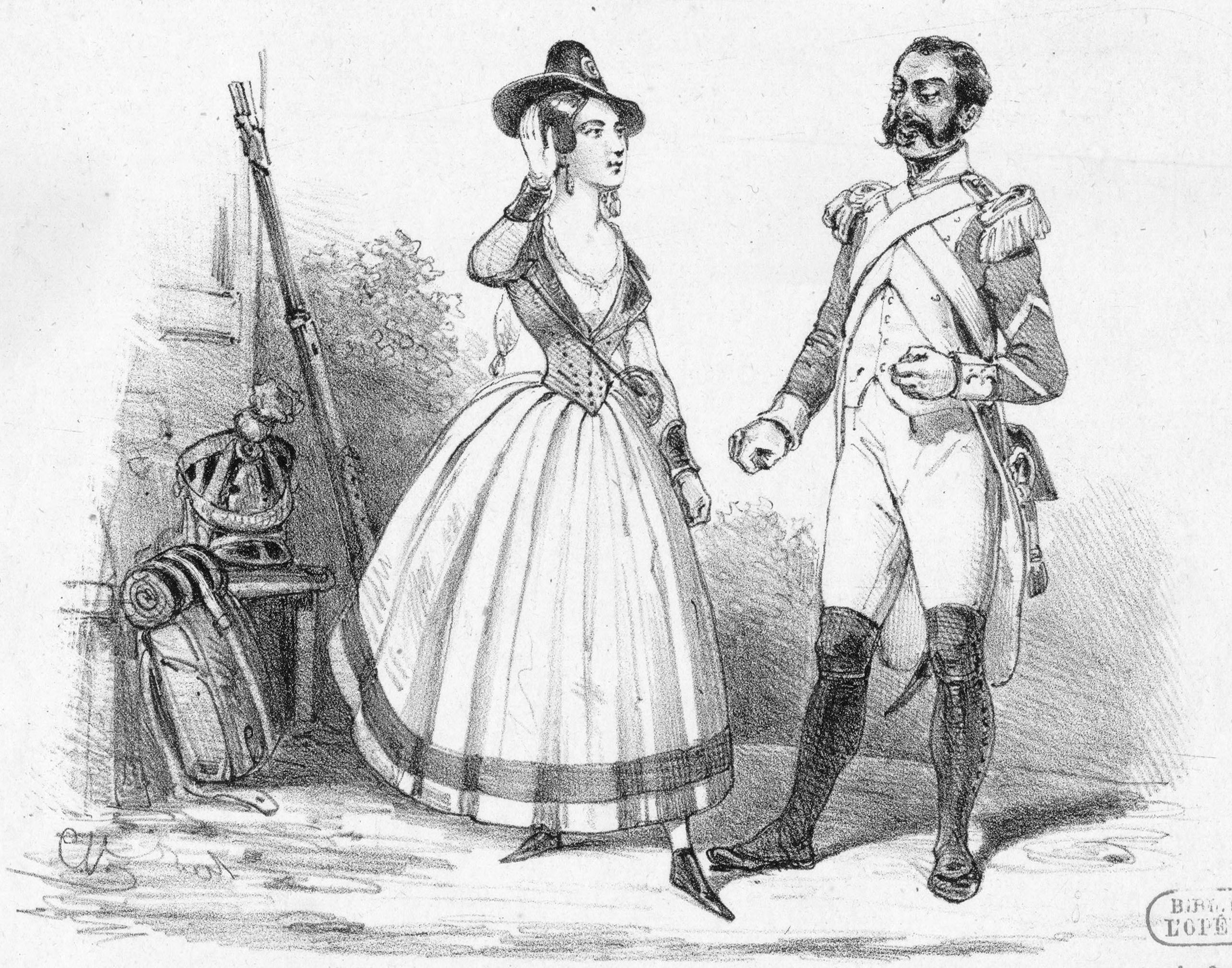
Borghèse as Marie and François-Louis Henry as Sulpice in the premiere of La fille du régiment

Euphrasie Borghèse (born Juliette Euphrosine Bourgeois; 1818), was a French operatic soprano who is best known for creating the role of Marie in Donizetti's La fille du régiment.

Born in Paris with the family name Bourgeois, Borghèse was a private voice student of Nicolas Levasseur and also studied with Ferdinando Paer. She traveled to Italy, where she began appearing under the name Eufrasia Borghese.

Returning to France she joined the roster of the Opéra-Comique as Euphrasie Borghèse, where she bowed in 1840 as Marie in the world premiere of La fille du régiment. Soon thereafter she left the company and began a tour of North America, where she would spend the bulk of her career appearing under the name Eufrasia Borghese. 1844 found her in New York joining a troupe playing Italian opera; the following year she took directorship of the company in New Orleans. In 1846 and 1847 she was appearing in Vienna, and in 1848 she performed in Madrid. 1849 saw her return to North America on tour; in New York in 1851, she married Maximilien Hardtmuth of Vienna. In 1854 she returned once more to Paris, where she continued to perform concerts.

A silhouette portrait of Borghèse cut by Auguste Edouart in 1841 is currently owned by the National Portrait Gallery of the Smithsonian Institution in the United States.
