= Nino Machaidze =

Georgian operatic soprano

- ნინო მაჩაიძე
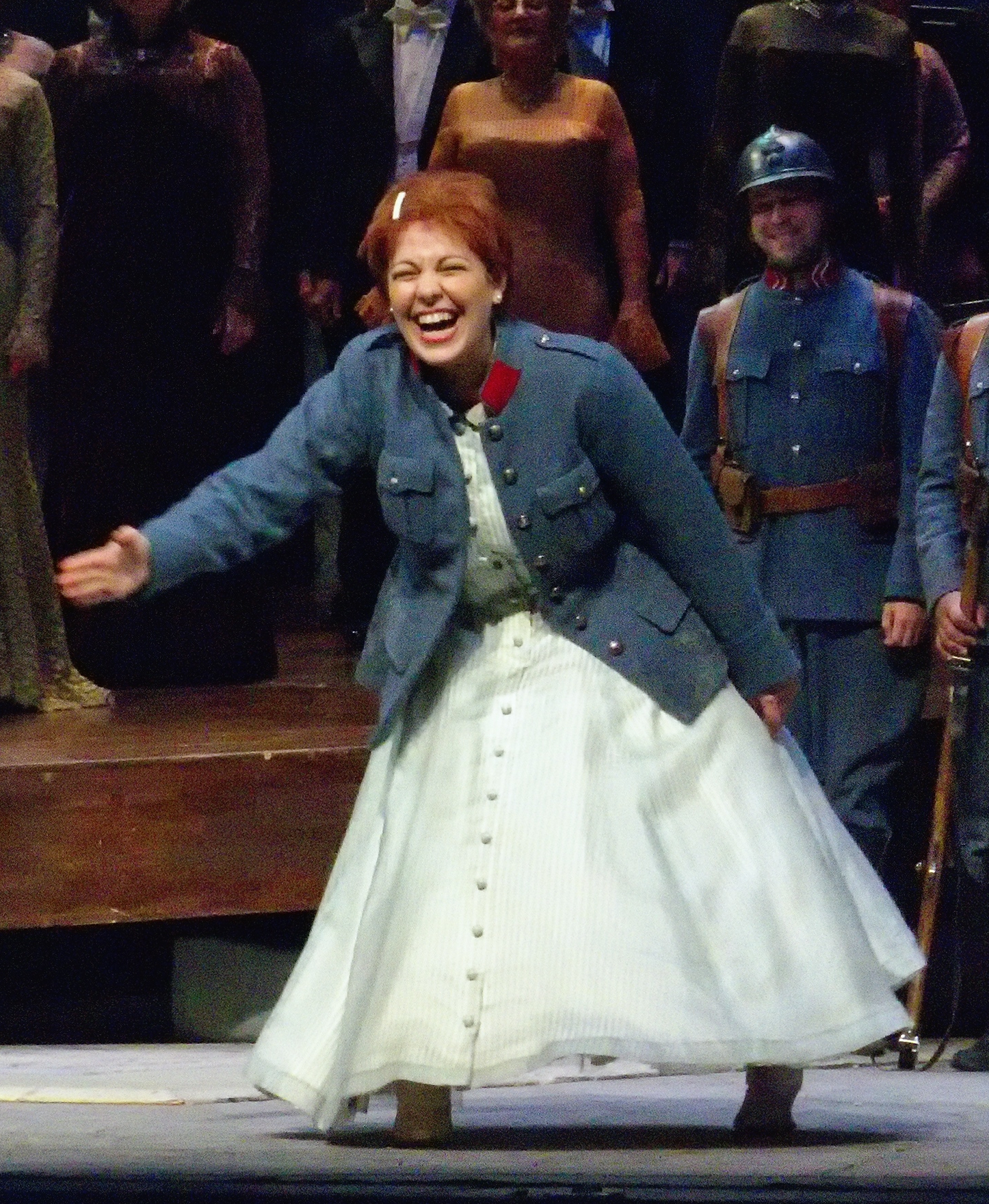
- Machaidze at the curtain call of La fille du régiment, Metropolitan Opera, 24 December 2011
- Born: 8 March 1983 (age 43); Tbilisi, Georgian SSR
- Occupation: Operatic soprano
- Years active: 2007–present
- Spouse: Guido Loconsolo (m. 2011)
- Website: Nino Machaidze on Facebook

Nino Machaidze (Georgian: ნინო მაჩაიძე; born 8 March 1983) is a Georgian operatic soprano. She performs in 19th-century Romantic repertoire, primarily in operas by Rossini and Verdi as well as French operas. Beginning her career at La Scala, she gained international attention after being cast as Juliette in Gounod's Roméo et Juliette at the 2008 Salzburg Festival, after which she earned the nickname "Angelina Jolie of Opera" from the Austrian press.

== Early life ==
Nino Machaidze was born to a Georgian language teacher mother and an economist father and raised in Tbilisi. At the age of six she began piano and vocal lessons at a school affiliated with the Tbilisi State Conservatoire, which she later also attended. At 17, she also attended flute lessons, hoping to strengthen the diaphragm. Between 2000 and 2005, she had role engagements as Zerlina in Don Giovanni, Gilda in Rigoletto, Rosina in The Barber of Seville, and Norina in Don Pasquale at the Georgian National Opera Theater.

In 2005, she was among the 9 applicants accepted into the Accademia del Teatro alla Scala after an intense competition. At the academy, she studied with Luciana Serra, Leyla Gencer, and Luigi Alva and also attended masterclasses of Renato Bruson and Mirella Freni. In 2006 she debuted at the theater as Najade in Ariadne auf Naxos and won first prize in the Leyla Gencer Voice Competition in Istanbul.

== Career ==
=== Early career (2007–2013) ===
Machaidze proceeded to perform several roles in sequential seasons at La Scala: Silvia in Ascanio in Alba, Marie in La fille du régiment, Despina in Così fan tutte, Lauretta in Gianni Schicchi, and Musetta in La bohème. She returned in 2010 for L'elisir d'amore and 2011 for Roméo et Juliette. She also made guest appearances at the Teatro dell'Opera di Roma (Marie), the Teatro Carlo Felice (Amina in La sonnambula), and the Teatro Regio di Parma (Gilda in Rigoletto).

Spotted by artistic director Jürgen Flimm as Lauretta led her to play Juliette in the new Salzburg Festival production of Gounod's Roméo et Juliette in 2008 opposite Rolando Villazón when Anna Netrebko dropped out due to pregnancy. The performance turned out to be successful, therefore propelled her to international fame. She then sang the role at the Concertgebouw. She would return to Salzburg in 2010 for the same opera, sharing Juliette with Netrebko, and in 2012 for La bohème (Musetta) with Netrebko as Mimì. In 2009, she was cast as Elvira in I puritani opposite Juan Diego Flórez at the Teatro Comunale di Bologna, before repeating Juliette at La Fenice. She sang Lucia in Lucia di Lammermoor first at La Monnaie, and later in Salerno and Valencia.

Machaidze was cast as Donna Fiorilla in a new production of Il turco in Italia at the Theater an der Wien in July 2009. Later in the year, she made her Los Angeles Opera debut with Adina (L'elisir d'amore), and subsequently made her Bavarian State Opera debut in the same role, premiering David Bösch's production. In 2010, she made her Liceu debut in La fille du régiment, and Royal Opera, London debut with Juliette. The year 2011 saw her Metropolitan Opera performances: Rigoletto in January and May, and La fille du régiment in December. She returned to Los Angeles for Fiorilla and, later in the year, for Juliette, which she also sang at the Verona Arena and BOZAR.

In September 2011, she made her Hamburg State Opera debut singing Gilda and Lucia. In 2012, she sang Gilda at the Paris Opera and Teatro Pérez Galdós in Las Palmas. In 2013, she returned to the Teatro Carlo Felice (Gilda) and Liceu (Fiorilla), and made her Teatro Real debut with L'elisir d'amore, in which she later made her Vienna State Opera debut in Otto Schenk's production. During the years, she added two French roles: Leïla in Les pêcheurs de perles (Teatro Filarmonico in Verona), a role she repeated at the Salle Pleyel in Paris, and the title role in Thaïs, alongside Plácido Domingo (Teatro de la Maestranza). They would unite in concert performances of the same opera at the Liceu in 2017.

=== Mid-career (2014–present) ===
Machaidze returned to the Los Angeles Opera for Thaïs in May 2014 and her first Violetta in La traviata, which opened the 2014/15 season. She would sing her first Mimì in La bohème in 2015/16 and Leïla in 2017/18. The season also saw her return to Hamburg for the premiere of Andreas Homoki's new Luisa Miller, her debut in the title role, and La traviata. The Luisa production would later revive in 2016 and 2018 with her. In 2015, she made several role debuts after singing Fiorilla in Turin: Contessa di Folleville in Il viaggio a Reims (Dutch National Opera), Micaëla in Carmen (La Scala), Ninetta in La gazza ladra (Rossini Opera Festival), and Inès in L'Africaine (Deutsche Oper Berlin), followed by Gilda in Toulouse.

She sang her first Desdemona in Rossini's Otello in February 2016 in Damiano Michieletto's new production at the Theater an der Wien. She returned to the Verona Arena for Violetta, before heading to the Royal Opera House Muscat for Roméo et Juliette with the Opéra de Monte-Carlo. She then made Teatro di San Carlo and the Grand Théâtre de Genève debuts respectively with Desdemona and Mimì. In 2017, after stepping in as Fiorilla at the Bergen National Opera, she repeated Folleville at the Royal Danish Theatre, and made her San Francisco Opera debut with her last Gilda. She returned to the Rossini Opera Festival for Pamira in Le siège de Corinthe. She made her first appearance in Korea in La traviata, and returned in the same season for Mimì at the Seoul Arts Center.

Machaidze added two new roles in 2018: Mathilde in William Tell (Teatro Massimo in Palermo), and Nedda in Pagliacci in Geneva. She made her Zürich Opera House debut with Luisa Miller, during which she briefly returned to Georgia to sing the national anthem "Tavisupleba" on the parade for the centenary of the Democratic Republic of Georgia. She returned to Naples for Violetta, and in the next season for her first Antonia in The Tales of Hoffmann. She sang at the Badisches Staatstheater Karlsruhe (Juliette, June 2018; Antonia, December 2019). Later in the year, she reprised Rosina in The Barber of Seville, in Verona and Amsterdam. In 2019, she was a guest performer at the Semperopernball. She debuted in the title role in Manon at the Théâtre des Champs-Élysées and Vienna State Opera. She was rejoined by Domingo in concert performances of Luisa Miller at the Salzburg Festival. Despite announcing withdrawal from La traviata in Paris claiming medical treatment, she stepped into Otello at the Oper Frankfurt, in the Michieletto production she premiered.

In 2020, she performed Mimì at the New National Theatre Tokyo.

== Personal life ==
Machaidze has been residing in Milan, Italy since 2005. She married baritone Guido Loconsolo on 26 September 2011. They have two children: Alessandro (born 9 August 2013), and Elena (born 18 January 2021). She enjoys swimming but not jogging. She is active on social media and has over 100,000 followers on Facebook.

== Awards ==
Machaidze was awarded the Best Female Opera Singer in the Premios Líricos Teatro Campoamor in Oviedo for the 2012/13 season, for her performances in Il turco in Italia (Liceu) and Thaïs (Teatro de la Maestranza).

== Opera roles ==
- Zerlina, Don Giovanni (Mozart)
- Norina, Don Pasquale (Donizetti)
- Rosina, Il barbiere di Siviglia (Rossini)
- Gilda, Rigoletto (Verdi)
- Naiad, Ariadne auf Naxos (Strauss)
- Silvia, Ascanio in Alba (Mozart)
- Marie, La fille du régiment (Donizetti)
- Despina, Così fan tutte (Mozart)
- Lauretta, Gianni Schicchi (Puccini)
- Amina, La sonnambula (Bellini)
- Musetta, La bohème (Puccini)
- Juliette, Roméo et Juliette (Gounod)
- Elvira, I puritani (Bellini)
- Lucia, Lucia di Lammermoor (Donizetti)
- Fiorilla, Il turco in Italia (Rossini)
- Adina, L'elisir d'amore (Donizetti)
- Olga Sukarev, Fedora (Giordano)
- Leïla, Les pêcheurs de perles (Bizet)
- Thaïs, Thaïs (Massenet)
- Violetta, La traviata (Verdi)
- Luisa, Luisa Miller (Verdi)
- Folleville, Il viaggio a Reims (Rossini)
- Micaëla, Carmen (Bizet)
- Ninetta, La gazza ladra (Rossini)
- Inès, L'Africaine (Meyerbeer)
- Desdemona, Otello (Rossini)
- Mimì, La bohème (Puccini)
- Pamira, Le siège de Corinthe (Rossini)
- Mathilde, Guillaume Tell (Rossini)
- Nedda, Pagliacci (Leoncavallo)
- Antonia, Les contes d'Hoffmann (Offenbach)
- Manon, Manon (Massenet)
- Giselda, I Lombardi alla prima crociata (Verdi)
- Daria, Viva la Mamma (Donizetti)
- Armida, Armida (Rossini)

== Recordings ==
Machaidze has been a Sony artist since January 2011.

=== CDs ===
- Giordano: Fedora (as Olga Sukarev; 2010). Angela Gheorghiu, Plácido Domingo. La Monnaie Orchestra and Chorus, Alberto Veronesi (Deutsche Grammophon)
- Romantic Arias – Rossini, Donizetti, Massenet, Bellini, Gounod (2011). Teatro Comunale di Bologna Orchestra, Michele Mariotti (Sony)
- Arias & Scenes (2013). Orchestre National de France, Daniele Gatti (Sony)

=== DVDs ===
- Puccini: Il trittico (as Lauretta; 2008). Riccardo Chailly, La Scala (Hardy Classic)
- Gounod: Roméo et Juliette (as Juliette; 2008). Rolando Villazón. Yannick Nézet-Séguin, Salzburg Festival (Deutsche Grammophon)
- Verdi: Rigoletto (as Gilda; 2008). Leo Nucci. Massimo Zanetti, Teatro Regio di Parma (Unitel Classica)
- Bellini: I puritani (as Elvira; 2009). Juan Diego Flórez. Michele Mariotti, Teatro Comunale di Bologna (Decca)
- Gounod: Roméo et Juliette (as Juliette; 2011). Stefano Secco. Fabio Mastrangelo, Arena di Verona (BelAir Classiques)
- Puccini: La bohème (as Musetta; 2012). Anna Netrebko. Daniele Gatti, Salzburg Festival (Deutsche Grammophon; Unitel Classica)
