= L'Éclair =

Opéra comique in 3 acts by Fromental Halévy

- Opéra comique by Fromental Halévy
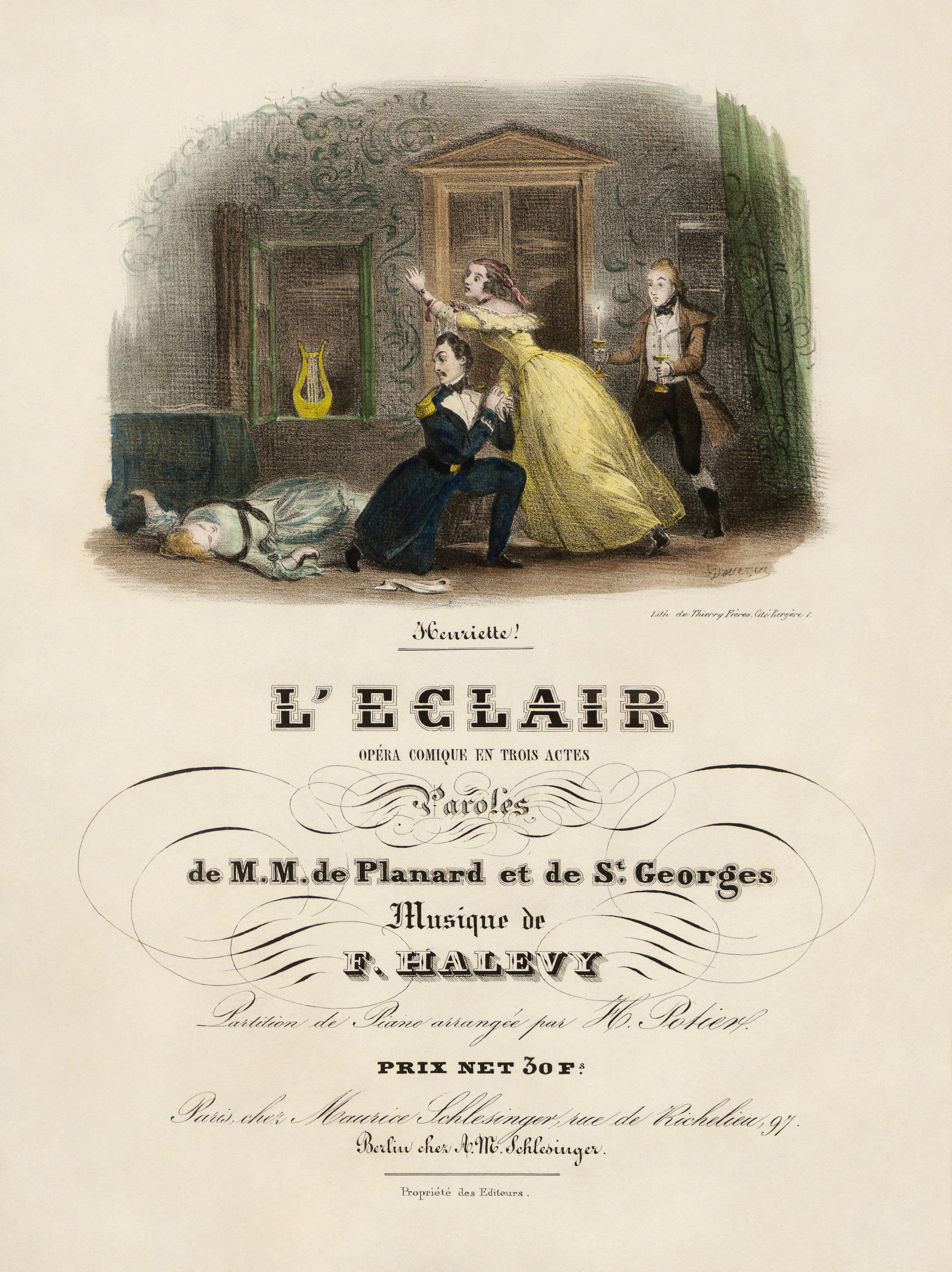
- Title page of an early vocal score of the opera
- Librettist: Jules-Henri Vernoy de Saint-Georges
- Premiere: 16 December 1835; Théâtre de l'Opéra-Comique-Bourse, Paris

L'Éclair (The Lightning Flash) is an opéra comique in 3 acts by Fromental Halévy to a libretto by Jules-Henri Vernoy de Saint-Georges.

L'Éclair was premiered by the Paris Opéra-Comique at the Salle de la Bourse on 16 December 1835; Jacques Offenbach was a cellist in the orchestra. The opera was well received which placed Halévy in the unusual position of having two simultaneous successes on the Paris stage (the other being his grand opera masterpiece, La Juive).

It was first performed in the United States on 16 February 1837 at the Théâtre d'Orléans in New Orleans. It remained popular in the 19th century (Emma Calvé sang in it in 1885) and has been revived in modern times. Some of its arias (including the tenor aria 'Quand de la nuit') have been recorded.

== Roles ==
| Role | Voice type | Premiere Cast, 16 December 1835 (Conductor: Henri Valentino) |
|---|---|---|
| George | tenor | Joseph-Antoine-Charles Couderc |
| Henriette | soprano | Amélie Miro-Camoin |
| Lyonel | tenor | Jean-Baptiste Chollet |
| Madame Darbel | soprano | Félicité Pradher, née More |

== Synopsis ==
Place: Contemporary Boston
Time:

It recounts the amours of the Englishman George and the American Lyonel for two sisters, Henriette and the widow Mme. Darbel. These are complicated by everyone being a bit indecisive and variable in their choice of preferred partner, and then further complicated by the temporary blindness suffered by Lyonel when he is struck by lightning in a thunderstorm.
