= Jules-Henri Vernoy de Saint-Georges =

French playwright (1799–1875)

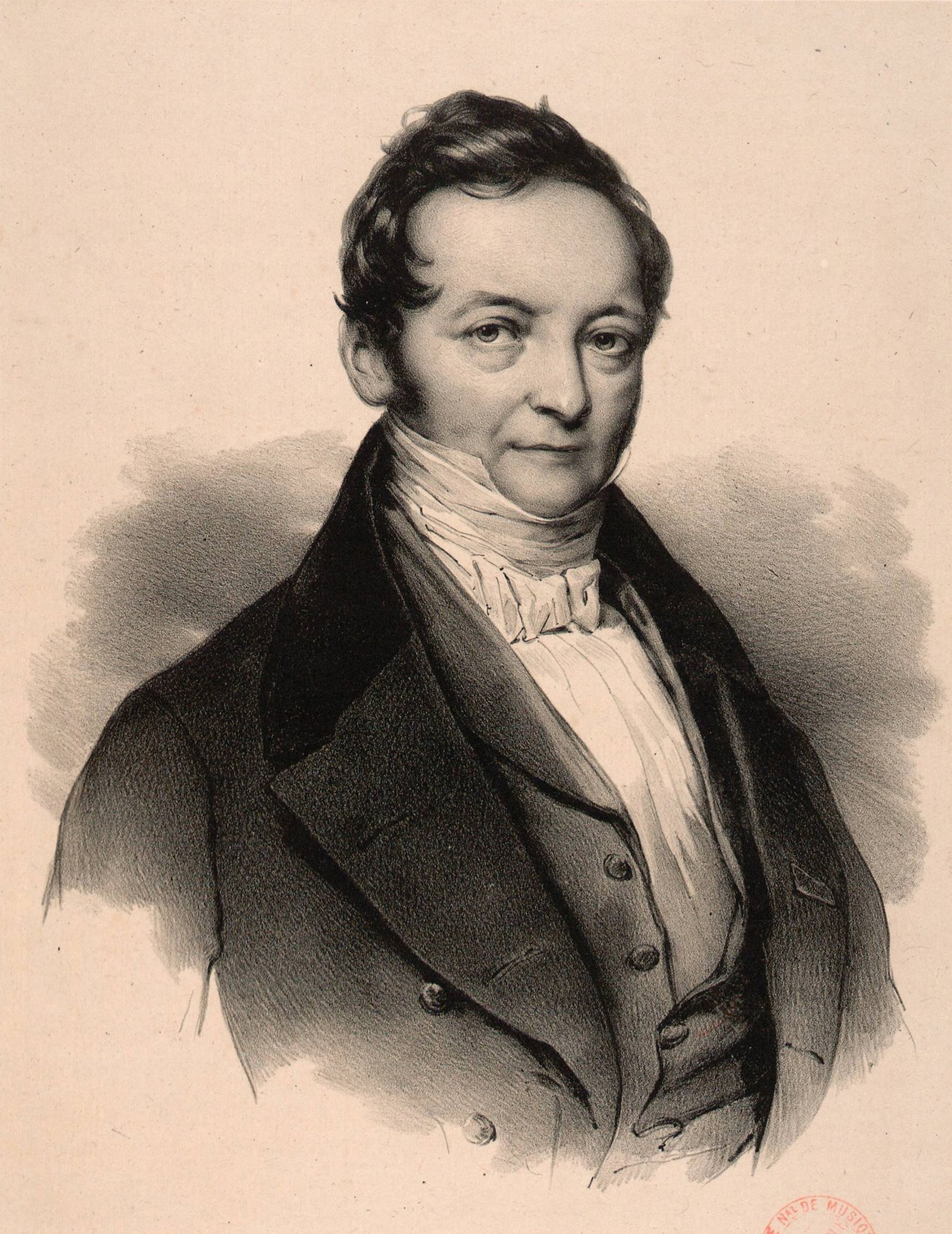
- Born: 7 November 1799; Paris, France
- Died: 23 December 1875 (aged 76); Paris, France
- Writing career
- Language: French

Jules-Henri Vernoy de Saint-Georges (French pronunciation: [ʒyl ɑ̃ʁi vɛʁnwa də sɛ̃ ʒɔʁʒ]; 7 November 1799 – 23 December 1875) was a French playwright, who was born and died in Paris. He was one of the most prolific librettists of the 19th century, often working in collaboration with others.

Saint-Georges' first work, Saint-Louis ou les deux dîners (1823), a comédie en vaudeville written in collaboration with Alexandre Tardif, was followed by a series of operas and ballets. In 1829 he became manager of the Opéra-Comique at Paris.

Among Saint-Georges' more famous libretti are: the ballet Giselle (with Théophile Gautier) (1841), the opera L'éclair (1835) for Halévy, the opera La fille du régiment (with Jean-François Bayard) (1840) for Donizetti, and the opera La jolie fille de Perth for Georges Bizet. Virtually all his opera libretti are for opéras comiques, although La reine de Chypre (1841), for Halévy, was a grand opera.

In all Saint-Georges wrote over seventy stage pieces in collaboration with Eugène Scribe and other authors. He also wrote novels, including Un Mariage de prince.

Saint-Georges was notably old-fashioned in his approach, typically depending on highly improbable coincidences and twists with little attempt at convincing characterisation. His tastes were reflected in his personal affectation of 18th-century costume and manners in his everyday life.

== Works ==
=== Librettos ===
- Le Bourgeois de Reims, one-act opéra comique, with Constant Ménissier, music by François-Joseph Fétis, Paris, Théâtre de l'Opéra-Comique, 7 June 1825
- Louis XII, ou la Route de Reims, three-act opéra comique, with Joseph-François-Stanislas Maizony de Lauréal, music by Wolfgang Amadeus Mozart, Théâtre de l'Odéon, 7 June 1825
- L'Artisan, one-act opéra comique, music by Jacques Fromental Halévy, Théâtre de l'Opéra-Comique, 30 January 1827
- Le Roi et le batelier, one-act opéra comique, music by Victor Rifaut and Jacques Fromental Halévy, Théâtre de l'Opéra-Comique, 3 November 1827
- Pierre et Catherine, one-act opéra-comique, music by Adolphe Adam, Théâtre de l'Opéra-Comique, 18 July 1829
- Jenny, three-act opéra-comique, music by Michele Enrico Carafa, Théâtre de l'Opéra-Comique, 24 September 1829
- Ludovic, drame lyrique in 2 actes, music by Ferdinand Hérold and Jacques-Fromental Halévy, Théâtre de l'Opéra-Comique, 16 May 1833
- La Sentinelle perdue, one-act opéra comique, music by Victor Rifaut, Théâtre de l'Opéra-Comique, 9 December 1834
- La Marquise, one-act opéra comique, with Adolphe de Leuven, music by Adolphe Adam, Théâtre de l'Opéra-Comique, 28 February 1835
- L'Éclair, three-act opéra comique, with Eugène de Planard, music by Jacques-Fromental Halévy, Théâtre de l'Opéra-Comique, 16 December 1835
- Le Luthier de Vienne, one-act opéra comique, with Adolphe de Leuven, music by Hippolyte Monpou, Théâtre de l'Opéra-Comique, 30 June 1836
- L'Ambassadrice, three-act opéra comique, by Eugène Scribe, music by Daniel-François-Esprit Auber, Théâtre de l'Opéra-Comique, 21 December 1836
- Guise, ou les États de Blois, drame lyrique in 3 acts, with Eugène de Planard, music by George Onslow, Théâtre de l'Opéra-Comique, 8 September 1837
- Le Fidèle berger, three-act opéra comique, with Eugène Scribe, music by Adolphe Adam, Théâtre de l'Opéra-Comique, 6 January 1838
- La Gipsy, ballet-pantomime in 3 acts and 5 tableaux, with Joseph Mazilier, music by François Benoist, Ambroise Thomas, and Marco Aurelio Marliani, Théâtre de l'Opéra, 28 January 1839
- Le Planteur, two-act opéra comique, music by Hippolyte Monpou, Théâtre de l'Opéra-Comique, 1 March 1839
- La Reine d'un jour, three-act opéra comique, with Eugène Scribe, music by Adolphe Adam, Théâtre de l'Opéra-Comique, 19 September 1839
- La Filleule des fées, ballet-féerie in 3 acts and 7 tableaux with prologue and apotheosis, with Jules Perrot, music by Adolphe Adam, Théâtre de l'Opéra, 8 October 1849.
- La Symphonie, ou Maître Albert, one-act opéra comique, music by Louis Clapisson, Théâtre de l'Opéra-Comique, 12 October 1839
- La Fille du régiment, two-act opéra comique, with Jean-François Bayard, music by Gaetano Donizetti, Théâtre de l'Opéra-Comique, 11 February 1840
- Zanetta, ou Il ne faut pas jouer avec le feu, three-act opéra comique, with Eugène Scribe, music by Daniel-François-Esprit Auber, Théâtre de l'Opéra-Comique, 18 May 1840
- L'Opéra à la cour, opéra comique in 4 parts, with Eugène Scribe, music arranged by Albert Grisar and François Adrien Boieldieu, Théâtre de l'Opéra-Comique, 16 July 1840
- Le Diable amoureux, ballet-pantomime in 3 acts and 8 tableaux, with Joseph Mazilier, music by François Benoist and Henri Reber, Académie royale de musique, 21 September 1840
- Les Diamants de la couronne, three-act opéra comique, with Eugène Scribe, music by Daniel-François-Esprit Auber, Théâtre de l'Opéra-Comique, 6 March 1841
- Giselle, ou les Wilis, ballet fantastique in 2 acts, with Théophile Gautier and Jean Coralli, music by Adolphe Adam, Académie royale de musique, 28 June 1841
- L'Aïeule, one-act opéra comique, music by François Adrien Boieldieu, Théâtre de l'Opéra-Comique, 17 August 1841
- La Reine de Chypre, five-act opera, music by Jacques-Fromental Halévy, Académie royale de musique, 22 December 1841
- La Jolie Fille de Gand, ballet-pantomime in three acts and nine tableaux, music by Adolphe Adam, Académie royale de musique, 22 June 1842
- L'Esclave du Camoëns, one-act opéra-comique, music by Friedrich von Flotow, Théâtre de l'Opéra-Comique, 1 December 1843
- Cagliostro, three-act opéra comique, with Eugène Scribe, music by Adolphe Adam, Théâtre de l'Opéra-Comique, 10 February 1844
- Lady Henriette, ou la Servante de Greenwich, ballet-pantomime in 3 acts and 9 tableaux, with Joseph Mazilier, music by Friedrich von Flotow, Friedrich Burgmüller and Ernest Deldevèze, Paris, Académie royale de musique, 22 February 1844
- Le Lazzarone, ou Le bien vient en dormant, opera in 2 acts, music by Jacques Fromental Halévy, Académie royale de musique, 29 March 1844
- Wallace, three-act opéra comique, music by Charles Simon Catel, Théâtre de l'Opéra-Comique, 4 December 1844
- Les Mousquetaires de la Reine, three-act opéra comique, music by Jacques Fromental Halévy, Théâtre de l'Opéra-Comique, 3 February 1846
- L'Âme en peine, opéra-ballet fantastique in 2 acts, music by Friedrich von Flotow, Théâtre de l'Opéra, 29 June 1846
- Le Val d'Andorre, three-act opéra comique, music by Jacques-Fromental Halévy, Théâtre de l'Opéra-Comique, 11 November 1848
- La Fée aux roses, opéra comique, three-act féerie, with Eugène Scribe, music by Jacques-Fromental Halévy, Théâtre de l'Opéra-Comique, 1 October 1849
- Le Fanal, two-act opera, music by Adolphe Adam, Théâtre de l'Opéra, 24 December 1849
- La Serafina, ou l'Occasion fait le larron, one-act opéra comique, with Henri Dupin, music by M. de Saint-Julien, Théâtre de l'Opéra-Comique, 16 August 1851
- Le Château de la Barbe-bleue, three-act opéra comique, music by Armand Limnander, Théâtre de l'Opéra-Comique, 1 December 1851
- La Fille de Pharaon, grand ballet in three acts and eight tableaux with prologue and epilogue, St-Petersburg, Grand théâtre Impérial, 18 January 1852
- Le Carillonneur de Bruges, three-act opéra comique, music by Albert Grisar, Théâtre de l'Opéra-Comique, 20 February 1852
- Le Juif errant, five-act opera, with Eugène Scribe, music by Jacques Fromental Halévy, Théâtre de l'Opéra, 23 April 1852
- Les Amours du diable, opéra-féerie in 4 acts, 9 tableaux, music by Albert Grisar, Théâtre-Lyrique, 13 March 1853
- Le Nabab, three-act opéra comique, with Eugène Scribe, music by Jacques-Fromental Halévy, Théâtre de l'Opéra-Comique, 1 September 1853
- Jaguarita l'indienne, three-act opéra comique, with Adolphe de Leuven, music by Jacques Fromental Halévy, Théâtre-Lyrique, 14 May 1855
- Falstaff, one-act opéra-comique, with Adolphe de Leuven, after William Shakespeare's The Merry Wives of Windsor, music by Adolphe Adam, 18 January 1856
- Le Corsaire, ballet-pantomime in 3 acts, after Lord Byron, with Joseph Mazilier, music by Adolphe Adam, Théâtre de l'Opéra, 23 January 1856
- La Fanchonnette, three-act opéra comique, with Adolphe de Leuven, music by Louis Clapisson, Théâtre-Lyrique, 1 March 1856
- Les Elfes, ballet fantastique in 3 acts, with Joseph Mazilier, music by Nicolò Gabrielli, Théâtre de l'Opéra, 11 August 1856
- La Rose de Florence, two-act opera, music by Emanuele Biletta, Théâtre de l'Académie impériale de musique, 10 November 1856
- Le Sylphe, two-act opéra comique, music by Louis Clapisson, Théâtre de l'Opéra-Comique, 27 November 1856
- Euryanthe, three-act opera, libretto by Helmina von Chézy, translation by Henri de Saint-Georges and Adolphe de Leuven, music by Carl Maria von Weber, Théâtre-Lyrique, 1 September 1857
- Margot, three-act opéra comique, with Adolphe de Leuven, music by Louis Clapisson, Théâtre-Lyrique, 5 November 1857
- La Magicienne, five-act opera, music by Jacques Fromental Halévy, Théâtre de l'Opéra, 17 March 1858
- La Pagode, two-act opéra comique, music by Antoine-François Fauconnier, Théâtre de l'Opéra-Comique, 20 September 1859
- Pierre de Médicis, opera in 4 acts and 7 tableaux, with Émilien Pacini, music by Joseph Poniatowski, Académie impériale de musique, 9 March 1860
- Le papillon, ballet-pantomime in 2 acts and 4 tableaux, with Marie Taglioni, music by Jacques Offenbach, Théâtre de l'Opéra, 26 November 1860
- Maître Claude, one-act opéra comique, with Adolphe de Leuven, music by Jules Cohen, Théâtre de l'Opéra-Comique, 19 March 1861
- Au travers du mur, one-act opéra comique, music by Józef Poniatowski, Théâtre-Lyrique, 9 May 1861
- Le Joaillier de Saint-James, three-act opéra comique, with Adolphe de Leuven, music by Albert Grisar, Théâtre de l'Opéra-Comique, 17 February 1862
- La Fiancée du roi de Garbe, opéra comique in 3 acts and 6 tableaux, with Eugène Scribe, music by Daniel-François-Esprit Auber, Théâtre de l'Opéra-Comique, 11 January 1864
- La Maschera, ou les Nuits de Venise, ballet-pantomime in 3 acts and 6 tableaux, with Giuseppe Rota, music by Paolo Giorza, Théâtre de l'Opéra, 19 February 1864
- L'Aventurier, four-act opéra comique, music by Joseph Poniatowski, Théâtre-Lyrique, 26 January 1865
- Martha, opera in 4 acts and 6 tableaux, music by Friedrich von Flotow, Théâtre-Lyrique, 15 December 1865
- Zilda, conte des mille et une nuits, two-act opéra comique, with Henri Chivot, music by Friedrich von Flotow, Théâtre de l'Opéra-Comique, 28 May 1866
- La Jolie fille de Perth, opera in 4 acts and 5 tableaux, with Jules Adenis, music by Georges Bizet, Théâtre-Lyrique, 29 December 1867
- L'Ombre, three-act opéra comique, music by Friedrich von Flotow, Théâtre de l'Opéra-Comique, 7 July 1870
- Le Florentin, three-act opéra comique, music by Charles Lenepveu, Théâtre de l'Opéra-Comique, 25 February 1874
- Alma l'enchanteresse, four-act opera, adapted to the Italian stage by Achille de Lauzières, music by Friedrich von Flotow, Théâtre des Italiens, 9 April 1878

=== Theatre ===
- L'Écarté, ou Un coin du salon, tableau-vaudeville in 1 act, with Eugène Scribe and Mélesville, Théâtre du Gymnase, 14 November 1822
- La Saint-Louis, ou les Deux dîners, vaudeville in 1 act, with Alexandre Tardif, Théâtre de Versailles, 25 August 1823
- L'Amour et l'appétit, one-act comédie en vaudeville, with Frédéric de Courcy and Saint-Elme, Théâtre de la Porte-Saint-Martin, 14 October 1823
- Monsieur Antoine, ou le N ̊ 2782, vaudeville in 1 act, with Francis baron d'Allarde and X. B. Saintine, Théâtre du Vaudeville, 17 May 1824
- Une journée aux Champs-Élysées, one-act tableau mingled with vaudevilles, with Constant Ménissier and Léon Rabbe, Théâtre de la Gaîté, 3 November 1824
- Les Recruteurs, ou la Fille du fermier, two-act play, extravaganza, with Antonio Franconi and Pierre Carmouche, Cirque-Olympique, 13 April 1825
- Belphégor, ou le Bonnet du diable, one-act vaudeville-féerie, with Achille d'Artois and Jules Vernet, Théâtre du Vaudeville, 26 April 1825
- Le Petit monstre et l'escamoteur, one-act folie-parade, with Antoine Jean-Baptiste Simonnin, Théâtre de la Gaîté, 7 July 1826
- La Robe et l'uniforme, comedy in 1 act mingled with couplets, with Pierre Carmouche, Théâtre de l'Ambigu-Comique, 20 September 1826
- Le Créancier voyageur, one-act comédie en vaudeville, with Martin Saint-Ange, Théâtre de la Porte-Saint-Martin, 30 September 1826
- 1750 et 1827, vaudeville in 2 tableaux, with Émile Balisson de Rougemont and Antoine Jean-Baptiste Simonnin, Théâtre du Vaudeville, 13 September 1827
- Le Grand Dîner, one-act tableau-vaudeville, by Antoine Jean-Baptiste Simonnin, Théâtre du Vaudeville, 25 February 1828
- Le Concert à la campagne, one-act intermède, with Léon Halévy, Théâtre de l'Odéon, 26 October 1828
- Le Prêteur sur gages, three-act drama, with Antony Béraud, Théâtre de la Gaîté, 18 July 1829
- Folbert, ou le Marie de la cantatrice, one-act comedy, mingled with couplets, with Léon Halévy, Théâtre des Variétés, 7 February 1832
- La Prima donna, ou la Sœur de lait, comedy mingled with song, with Achille d'Artois, Théâtre des Variétés, 26 November 1832
- Tigresse Mort-aux-rats, ou Poison et contre poison, medicine in 4 doses and in verse, with Henri Dupin, Théâtre des Variétés, 22 February 1833
- Le Bal des Variétés, two-act folie-vaudeville, with Adolphe de Leuven, Théâtre des Variétés, 28 January 1835
- Farinelli, ou le Bouffe du Roi, three-act historical comedy, with Auguste Pittaud de Forges, Théâtre du Palais-Royal, 17 February 1835
- L'Aumônier du régiment, one-act comedy mingled with couplets, with Adolphe de Leuven, Théâtre du Palais-Royal, 1 October 1835
- Léona, ou le Parisien en Corse, two-act comedy mingled with song, with Adolphe de Leuven, Théâtre du Palais-Royal, 14 January 1836
- Laurette, ou le Cachet rouge, one-act comédie en vaudeville, with Adolphe de Leuven, Théâtre du Vaudeville, 28 January 1836
- Le Jeune Père, one-act comédie en vaudeville, with Achille d'Artois, Théâtre des Variétés, 30 July 1836
- Riquiqui, three-act comedy, mingled with song, with Adolphe de Leuven, Théâtre du Palais-Royal, 11 March 1837
- La Maîtresse de langues, one-act comedy, mingled with song, with Adolphe de Leuven and Dumanoir, Théâtre du Palais-Royal, 21 February 1838
- La Suisse à Trianon, one-act comedy, mingled with songs, with Adolphe de Leuven and Louis-Émile Vanderburch, Théâtre des Variétés, 9 March 1838
- Lady Melvil, ou le Joaillier de Saint-James, three-act comedy, mingled with song, with Adolphe de Leuven, music by Albert Grisar, Théâtre de la Renaissance, 5 November 1838
- Dagobert, ou la Culotte à l'envers, drame historique et drôlatique, in 3 acts and in verse, preceded by a prologue in verse, with Adolphe de Leuven and Paulin Deslandes, Théâtre du Palais-Royal, 24 January 1839
- Mademoiselle Nichon, one-act comédie en vaudeville, with Adolphe de Leuven, Théâtre des Variétés, 28 January 1839
- Mademoiselle de Choisy, two-act comédie en vaudeville, with Bernard Lopez, Théâtre des Variétés, 3 April 1848
- L'Espion du grand monde, five-act drama, with Théodore Anne, Théâtre de l'Ambigu-Comique, 22 February 1856
- Une conférence, saynète in verse, Théâtre de Madame la Duchesse de Riario-Sforza, 21 February 1867
- Mademoiselle la Marquise, five-act comedy, in prose, preceded by a prologue, with Lockroy, Théâtre de l'Odéon, 12 February 1869

=== Novels ===
- Les Nuits terribles (1821)
- L'Espion du grand monde (7 tomes en 3 volumes, 1850)
- Un mariage de prince. Le Livre d'heures. L'Auto-da-fé (2 volumes, 1852)
- Les Princes de Maquenoise (12 volumes, 1860)
- Les Yeux verts, histoire fantastique (1872)

== Sources ==
- Grove's Dictionary of Music and Musicians, Saint-Georges, Jules-Henri Vernoy de.
