= Albert Grisar =

Belgian composer (1808–1869)

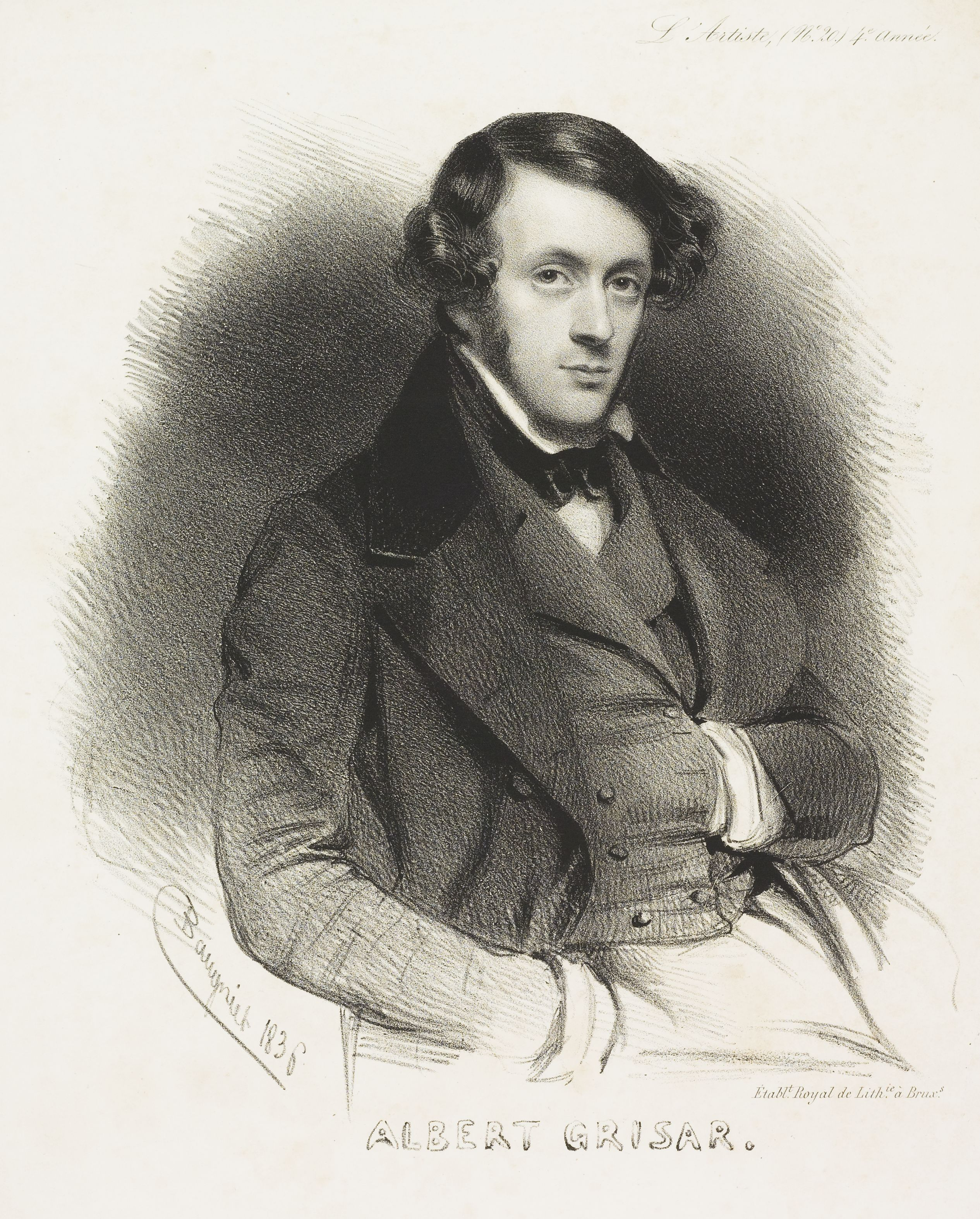
Albert Grisar

Albert Grisar (25 December 1808 – 15 June 1869) was a Belgian composer, mainly active in Paris.

== Career ==
Born in Antwerp, Grisar's family had intended for him to pursue a tradesman's career, but he defied their wishes to devote himself to music. He studied in Antwerp with Joseph Janssens, in Paris under Anton Reicha, and in the mid-1840s in Naples with Saverio Mercadante. Grisar was a successful comic opera composer, first winning success in Brussels in 1833 and in Paris later in the decade. He collaborated with Flotow on L'Eau merveilleuse (1839), with Flotow and Auguste Pilati in Le Naufrage de la Méduse (1839), and with François-Adrien Boieldieu on L'Opéra à la cour (1840). When he received a grant from the Belgian government in 1840 to study music of Belgian composers in Italy, he instead used his time in Rome and Naples to study compositional techniques of the comic opera. His Parisian works of the late 1840s and early 1850s were particularly well received by audiences.

He died in Asnières near Paris.

== Honours ==
- Knight of the Order of Leopold.

== Operas ==
- Le Mariage impossible, premiere: Théâtre de la Monnaie, Brussels 1833
- Sarah, ou L'Orpheline de Glencoé, premiere: Opéra-Comique, Paris 1836
- L'An mil, premiere: Opéra-Comique, Paris 1837
- Lady Melvil / Le Joallier de Saint-James, premiere: Théâtre de la Renaissance, Paris 1838
- La Suisse à Trianon, Paris 1838
- L'Eau merveilleuse, premiere: Théâtre de la Renaissance, Paris 1839
- Le Naufrage de la Méduse, premiere: Théâtre de la Renaissance, Paris, 31 May 1839
- Les Travestissements, Paris 1839
- Gille ravisseur, premiere: Opéra-Comique, Paris 1848
- Les Porcherons, premiere: Opéra-Comique, Paris 1850
- Bonsoir, monsieur Pantalon, premiere: Opéra-Comique, Paris 1851
- Le Carillonneur de Bruges, premiere: Opéra-Comique, Paris 1852
- Les Amours du diable (libretto by Jules-Henri Vernoy de Saint-Georges), premiere: Théâtre Lyrique, Paris 1853
- Le Chien du jardinier, premiere: Opéra-Comique, Paris 1855
- Voyage autour de ma chambre, Paris 1859
- La Chatte merveilleuse (libretto by Philippe Dumanoir and Adolphe d'Ennery), premiere: Théâtre Lyrique, Paris 1862
- Les Bégaiements d'amour, Paris 1864
- Les Douze Innocentes, Paris 1865
- Le Procès, 1867
