= La circassienne =

Opera by Daniel Auber

- Opéra comique by Daniel Auber
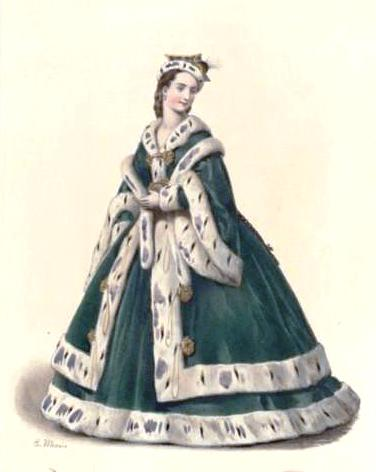
- Mademoiselle Monrose as Olga
- Librettist: Eugène Scribe
- Language: French
- Based on: Louvet de Couvrai's Une année de la vie du chevalier de Faublas
- Premiere: 2 February 1861; Salle Favart, Paris

La circassienne (The Circassian Woman) is an opera (opéra comique) in three acts composed by Daniel Auber to a French-language libretto by Eugène Scribe based on Louvet de Couvrai's 1787 novel Une année de la vie du chevalier de Faublas. It was premiered on 2 February 1861 by the Opéra-Comique at the second Salle Favart in Paris. Set in Russia during the Russian-Circassian War, the opera was also known under the titles Morte d'amour (Died of Love), La révolte au Sérail (The Revolt in the Seraglio), Alexis, and Faublas.

== Background and performance history ==
La circassienne was one of Auber's last operas, composed when he was nearly 80 years old. His librettist, Eugène Scribe, had been Auber's regular collaborator since 1823 and had written the libretto for his greatest success, Fra Diavolo. The opera was premiered by the Opéra-Comique in Paris on 2 February 1861 in a production directed by Ernest Mocker. In his review of the premiere for Le Ménestrel, Jacques Heugel praised the score as Auber's "most youthful, clever, and refined music", admirably adapted to Scribe's witty libretto and demonstrating once again that he was "the French musician par excellence". He went on to describe the opening night as "a true success" with the audience "in raptures". An English vocal score translated by Thomas Oliphant was published shortly after the premiere as were numerous parlour music versions and instrumental fantasies on the score by various composers, including Eugène Ketterer.

However, the opera's success proved to be short-lived. In October 1861 an adapted English version of La circassienne was given three performances by the Caroline Richings opera company in Philadelphia, but it received no performances in Europe outside France. It remained in the Opéra-Comique's repertoire for only one year with a total of 49 performances. In his reminiscences of an encounter with Auber shortly after the premiere, Richard Wagner described it as "an uncommonly childish piece of patchwork, scarcely credible as coming from its grey-haired author" and wrote that Auber refused to talk about it, telling him "Ah, let us leave the farces in peace!" The opera's overture was still occasionally played as a concert piece in the late 19th century and was recorded in the 1970s by Arthur Dennington conducting the Modern Symphony Orchestra (released on the Rare Recorded Editions label).

Scribe died two weeks after the premiere of La circassienne. His libretto was used again in 1871 as the basis for a German-language operetta by Franz von Suppé. Suppé's setting, entitled Fatinitza, achieved great success which led to litigation by Scribe's widow. Auber lived on for another ten years and composed three more operas, including Le premier jour de bonheur, his last major success.

== Roles ==
Roles, voice types, premiere cast
Role	Voice type	Premiere cast, 2 February 1861
Alexis Zouboff, a young Russian officer	tenor	Achille-Félix Montaubry
Orsakoff, a Russian general	baritone	Barielle
Olga, Orsakoff's niece and ward	soprano	Mlle Monrose
Lanskoi, an artist and Alexis's friend	tenor	Joseph-Antoine-Charles Couderc
Aboul Kasim, a Circassian sultan	bass	Eugène-Louis Troy
Soltikoff, a Russian captain	baritone	Charles-François Duvernoy
Perod, a Russian brigadier	baritone	Ambroise
Irak, a Circassian officer	bass	Davoust
Boudour, a eunuch in the service of Aboul Kasim	tenor	Paul-Pierre Laget
Zoloé, one of Aboul Kasim's wives	soprano	Mlle. Prost
Neïla, one of Aboul Kasim's wives	soprano	Mlle. Bousquet
Russian soldiers, Circassians, odalisques

== Synopsis ==
Setting: Circassia and Moscow in the early 1860s during the Russian-Circassian War

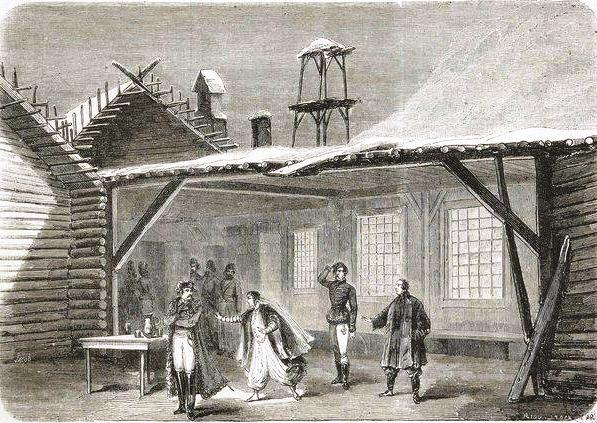
In a snowbound Russian fort, Alexis (dressed as Prascovia) addresses General Orsakoff. A Russian brigadier and Lanskoi look on.

=== Act 1 ===
In a Russian fort in Circassia in the dead of winter, Lieutenant Alexis Zouboff recounts an amusing story to his fellow officers. While on a sensitive errand, he had managed to gain entrance to a Russian countess's villa by disguising himself as a Circassian lady's maid named Prascovia. The disguise worked so well that the countess's brother-in-law, the boorish General Orsakoff, fell madly in love with "her" and Alexis was forced to disappear in order to escape his advances. As the soldiers discuss putting on a play to while away the time, Lanskoi, an artist and friend of Alexis, arrives at the fort with a copy of Dalayrac's comic opera Adolphe et Clara. It is decided that Alexis will play Clara and use the same costume he had worn as Prascovia.

As rehearsals are underway, General Orsakoff arrives at the fort with Olga, his niece and ward with whom Alexis had fallen in love when he was recuperating from battle wounds at her aunt's villa in the Crimea. The General is furious at the amateur theatricals and threatens to have the officers shot for abandoning their watch. However, when he sees Alexis in his costume, he thinks he has found his lost love, the beautiful Prascovia, and calms down. Olga observes that Prascovia bears a very striking resemblance to Alexis and to deflect suspicion, "Prascovia" tells Olga and Orsakoff that "she" is Alexis's sister. Orsakoff begs Olga to take on Prascovia as her companion, to which she agrees convinced that Prascovia is Alexis's sister. At this point there is a surprise attack by the Circassian army who kidnap Olga and Alexis (still dressed as Prascovia) and take them off to Sultan Aboul-Kazim's harem.

=== Act 2 ===
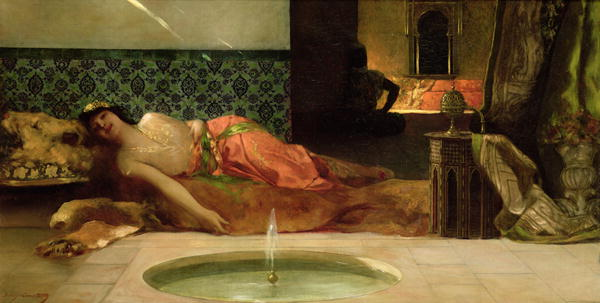
Odalisque by Benjamin-Constant

At the harem of Aboul-Kazim, odalisques languorously sing of the pleasures to be found there: "Doux avenir, joie et plaisir" (Sweet future, joy and pleasure). The Sultan is delighted with Olga and Prascovia. He designates Olga his chief wife and appoints Prascovia as her companion. Lanskoi arrives with an offer of ransom for the two women. Orsakoff is even willing to leave Olga behind if Aboul-Kazim will release Prascovia. The Sultan refuses to release either one. In the meantime, Alexis has revealed his true identity to Olga and they declare their love for each other. Olga and Alexis are finally liberated when Russian officers and troops arrive, aided and abetted by Aboul-Kazim's other wives who wish to get rid of their rivals.

=== Act 3 ===
Olga and General Orsakoff are back at his palace in Moscow. A letter from Prascovia arrives which Lanskoi had concocted to explain her sudden disappearance after her liberation from the harem. In the letter Frasovia tells Orsakoff that she had fled because she loved him too much simply to be his concubine and that she will retire to a convent unless he marries her within three months. The letter had taken six months to arrive, and the General is now determined to find the convent where she is staying. In the meantime, Alexis, dressed in his officer's uniform, has called on Orsakoff to ask for Olga's hand in marriage. Still believing that Alexis is Prascovia's brother, and wishing to curry favour with him, Orsakoff promotes Alexis to captain and aide-de-camp and then to colonel. He also consents to Alexis's marriage to Olga, on the express condition that Alexis consents to his marriage to Prascovia once he finds her.

After Olga and Alexis's marriage has taken place, Lanskoi decides to put an end to Orsakoff's quest for Prascovia once and for all. He concocts another letter from Prascovia to Orsakoff. In it she declares that she is about to commit suicide out of despair at his failure to answer her first letter: "When you read these lines, I shall have ceased to live." Orsakoff accepts that she is now dead. Alexis is spared any future embarrassment, and Orsakoff's vanity is satisfied—a beautiful woman has killed herself because of her great love for him.
