= Eugène Ketterer =

French pianist and composer

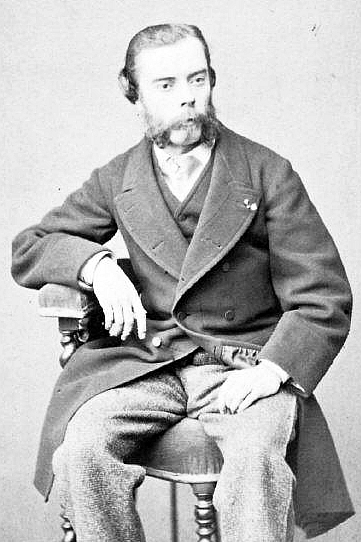

Eugène Ketterer (7 July 1831 – 18 December 1870) was a prolific French composer and pianist who was known for his numerous salon arrangements of contemporary opera arias.

== Career ==
Born in Rouen, France, of an originally Alsatian family, Ketterer became a student at the Paris Conservatoire in his early youth, where he studied with Antoine François Marmontel. He won second prize for solfège in 1847 and a premier accessit in 1852. After his graduation until his death in Paris in 1870, he appeared constantly as a pianist winning wide repute for his fantasies and drawing-room pieces, of which he wrote a large number, but only a few of which are still in the repertoire.

The list of Ketterer's works gives an excellent overview on the world of opera in France at the time, as many of these works are transcriptions of popular opera arias, many still famous today.

Many of Ketterer's transcriptions were subsequently arranged for piano 4-hands by other arrangers like Joseph Rummel (1818–1880) or Édouard Mangin. "Les Étoiles" is a collection of 18 (later 19) such arrangements (1875).

== Evaluation ==
Hervé Lacombe classifies Ketterer among the authors of what he calls derivative products, referring to all the scores of varying degrees of quality drawn (by other composers) from fashionable operas and which "testify to uses proper to the 19th century and to the extraordinary hold operas had on the French musical world" (page 1034). For Lacombe, Ketterer "mass-produced pieces used to shine in salons and concert halls and provide the consumer with nice airs skilfully arranged" (page 1045). He adds further below, about his fantasia on L'Africaine, that "Ketterer selects the most conventional elements of Meyerbeer's score ... and treats them conventionally."

== Compositions ==
=== Piano works ===
- Op. 5 - L'Entrée au tournoi
- Op. 7 - Grand Caprice Hongrois (4-hands)
- Op. 10 - Une Promenade dans la mer
- Op. 16 - Souvenirs de 'La Promise', opéra de Louis Clapisson, Grande fantaisie brillante
- Op. 20 - Fantaisie sur 'Les Sabots de la Marquise', opéra de E. Boulanger
- Op. 21 - L'Argentine, Fantaisie-mazurka
- Op. 22 - Le Chant du Colibri, de l'opéra Jaguarita de F. Halévy, Caprice
- Op. 24 - Grand galop de concert
- Op. 31 - Fandango de l'opéra 'Les Lavandières de Santarem' de Gevaert
- Op. 33 - Fantaisie brillante sur Manon Lescaut, opéra de D. F. E. Auber
- Op. 35 - Ballade
- Op. 39 - Nocturne
- Op. 43 - Les Concerts du bocage, Caprice de genre
- Op. 45 - Fantaisie de concert pour le piano sur Oberon de Weber
- Op. 48 - Dalila, Grande valse brillante
- Op. 56 - Chanson créole
- Op. 57 - Élégie (à la mémoire de Frédéric Chopin)
- Op. 60 - Fantaisie brillante sur Martha, de Flotow
- Op. 61 - Marche écossaise sur Quentin Durward, Musique de Gevaert
- Op. 66 - Oh! Dites lui, romance favorite de Tamberlick, musique de Mme La Princesse L. Kotschoubey
- Op. 68 - Le Pardon de Ploërmel, de Meyerbeer, fantaisie transcription
- Op. 69 - Polka-mazurka sur 'Faust', opéra de Ch. Gounod
- Op. 70 - Herculanum, de Félicien David, fantaisie brillante
- Op. 72 - Le Réveil des sylphes, Fantaisie
- Op. 77 - Fleur de Bruyère, Morceau de salon
- Op. 79 - Fantaisie brillante sur Diane de Solange, opéra en 5 actes de S. A. R. Ernest II duc régnant de Saxe-Cobourg et Gotha
- Op. 82 - Mosaïque sur Don Juan, de Mozart
- Op. 83 - Philémon et Baucis, opéra de Ch. Gounod, Morceau de salon
- Op. 84 - Fantaisie-transcription sur 'Le Roman d'Elvire', opéra-comique d'Ambroise Thomas
- Op. 88 - Mazurka des patineurs. Souvenir du Nord
- Op. 89 - Mélodie allemande (Die Thräne), Morceau de salon
- Op. 90 - La Châtelaine
- Op. 94 - Sérénade complainte de Gil Blas, opéra de Théophile Semet
- Op. 95 - Fantaisie brillante sur 'La Circassienne', opéra d’Auber
- Op. 96 - Fantaisie-transcription sur 'Les Pêcheurs de Catane', d'A. Maillart
- Op. 97 - Il Bacio (d'Arditi), Valse de salon
- Op. 99 - Papillons et fleurs, Caprice
- Op. 101 - Gaëtana, Mazurka
- Op. 106 - La Stella (L'Étoile), 2me valse d'Arditi
- Op. 107 - Fantaisie-transcription sur Rienzi, opéra de R. Wagner
- Op. 109 - Romance du voile sur 'Les Recruteurs', de Lefébure-Wély
- Op. 110 - La Chatte merveilleuse, d'Albert Grisar, Fantaisie brillante
- Op. 111 - Lalla Roukh, Fantaisie-rêverie
- Op. 112 - Fantaisie sur 'Zémire et Azor', opéra de Grétry
- Op. 113 - La Servante maîtresse, opéra comique de Pergolèse, Fantaisie
- Op. 114 - La sonnambula, opéra de Bellini, Fantaisie de concert
- Op. 115 - Illustrations sur Il trovatore, opéra de Verdi
- Op. 116 - Valse des fleurs, Fantaisie de salon
- Op. 117 - Le Réveil des pâtres, Morceau de salon
- Op. 118 - Caprice militaire
- Op. 120 - La Perle du soir
- Op. 121 - Boute-en-train, Galop de concert
- Op. 122 - Transcription brillante sur 'Ah! quel plaisir d'être soldat', de La Dame blanche, de Boïeldieu
- Op. 124 - Les Échos d'Espagne. Mosaïque sur les Chansons d'Yradier
- Op. 125 - 'La Tradita', Romance d'Arditi
- Op. 126 - Fantaisie brillante sur Cosi fan tutte, opéra de Mozart
- Op. 127 - La forza del destino, fantaisie-transcription
- Op. 128 - Fantaisie brillante sur Faust, de Gounod
- Op. 129 - Fantaisie brillante sur 'La Reine de Saba', opéra de Gounod
- Op. 130 - Voici le soleil. Valse chantée d'A. Mutel, transcrite
- Op. 131 - La Mule de Pédro, opéra de Victor Massé, Fantaisie-transcription
- Op. 133 - Divertissement élégant sur Giselle, ballet d'Adolphe Adam
- Op. 134 - Les Vêpres siciliennes, Fantaisie-transcription
- Op. 135 - Rêve d'enfant, mélodie, paroles de Victor Hugo, musique d'Adolphe Nibelle (transcription)
- Op. 136 - Illustrations de Zampa, d'Hérold
- Op. 137 - Fantaisie brillante sur Les Troyens à Carthage, opéra d'Hector Berlioz
- Op. 139 - Le Chant du Bivouac, de Kücken, transcription militaire
- Op. 141 - Marche Styrienne
- Op. 142 - Prière de Moïse, de Rossini, variée
- Op. 143 - Valse des dominos. Grande valse de salon arrangée sur des motifs de Caussinus
- Op. 145 - Fantaisie-transcription sur Rigoletto, opéra de Verdi
- Op. 146 - À Grenade, Ariette espagnole, de Rossini
- Op. 147 - Les Amours du diable (opéra d'Albert Grisar), Fantaisie
- Op. 148 - Lara, opéra-comique de A. Maillart, Chanson arabe (À l'ombre des verts platanes), transcription variée (also, version for piano 4-hands by Édouard Mangin)
- Op. 149 - Mireille, opéra en cinq actes de Ch. Gounod, Fantaisie-transcription
- Op. 150 - Souvenirs mélodiques on Norma, opéra de Bellini, Fantaisie
- Op. 151 - Souvenirs mélodiques Les Puritains, fantaisie sur l'opéra de Bellini
- Op. 152 - Souvenirs mélodiques sur Le Barbier de Séville, opéra de Rossini, Fantaisie
- Op. 153 - Souvenirs mélodiques sur l’opéra Betly, de Donizetti, Fantaisie
- Op. 154 - La Traviata, opéra de Verdi, Fantaisie-transcription
- Op. 155 - Les Chevaliers d'Avenel, ballade écossaise
- Op. 156 - Valse des roses
- Op. 157 - Macbeth, Opéra de Verdi, Fantaisie-transcription
- Op. 161 - Nuit d'Orient, Rêverie
- Op. 162 - Noël, chant religieux de Ferdinand Lavainne
- Op. 163 - Les Absents, opéra de Poise. Fantaisie
- Op. 164 - La flûte enchantée, Fantaisie
- Op. 166 - Le Capitaine Henriot, fantaisie brillante pour piano
- Op. 167 - Le Saphir, opéra de Félicien David, Fantaisie
- Op. 168 - Valse fantastique sur 'MacBeth'
- Op. 169 - Crispino e la Comare, opéra-bouffe des Frères Ricci, Fantaisie élégante
- Op. 170 - Fantaisie de salon sur 'L'Africaine' de Meyerbeer
- (with Auguste Durand) Op. 171 - Faust, opéra en 5 actes de Ch. Gounod (4-hands)
- Op. 173 - L'Âme de la Pologne, cantique de Giovanni Duca, Transcription brillante
- Op. 176 - Deux Transcriptions de salon de l'opéra de Mermet, 'Roland à Roncevaux': Mon coeur se brise (Trio.) et Superbes Pyrénées (Final)
- Op. 177 - Chant du Lido
- Op. 178 - Canzonetta
- Op. 179 - Les Folies, Allegro-galop
- Op. 180 - Souvenir de Florence. Romance de (Rodolfo) Mattiozzi (Quand tu m’aimais), variée
- Op. 181 - Mabel. Valse de Godfrey, Transcription brillante (1865)
- Op. 182 - 'Don Bucefalo', opéra-bouffe de Cagnoni, Fantaisie-transcription
- Op. 183 - Marche arménienne
- Op. 184 - Chanson mauresque de 'La fiancée d’Abydos', opéra de Jules Adenis et Adrien Barthe, Transcription brillante de salon
- Op. 185 - La Proscrite, mélodie de Justin Bru, Transcription de salon
- Op. 186 - Le Voyage en Chine, Fantaisie brillante
- Op. 187 - Colinette à la cour, chœur de Grétry
- Op. 189 - Chansons espagnoles, Fantaisie de concert
- Op. 190 - Nocturne-mazurk sur un motif du ballet de 'la Fidenzata Valacca' de Max. Graziani et R. Mattiozzi
- Op. 191 - Don Juan, opéra de Mozart, Fantaisie pour piano
- Op. 192 - La Rentrée au camp, Caprice-marche
- Op. 194 - La Violette
- Op. 195 - Valse des fées
- Op. 196 - Toast, Chanson à boire
- Op. 197 - Rêve perdu, Ballade
- Op. 198 - Chanson mauresque
- Op. 199 - Sémiramis, opéra de Rossini, Souvenirs mélodiques
- Op. 200 - L'Elisir d'amore, opéra de Donizetti, souvenirs mélodiques pour piano
- Op. 201 - José-María, opéra-comique de Jules Cohen, Fantaisie pour piano
- Op. 202 - Si vous n'avez rien à me dire, romance de Willy de Rothschild
- Op. 203 - Caprice fantaisie sur 'Zilda', opéra comique de F. de Flotow
- Op. 204 - Marche Solennelle
- Op. 205 - Sous les lilas
- Op. 206 - Freyschutz, opéra de Weber, Souvenirs mélodiques
- Op. 207 - Non è ver (Ce n'est pas vrai), romanza de Tito Mattei, transcrite et variée
- Op. 208 - Non tornó! (Il ne vient plus!), romanza de Tito Mattei, transcrite et variée
- Op. 209 - Mignon, opéra d'Ambroise Thomas, Fantaisie brillante
- Op. 210 - Le Désert, de Félicien David, fantaisie brillante
- Op. 211 - Orphée aux enfers de J. Offenbach, Fantaisie brillante
- Op. 213 - Don Carlos, grand opéra de Verdi, Fantaisie brillante
- Op. 214 - Fantaisie de salon sur 'La Grande-Duchesse de Gérolstein'
- Op. 216 - Romeo et Juliette, opéra de Ch. Gounod, Fantaisie de salon
- Op. 217 - Sardanapale, opéra de Victorin Joncières, Souvenirs mélodiques
- Op. 218 - L'Oie du Caire (L'oca del Cairo), opéra-bouffe, Fantaisie
- Op. 219 - Idylle
- Op. 220 - Défilé-marche (de Kaschte), transcription militaire
- Op. 222 - Carlotta-polka
- Op. 223 - Fantaisie brillante sur 'Robinson Crusoé' de J. Offenbach
- Op. 225 - Giovanna d'Arco, opéra de Verdi, fantaisie brillante
- Op. 226 - Romance de 'la lettre des Porcherons', de Grisar, Transcription de salon
- Op. 227 - Le Médecin malgré lui, opéra de Ch. Gounod, Fantaisie brillante
- Op. 228 - Le Premier jour de bonheur, opéra en 3 actes d'Auber, romance, chanson-gigue variés
- Op. 229 - Le Premier jour de bonheur, opéra-comique d'Auber: Les Djinns, mélodie transcrite
- Op. 230 - Hamlet, musique de Ambroise Thomas, Fantaisie brillante
- Op. 231 - La Fête du printemps, fantaisie-ballet sur Hamlet (Thomas), opéra d'Ambroise Thomas
- Op. 232 - Romance et Duo des Hirondelles sur Mignon, de Thomas, Fantaisie
- Op. 233 - Galop de salon de 'Fleur-de-Thé', opéra bouffe de Ch. Lecocq
- Op. 234 - Fantaisie brillante sur 'Les Dragons de Villars', opéra-comique de Maillart
- Op. 229 - Chanson des Djinns, mélodie transcrite (on Le Premier jour de bonheur by Auber)
- Op. 235 - Richard Cœur-de-Lion, opéra de Grétry, Souvenirs mélodiques
- Op. 236 - Le Crociato, opéra de Meyerbeer (Souvenirs mélodiques, No. 22)
- Op. 237 - Beatrice di Tenda, opéra de Bellini (Souvenirs mélodiques, No. 23)
- Op. 238 - Sérénade de J.B. Wekerlin, transcrite et variée
- Op. 239 - Le Chant du régiment, fantaisie militaire sur un chœur de Gevaert
- Op. 240 - Guillaume Tell de Rossini, Fantaisie brillante
- Op. 241 - Un ballo in maschera, opéra de Verdi, Fantaisie brillante
- Op. 242 - Bellone, Caprice militaire
- Op. 243 - Vieille chanson du jeune temps, mélodie de J. O'Kelly, transcrite et variée
- Op. 245 - Bluette
- Op. 246 - Danse bohémienne
- Op. 247 - Carillon-mazurka
- Op. 248 - La Passariello
- Op. 249 - Viens au bord de la mer, mélodie de Ch. Jacques, transcrite et variée
- Op. 250 - Fantaisie de salon sur La Périchole, opéra-Bouffe de J. Offenbach
- Op. 251 - Grande fantaisie brillante sur 'Les Huguenots', opéra de Meyerbeer
- Op. 254 - Succès-polka
- Op. 255 - La Contessina, opéra de Józef Michał Poniatowski, Romanza
- Op. 259 - Fantaisie brillante sur Vert-Vert, opéra-comique de J. Offenbach
- Op. 260 - Messe solennelle Petite messe solennelle, de G. Rossini
- Op. 261 - Grande fantaisie brillante sur Le Prophète, opéra de Meyerbeer
- Op. 263 - Allégresse, Allegro-scherzando
- Op. 264 - La Petite Fadette, de Th. Semet (Théophile Semet), Pastorale
- Op. 267 - Le Chant du berceau
- Op. 268 - Les Clochettes d'or
- Op. 270 - Vienne
- Op. 273 - Havanaise, mélodie de d'E. Paladilhe, Transcription pour le piano
- Op. 274 - Bouquet de bal
- Op. 275 - Au printemps, Mélodie, transcrite et variée
- Op. 276 - La Princesse de Trébizonde, fantaisie élégante pour le piano sur l'opéra-bouffe de J. Offenbach
- Op. 279 - Les Brigands, de J. Offenbach, Fantaisie brillante
- Op. 280 - Mandolinata, Fantaisie quasi-capriccio sur la mélodie de Paladilhe
- Op. 280 - Mia Nera! Sous les palmiers de Bordighiere, Mélodie
- Op. 281 - La Bohémienne, de Balfe, Romance du rêve
- Op. 282 - Fantaisie brillante sur 'La Bohémienne', de M. W. Balfe
- Op. 283 - Envoi de fleurs, mélodie de Gounod (transcription)
- Op. 285 - Valse brillante sur 'Coppelia'
- Op. 286 - Fantaisie brillante sur 'L'Ombre', opéra-comique de F. de Flotow
- Op. 287 - La Marseillaise, de Rouget de Lisle, Paraphrase brillante
- Flick et Flock, Galop du ballet de Hertel (1864)
- Sorrente, mazurka de salon sur une mélodie de J. J. Masset, (1864)

=== Songs ===
- La Fleur des champs, Villanelle (words by Xavier Forneret), 1854
- Sérénade, Poésie et musique d'Anatole Lionnet (accompaniment by Ketterer), 1867

=== Chamber works ===
- (with Adolphe Herman, 1823-1903) Duo for violin and piano after Aimé Maillart's 'Lara' (Herman's Op. 71)
- (with Adolphe Herman) Op. 80 – Grand duo brillant sur 'Le Pardon de Ploërmel', opéra de G. Meyerbeer, for violin and piano
- (with Vincenzo Sighicelli) Op. 105 – Fantaisie espagnole, for violin and piano
- (with Auguste Durand) Op. 143 – La Favorite [de Donizetti]. Fantaisie de concert, for piano and organ
- Op. 165 - Grande fantaisie de concert sur Le Songe d'une nuit d’été de Mendelssohn-Bartholdy, for two pianos
- (with Auguste Durand) Op. 175 – 'L'Africaine', opéra de Meyerbeer, Duo brillant, for piano and organ
- (with Auguste Durand) Op. 188 – Trio on themes from 'La traviata', for violin, piano, and organ
- Don Carlos, Grand opéra de Verdi, Duo concertant pour piano et violon composé par E. Ketterer et A. Vizentini, 1867
- Les Opéras célèbres. Duos concertants sur les Opéras de Verdi composés pour Piano et Violon par E. Ketterer et Ad. (Adolphe) Herman (1868–69) :) Rigoletto; Il trovatore; La Traviata; Un ballo in maschera; Simon Boccanegra; Ernani; I Lombardi alla prima crociata; I due Foscari; Luisa Miller; I Masnadieri; Attila (opera); Aroldo.
- (with Adolphe Herman) 12 Duos concertants sur les chefs d'œuvre lyriques des grands maîtres (1863–1866), for violin and piano: 1. Cosi fan tutte (Herman's Op. 56) (1863); 2. Oberon (Herman's Op. 57) (1863); 3. Don Juan; 4. Otello; 5. Moïse (de Rossini) (Herman's Op. 68) (1864); 6. Norma, de Bellini (Herman's Op. 64) (1864); 7. Les Noces de Figaro; 8. Robin des Bois (de Weber) (Herman's Op. 70) (1864); 9. Le Barbier de Séville (de Rossini) (Herman's Op. 80); 10. L'Elisir d'amore (Herman's Op. 81) (1866); 11. Les Puritains, de Bellini (Herman's Op. 82) (1866); 12. Richard Cœur de Lion, de Grétry (Herman's Op. 83) (1866).

=== Posthumous works ===
- La Favorite, de Donizetti, Fantaisie (1874)
- Bohêma, Caprice de concert (1875 or before)
- Diadème-polka (1875 or before; also arranged for piano 4-hands)
- Eole, Mazurka de salon (1875 or before)
- Moldoa, Caprice russe (1875 or before)
- Le Postillon, Galop (1876 or before)
