= Le portefaix =

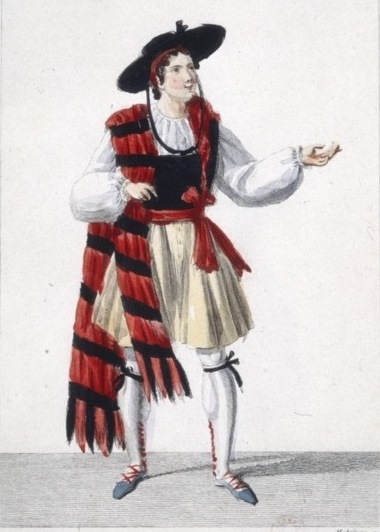
Jean-Baptiste Chollet in costume as Gasparillo, the opera's protagonist

Le portefaix (The Porter) (full title Le portefaix ou le jardinier de Grenade (The Porter, or the Gardener of Grenada)) is an opéra comique in three acts composed by José Melchor Gomis. The libretto by Eugène Scribe is based on an episode in Le Comte de Villamayor by M. Mortonval (Alexandre Furcy Guesdon). It was originally offered to the composer Giacomo Meyerbeer, but he was contracted instead by the opera manager Louis Véron to create a five-act grand opera (Les Huguenots).

The opera was premiered on 16 June 1835 by the Opéra-Comique at the Théâtre des Nouveautés in Paris with Jean-Baptiste Chollet and Jeanne-Emélie Belloste in the lead roles of Gasparillo and Teresita.

== Roles ==
Role	Voice type	Premiere cast, 16 June 1835
Teresita	soprano	Jeanne-Emélie Belloste
Helena	soprano	Geneviève-Aimé-Zoë Prévost
Christina	soprano	Cécile Camoin
Gasparillo	baritone	Jean-Baptiste Chollet
Don Raphael	tenor	Etienne Thénard
Don Ramiro	baritone	François-Louis Henry
Le corrégidor		M. Victor
Soldiers, constables, valets in livery, porters, Spanish women and young girls

== Sources ==
- Letellier, Robert (2014). Meyerbeer’s Les Huguenots: An Evangel of Religion and Love. Cambridge: Cambridge Scholars Publishing. ISBN 9781443860840
