= London Repertoire Orchestra =

The London Repertoire Orchestra is a London-based rehearsal orchestra founded in 1955 (as The One Rehearsal Orchestra) by composer, conductor and oboist Ruth Gipps. Inspired in part by Arthur Dennington's Modern Symphony Orchestra (which had given the premiere performance of Gipps' Oboe Concerto in its 1941–2 season), and by Gwynne Kimpton's London Amateur Orchestra of World War 1, it was intended to provide opportunities for "students, young professionals and good amateurs" to become exposed to a wider range of music. It also provided valuable experience with an orchestra for intending soloists to try through the concerto repertoire. Julian Lloyd Webber was one of those to benefit from this, and later (on 29 September 1972) he gave the first London performance of the Bliss Cello Concerto with Gipps conducting the Chanticleer Orchestra (a professional orchestra which she also founded in 1961).

The London Repertoire Orchestra name was first adopted in 1963. Prince Philip visited the tenth anniversary rehearsal in 1965, requesting a programme of all British music. The baton was passed from Gipps to Francis Griffin (a professional horn player and conductor) in 1986, and he served as musical director until 2009. Today the orchestra does not have a permanent conductor, choosing to use a selection of regular freelance conductors and guests from a pool of professionals who would not be able to commit to a weekly rehearsal.

Since it was founded, the LRO has typically rehearsed a different work each week, normally finishing with a complete run-through. However, when playing for concerts the orchestra dedicates a full rehearsal session for each piece and has a full rehearsal on the day of the concert, including guest players. In its early days rehearsals were held at the International Musicians Association premises at 14 South Audley Street, then a somewhat notorious drinking club as well as a rehearsal space, frequented by writers and musicians including Kingsley Amis, John Dickson Carr, Gerald Hoffnung, Bruce Montgomery and Malcolm Arnold.

But in 1958 the Inner London Education Authority recognised the growing reputation of the orchestra and offered an affiliation, providing a rehearsal space (the Salle Erard Hall, 18 Great Marlborough Street) and salaries for the conductor and leader. By the 1980s, chamber rehearsals (on Wednesdays) and full orchestral (on Fridays) were being held at Kingsway College in Clerkenwell. Today rehearsals take place at St Joseph's Church Hall, Lamb's Passage, London EC1 on Wednesday evenings during term times.

The orchestra is a registered charity. Members pay an annual subscription to join.
