= La Montagne Noire =

1884 opera by Augusta Holmès

La Montagne Noire The Black Mountain
- Opera by Augusta Holmès
- Original background of Marcel Jambon fort the premiere of La Montagne Noire
- Native title: La Montagne Noire
- Librettist: Augusta Holmès
- Language: Italian
- Premiere: 8 February 1895; Paris Opera, Paris

La Montagne noire is a lyric drama in four acts and five scene by Augusta Holmès from 1884 and created in 1895.

== Historical context ==
Augusta Holmès begin to compose La Montagne noire in 1884 with a libretto by her own hand. It was predicted to be a great success by Édouard Dujardin. The story is inspired by an oriental custom which consists in uniting two men by the oath to consider themselves as brothers, even if it means sacrificing their lives for the other. This is the subject of the drama, the passionate part of which is reminiscent of Carmen.

== Creation ==
The work was first performed at the Paris Opera on 8 February 1895. The staging was done by Alexandre Lapissida, the vocal director was Édouard Mangin and the choir director L. Delahaye, the choreography by Joseph Hansen, the sets by Marcel Jambon and the costumes by Charles Bianchini.

== Characters ==
| Role | Voice | Creation, 8 February 1895 (conductor : Paul Taffanel) |
|---|---|---|
| Yamina | soprano | Lucienne Bréval |
| Mirko | tenor | Albert Alvarez |
| Dara | mezzo-soprano | Meyrianne Heglon |
| Aslar | baryton | Maurice Renaud |
| Héléna | soprano | Lucy Berthet |
| Le père Sava | bass | André Gresse |
| Chefs des Monténégrins | | Douaillier, Gallois, Chancelier, Laurent, Devriès, Pallanti, Idrac, Desnoyers |
| Une almée | | Torri |
| Guerriers monténégrins, joueurs de guzla, hommes et femmes du peuple, femmes turques, danseuses, jeunes esclaves turcs | | Chœurs |

== Abstract ==
The action takes place in 1657 in Montenegro, then in a village on the Turkish border.

=== Act I ===
Act I takes place in fortified ruins in the mountains. After a terrible war between Montenegro and Turkey, one of the Montenegrin victors, Mirko, has been proclaimed brother-in-arms of the brave Aslar. The priest unites them at the foot of the holy altars, and to acknowledge this honour, Aslar has sworn to watch over Mirko's body and soul. Mirko is to marry a young girl, Helena. In the midst of the general rejoicing, a woman, pursued by soldiers, bursts in. She is Turkish and her name is Yamina. The crowd, taking her for a spy, wants to put her to death. Mirko, struck by her beauty, intercedes for her, but not without making her confess that she is a courtesan and that she followed the sons of the Prophet into battle. At Mirko's request, Dara, his mother, takes her as a slave. The act ends with a chorus of drinkers.

=== Act II ===
Act II takes place in a village in the mountains. In Act II, Yamina's beautiful eyes and provocative poses have done their work. Mirko, madly in love with the foreigner, remains deaf to his fiancée's pleas. The two lovers flee while Héléna denounces them to the public.

=== Act III ===
Act III takes place in a wild mountain setting. The two lovers are in each other's arms. Yamina, dead tired, falls asleep, while Mirko watches over her. Suddenly, Aslar appears. He reproaches his brother for his betrayal. Mirko, moved by his words, agrees to follow him, after a last kiss to the still sleeping Yamina. As Aslar could have foreseen, this kiss wakes Yamina up. She has no trouble getting hold of the young Montenegrin, which makes Aslar very angry. During the discussion, the young woman treacherously hits the man whose arrival has thwarted her plans. Fortunately, the blow was badly struck, and when the 'mountain men' come running to Mirko's desperate cries, all danger seems to have passed. As the stage empties, Yamina swears revenge.

=== Act IV ===
The first scene of Act IV takes place in a garden on the edge of Yamina's home on the Turkish border, the second shows the scene after the fight. Mirko, more in love than ever, is in the power of the beautiful bewitchress whose kiss burns him. Female singers and almaeums delightfully frame the scene. The situation from the previous act is repeated. Aslar, who has once again felt the need to stir up Mirko, arrives as a spoilsport. Only this time he avoids being hit and, seeing that his pleas are in vain, he kills his brother-in-arms to save his soul and then turns the weapon against himself.

== Criticism ==
The reception was lukewarm, even a failure, due in particular to the weakness of the score and the libretto. Claude Debussy wrote about it in his book Monsieur Croche et autres écrits: "An opera: La Montagne noire, had no success; this is of no importance and cannot make us forget what we owe him in terms of charming and robust music ". Although La Montagne noire was a failure, it does not make us forget the success of Augusta Holmès' symphonies (Roland furieux and Lutèce) or her various symphonic poems (Hymne à Apollon, Les Argonautes, Irlande, Andromède and Pologne).

Les interprètes ont été loués, notamment Lucienne Bréval, considérée comme chanteuse et comédienne inégalable, aux irrésistibles enchantements dans le rôle de Yamina, et Meyrianne Héglon, véritable tragédienne lyrique. Albert Alvarez et Maurice Renaud sont aussi félicités.

Several magazines reported on it, including Le Monde artistique, which gave it an extensive review. Quoting Camille Saint-Saëns about the composer's Argonautes, which he himself had enjoyed, Fernand Le Borne had mixed feelings about Augusta Holmès' opera. He described the work as a collection of 'heroic sentiments contrasting with voluptuous scenes', but noted that there was a clear difference between the opera and the symphonic poem. While the orchestration did not lose its ardour between 1880 and 1884, the author notes a loss of the ardour and intransigence with which the composer modulates 'frequently contenting herself with loving modulation from tonic to dominant'. Fernand Le Borne also notes that the orchestration does not sound, remaining dull and grey when it should have been bright. For him, the instrumental texture lacks body, with a loss of middle harmonies, leaving the bass and treble uncovered. There is also a dissonance between the orchestration and the situation on stage. Although the critic emphasises the presence of motifs, he doubts that the composer has used them in the manner of Wagnerian leitmotifs. For him, the lyric drama would therefore be closer to an opera, leaving an ordinary work, lacking modernity and personality.

According to Arthur Pougin in Le Ménestrel, the best pages are the passages of gentleness, grace and tenderness, while the pages that are intended to be energetic are only noisy and banal, with the exception of the introductory scene in Act I. One of the most successful passages is Yamina's lied-like aria 'Près des flots d'une mer bleue et lente' in Act II, which illustrates the captive's lament for her homeland. The same applies to the duet of Mirko and Yamina in the third act, when they arrive in the forest. Apart from these passages, the author emphasises the lack of momentum, energy and expression in the play as a whole, making for an uneven drama.

Georges d'Heylli wrote in the Gazette anecdotique: "Mme Holmès has perhaps presumed her strength in seeking to triumph both as a librettist and as a musician", denying her the title of playwright and describing her opera as severe, although he concedes a few skilfully treated scenes, and several very welcome melodies.

For Ély-Edmond Grimard, the failure of this opera was due in particular to the weakness of the libretto written by the composer. He wrote in Les Annales politiques et littéraires that, unlike Richard Wagner, whom she imitated, she evoked history and not legend. According to the author, the adaptation is banal and the plot mediocre. The music, which is sometimes lyrical, often lacks energy. He adds that the instrumentation is far from reminiscent of Richard Wagner or César Franck, but sometimes briefly recalls Jules Massenet in Le Roi de Lahore. The interpretation is good, and he simply notes the vocal and plastic qualities of Lucienne Bréval and Lucie Berthet.

== Modern revival ==
A rare revival took place at Theater Dortmund in January 2024.
