= Himno de Riego =

Former Spanish national anthem (1822–23, 1873–74 and 1931–39)

English: Riego's Anthem
- National anthem of Spanish Republic
- Lyrics: Evaristo Fernández de San Miguel, 1820
- Music: José Melchor Gomis, 1820
- Adopted: 1822, 1873 and 1931
- Relinquished: 1823, 1874 and 1939

Audio sample
- with lyrics: file; help

Instrumental recording of the anthem

The "Himno de Riego" ("Riego's Anthem") is a song dating from the Trienio Liberal (1820–1823) of Spain and named in honour of Colonel Rafael del Riego, a figure in the respective uprising, which restored the liberal constitution of 1812. The lyrics were written by Evaristo Fernández de San Miguel, while the music is typically attributed to José Melchor Gomis.

It was declared the national anthem of Spain in 1822, remaining so until the overthrow of the liberal government the next year in 1823, and was also one of the popular anthems used in the First Spanish Republic (1873–1874) and, with much more prominence, the Second Spanish Republic (1931–1939). It continued to be used by the Second Republican government in exile until it was dissolved in 1977 upon the end of the Francoist Spanish State in 1975.

== History ==
The "Himno de Riego" was written between 31 January and 6 February 1820 in the town of Algeciras by Evaristo Fernández de San Miguel, lieutenant colonel of the flying column headed by Rafael del Riego, who had previously rejected another text by Antonio Alcalá Galiano.

It was declared the official national anthem of Spain on 7 April 1822 when the Cortes Generales approved the corresponding decree, which was signed by King Fernando VII in Aranjuez two days later and finally published in the Gaceta de Madrid on 14 April. However, the liberal government was overthrown and the constitution repealed by Fernando VII in October 1823, with the Marcha Real resuming its role as the national anthem.

In the First Republic of 1873 to 1874, part of the greater 1868–1874 Sexenio Democrático achieved by the overthrow of Isabella II in the Glorious Revolution, the anthem occupied a discreet position; the most popular anthems used at this time were "La Marseillaise" and the "Himno de Garibaldi". However, by the time of the Second Republic of 1931 to 1939, the anthem had once again gained popularity to the point of becoming the primary institutional representative of the government during this period.

Contrary to popular belief, the "Himno de Riego" was never declared the official anthem of the Second Republic. According to one opinion, it can be deduced that the republicans did not consider the 1822 declaration of the song as the national anthem superseded or repealed.

== Lyrics ==
=== Original lyrics (1820–1823) ===
The following is the original version used during the Trienio Liberal (1820–1823).

Spanish	English
Refrain: Soldados, la patria nos llama a la lid; Juremos por ella vencer o prefiero morir. Serenos, alegres, valientes, osados, Cantemos, soldados, el himno a la lid. Y a nuestros acentos el orbe se admire Y en nosotros mire los hijos del Cid. Refrain Blandamos el hierro que el tímido esclavo Del libre, del bravo, la faz no osa ver. Sus huestes cual humo veréis disipadas, Y a nuestras espadas fugaces correr. Refrain ¿El mundo vio nunca, más noble osadía? ¿Ni vio nunca un día más grande el valor, Que aquel, inflamados, nos vimos del fuego, Excitar a Riego de Patria el amor? Refrain Honor al caudillo, honor al primero Que el cívico acero osó fulminar. La patria afligida oyó sus acentos Y vió sus tormentos en gozo tornar. Refrain Su voz fué seguida, su voz fué escuchada, Tuvimos en nada soldados morir. Y osados quisimos romper la cadena Que de afrenta llena del bravo el vivir. Refrain Mas ya la alarma tocan; las armas tan sólo El crimen, el dolo, podrán abatir. Que tiemblen, que tiemblen, que tiemble el malvado Al ver al soldado la lanza esgrimir. Refrain La trompa guerrera sus ecos al viento, Horror al sediento, ya ruge el cañón. A Marte sañudo la audacia provoca Y el ingenio invoca de nuestra nación. Refrain Se muestran: volemos, volemos, soldados. ¿Los veis aterrados, su frente bajar? Volemos, que el libre por siempre ha sabido del siervo vendido la audacia humillar. Refrain	Refrain: Soldiers, the homeland calls us to the fight; Let us swear for her sake to triumph or I prefer to die. Serene and happy, valiant and bold Let us sing, soldiers, the battle hymn. The world be astonished at our voices And in us behold the sons of the Cid. Refrain We brandish the iron that the timid slave Of the free man, of the brave man, the face does not dare to see. Like smoke, you will see his host dissipated And run to our fleeting swords. Refrain Has the world ever seen more noble daring? Nor has any day seen greater valour, Than that, inflamed, we showed at the fire, To awaken in Riego the love of his land? Refrain Honour to the leader, honour to the first That the civic sword dared to strike down. The afflicted homeland heard their voices And saw their torments turn into joy. Refrain His voice was followed, his voice was heard, We had soldiers dying in nothing. And we bold ones wanted to break the chain That fills the brave man with disgrace to live. Refrain But the alarm is already sounding; only weapons Will be able to bring down crime, fraud. Let them tremble, let them tremble, let the wicked man tremble At the sight of the soldier wielding the spear. Refrain The war trumpet echoes to the winds, Affrighting the greedy, the cannon now roars. The audacity of our nation provokes And the genius [of our nation] invokes wrathful Mars. Refrain They show themselves: let us fly, let us fly, soldiers. Do you see them terrified, their head lowering? Let us fly, such that the free man has always known Of the sold servant, the audacity bowing. Refrain

=== First short version (1931–1939) ===
The following is the version used during the Second Spanish Republic (1931–1939). It consisted of verses one, three and seven of the original version, with a few minor lyrical changes.

Spanish	English
Serenos y alegres, valientes y osados, Cantemos, soldados, el himno a la lid. De nuestros acentos el orbe se admire Y en nosotros mire los hijos del Cid. Refrain: Soldados, la patria nos llama a la lid. Juremos por ella vencer o morir. El mundo vio nunca, más noble osadía, Ni vio nunca un día más grande el valor, Que aquel, inflamados, nos vimos del fuego, Excitar a Riego de Patria el amor. Refrain La trompa guerrera sus ecos al viento, Horror al sediento, ya ruge el cañón. A Marte sañudo la audacia provoca Y el ingenio invoca de nuestra nación. Refrain	Serene and happy, valiant and bold Let us sing, soldiers, the battle hymn. The world is astonished at our voices And in us it beholds the sons of the Cid. Refrain: Soldiers, the homeland calls us to the fight. Let us swear for her sake to triumph or to die. The world never saw more noble daring, Nor any day greater valour was shown, Than that, inflamed, we showed at the fire, To awaken in Riego the love of his land. Refrain The war trumpet echoes to the winds, Affrighting the greedy, the cannon now roars. The audacity of our nation provokes And the genius [of our nation] invokes wrathful Mars. Refrain

=== Second short version ===
The following version consists of the first and last verses of the original, with a few minor lyrical changes.

Spanish	English
Serenos y alegres, valientes y osados, Cantemos, soldados, un himno a la lid. Y a nuestros acentos el orbe se admire Y en nosotros mire los hijos del Cid. Refrain: Soldados, la patria nos llama a la lid. Juremos por ella vencer o morir. Se muestran: volemos, volemos, soldados. ¿Los veis aterrados, sus frentes bajar? Volemos, que el libre por siempre ha sabido del siervo vencido su frente humillar.	Serene and happy, valiant and bold Let us sing, soldiers, a battle hymn. And the world is astonished at our voices And in us it beholds the sons of the Cid. Refrain: Soldiers, the homeland calls us to the fight. Let us swear for her sake to triumph or to die. They show themselves: let us fly, let us fly, soldiers. Do you see them terrified, their heads lowering? Let us fly, such that the free man has always known Of the defeated servant, his head bowing.

== Satirical lyrics ==
This alternative version was extremely popular amongst Spaniards, particularly in Catalonia, during the Spanish Civil War. The rudeness of the lyrics reflects the dislike of Republican Spain for the church and the monarchy. After the war, these lyrics continued to be sung by Franco's detractors and enemies.

(Spanish)
Si los curas y frailes supieran,
la paliza que les van a dar,
subirían al coro cantando:
"¡Libertad, libertad, libertad!"

(Spanish)
Si los Reyes de España supieran
lo poco que van a durar,
a la calle saldrían gritando:
"¡Libertad, libertad, libertad!"

(Catalan)
La Reina vol corona?
Corona li darem...
que vingui a Barcelona
I el coll li tallarem!^{*}

(Spanish)
Un hombre estaba cagando,
y no tenía papel,
pasó el Rey Alfonso XIII
¡Y se limpió el culo con él!

If priests and monks knew;
the beating they're going to receive,
they'd make a chorus and sing:
"Liberty, liberty, liberty!"

If the Kings of Spain knew
how little they're going to last,
they'd go out on the street and sing:
"Liberty, liberty, liberty!"

The queen wants a crown?
We'll give her a crown...
Let her come to Barcelona
And we'll cut her head off!

A man was pooping
But had no paper.
King Alfonso XIII came by
So he wiped his ass with him.

^{*}Spanish translation of Catalan verse
¿La reina quiere corona?
Corona le daremos
que venga a Barcelona
¡Y el cuello le cortaremos!

== Incidents involving the incorrect use of the anthem ==
=== 1952 Cusco Cathedral bell dedication ceremony ===
Che Guevara claims that, when the famous bell of the Cusco Cathedral in Peru was rededicated at the expense of the Francoist Spanish government after a 1950 earthquake, the bell was made to play the Spanish national anthem, which then erroneously played the Himno de Riego, to the consternation of attending Spanish officials.

=== 1968 European championship controversy ===
On October 1, 1967, during the qualifying stage for the European championship in Prague, the "Himno de Riego" was performed by mistake instead of the then official anthem of Spain "Marcha Real".

=== 2003 Davis Cup controversy ===
At the 2003 Davis Cup finals held in Australia, James Morrison performed "Himno de Riego" instead of Spain's current national anthem, the "Marcha Real" (Royal March). Australian tennis officials claimed there was an error on the CD provided to the musician, but Spanish sport authorities still issued an official protest.

== Notes ==
1.Used by the Government in Exile until its dissolution in 1977.
