= Louis Monrose =

French actor

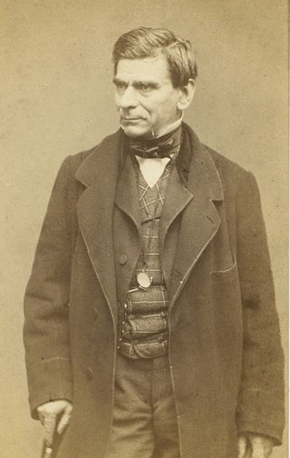
Portrait of Louis Monrose by Étienne Carjat.

Antoine-Martial Louis Barizain also called Louis Monrose or Monrose (1811–1883) was a 19th-century French actor. The actor Claude Louis Séraphin Barizain (1783-1843) was his father. The actress Mademoiselle Monrose was his step sister due to her marriage with his brother, Eugène (Barizain).

He was appointed a professor at the Conservatory in 1867. He was Lucien Guitry's first drama teacher and also taught the comedian Lucie Manvel.

== Theatre ==
=== Career at the Comédie-Française ===
Admission in 1833
Appointed 275th sociétaire in 1852
Leave in 1869
