= Mademoiselle Monrose =

French actress and operatic soprano

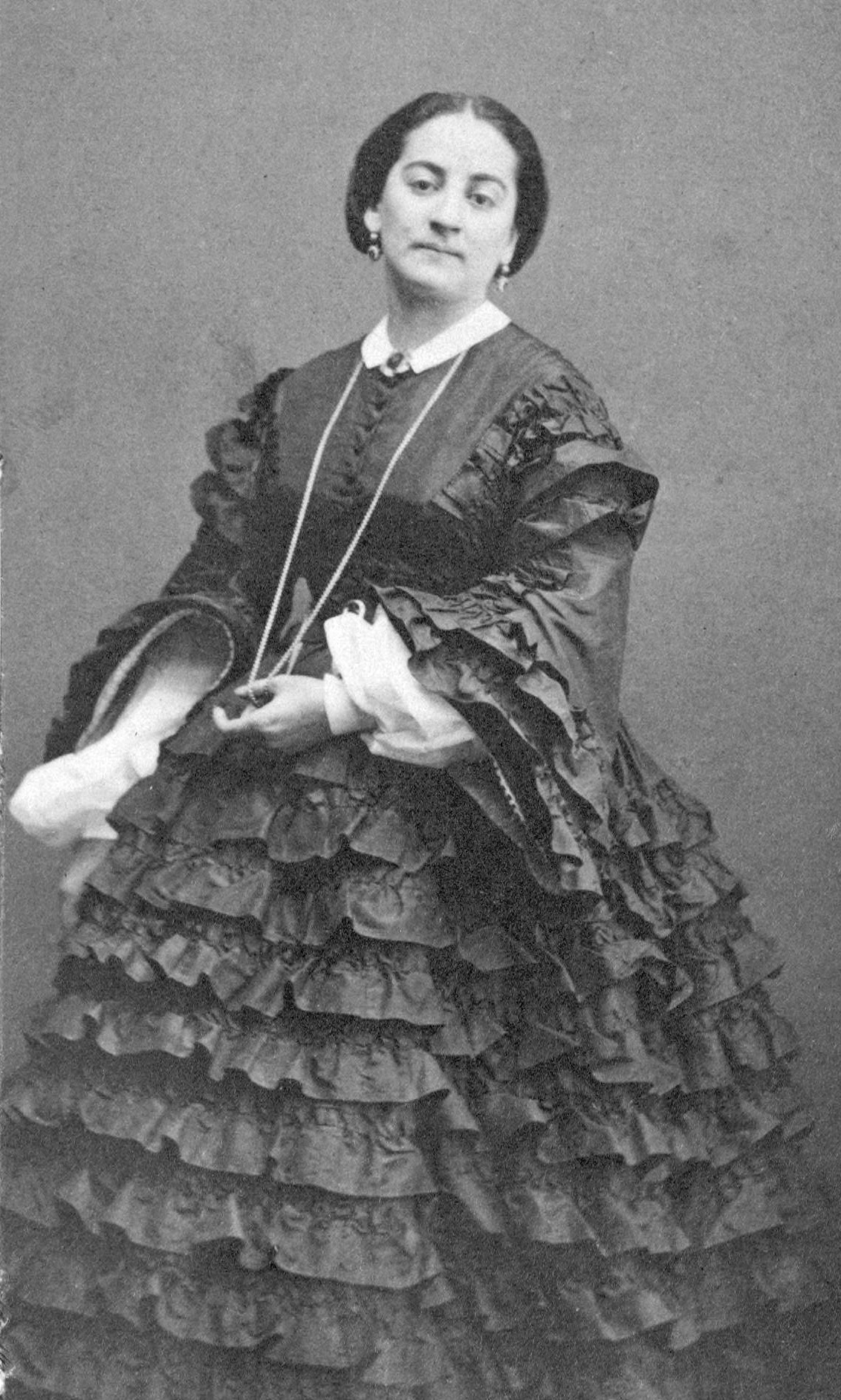
Mlle Monrose (1861)

Mademoiselle Monrose (née Marie-Florentine Chollet; November 11, 1816 – April 10, 1893) was a French actress and operatic soprano who made her debut at the Opéra-Comique in 1859.

== Early life and training ==
Marie-Florentine Chollet was born in Paris on November 11, 1816, the daughter of the famous French tenor Jean-Baptiste Chollet and soprano Geneviève-Aimé-Zoë Prévost. She married Eugène Monrose (né Barizain), brother of Louis Monrose, both members of a famous family of actors associated with the Comédie-Française, who all used the stage name of Monrose. She studied voice with Gilbert Duprez.

== Career ==
Her debut at the Opéra-Comique was on 24 September 1859 in Ambroise Thomas's Le songe d'une nuit d'été (with Giacomo Meyerbeer in the audience), and she created the role of La Marquise de Villa-Bianca in Thomas's Le roman d'Elvire, premiered on 4 February 1860 by the Opéra-Comique at the second Salle Favart in Paris. She also sang Dinorah in a revival of Giacomo Meyerbeer's Le pardon de Ploërmel, "entirely to the satisfaction of the maestro Meyerbeer. That's all there is to say."

Another creation was Olga in Daniel Auber's La circassienne, premiered on 2 February 1861 by the Opéra-Comique at the second Salle Favart. The Musical World (16 February) found her "perfectly dazzling with grace and beauty in her three rich costumes, ... especially in the first act, in which her entrance enchanted the whole house." Vocally, her portrayal in the quartet in the first act was "charming and natural" and in the challenging ballad à vocalises, grand air, and love duet of the third act, "graceful and already brilliant" without however being at the level of a Laure Cinti-Damoreau or Caroline Miolan-Carvalho.

Another role was La Marquise de Richmond in the Opéra-Comique's revival of Albert Grisar's Le joaillier de Saint-James on 17 February 1862.

She also created the role of Héro in Hector Berlioz's Béatrice et Bénédict on 9 August 1862 at the Theater der Stadt, Baden-Baden. Berlioz thought her "entirely devoid of musical instincts" but found her voice "fresh and natural" and well suited to the part.

She was later associated with the Théâtre du Parc in Brussels and the Théâtre des Galeries, Brussels. She retired from singing c. 1880, receiving a pension of 500 francs in 1883 (at age 65). She died in Brussels on April 10, 1893.
