= Claude Louis Séraphin Barizain =

French actor (1783–1843)

Claude Louis Séraphin Barizain (December 6, 1783 – 1843) was a French actor, known as Monrose.

He was born in Besançon, and was already playing children's parts at the time of the Revolution.

He was called to the Comédie-Française in 1815, and was received sociétaire in 1817. A small, active man, with mobile and expressive features and quick, nervous gestures, he was noted as the rascally servant in such plays as Le Barbier de Séville and Les Fourberies de Scapin.

His son, Louis Martial Barizain (1811–1883), also called Monrose, was also an actor. He succeeded Joseph Isidore Samson as professor at the Conservatoire in 1866.
