= Fatinitza =

Operetta by Franz von Suppé

- Operetta by Franz von Suppé
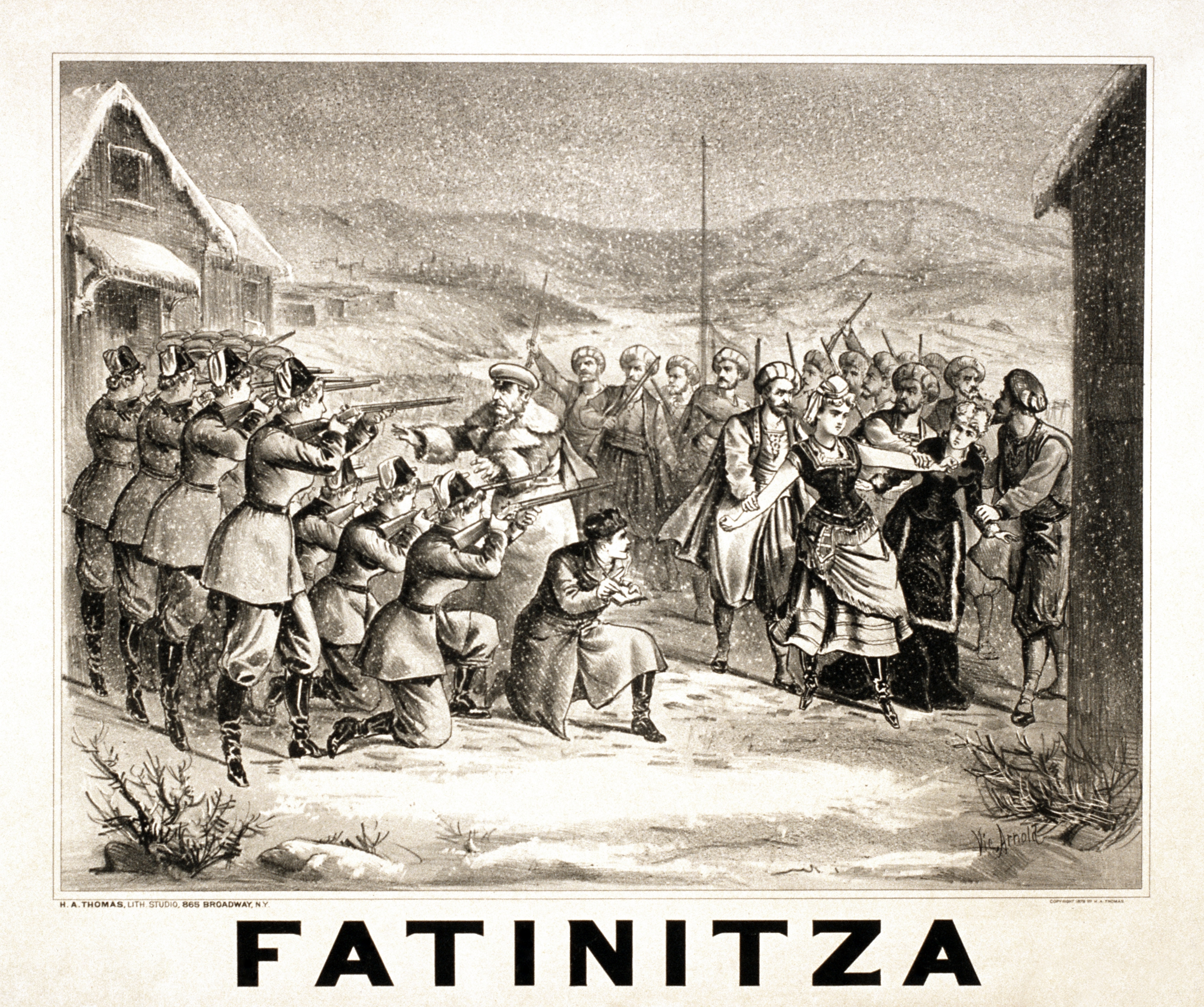
- Poster, c. 1879
- Librettist: F. Zell; Richard Genée
- Language: German
- Based on: Eugène Scribe's libretto to La circassienne
- Premiere: 5 January 1876; Carltheater, Vienna

Fatinitza was the first full-length, three-act operetta by Franz von Suppé. The libretto by F. Zell (a pseudonym for Camillo Walzel) and Richard Genée was based on the libretto to La circassienne by Eugène Scribe (which had been set to music by Daniel Auber in 1861), but with the lead role of Wladimir, a young Russian lieutenant who has to disguise himself as a woman, changed to a trousers role; in other words, a woman played the part of the man who pretended to be a woman.

It premièred on 5 January 1876, at the Carltheater Vienna, and proved a huge success, running for more than a hundred performances, with the march "Vorwärts mit frischem Muth", proving a particular hit. The operetta as a whole is no longer in the popular repertory, but the overture is performed as a stand-alone piece.

== Background ==
Viennese operetta sprang out of an attempt by Viennese composers to imitate Jacques Offenbach's works, after the highly successful performance of Le mariage aux lanternes at the Carltheater in 1858. Franz von Suppé was the most notable of these early composers, and proved instrumental in defining the new subgenre. Grove Music Online names Suppé's Das Pensionat (1860) as "the first successful attempt at a genuine Viennese operetta", and this was followed by several more successes, for Suppé, including Flotte Bursche (1863) and Die schöne Galathée (1865). However, until Fatinitza in 1876, Suppé did not write a full-length operetta, and, despite the successes of his shorter works, neither he, nor other Viennese composers such as Giovanni von Zaytz, were able to compete with Offenbach for popularity throughout the 1860s.

Offenbach's dominance was finally challenged with the arrival of Johann Strauss II upon the scene in the 1870s, with works such as Indigo und die vierzig Räuber, Der Karneval in Rom, Die Fledermaus, and others serving to develop and codify the genre Suppé had begun laying out.

Suppé finally tried his hand at a full-length operetta in 1876. F. Zell (a pseudonym for Camillo Walzel) and Richard Genée, who had previously adapted the French play Le Réveillon into Strauss's Die Fledermaus – the "most celebrated of all Viennese operas" according to the musicologist Andrew Lamb – returned to French sources, adapting Eugène Scribe's libretto from Daniel Auber's La circassienne (1861) into Fatinitza. The work premièred at the Carltheater on 5 January 1876, and would prove to be an international success.

== Roles ==
Note: This article uses the names found in the original German libretto. Translations of Fatinitza may change characters' names to a greater or lesser extent.

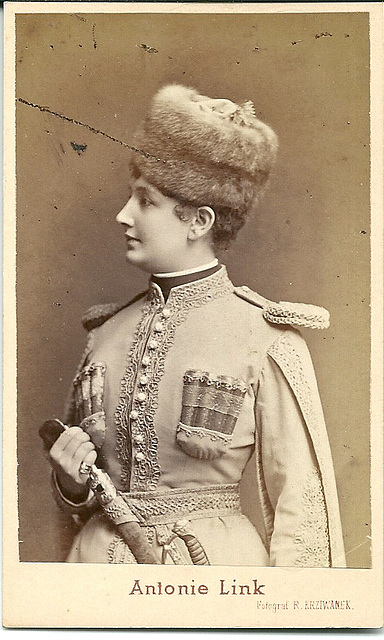
Antonie Link as Fatinitza

Roles, voice types, premiere cast
Roles	Premiere cast 5 January 1876
Count Timofey Gawrilowitsch Kantschukoff, A Russian General	Wilhelm Knaack
Princess Lydia Iwanowna Uschakoff, Kantschukoff's Niece	Hermine Meyerhoff
Izzet Pascha, Governor of the Turkish Fortress at Rustchuk	Josef Matras
Captain Wasil Andrejwitsch Starawieff	
Lieutenant Osipp Wasielowitsch Safonoff	
Iwan, Nikiphor, Fedor, Dimitri, Wasili, Michailow, Casimir, and Gregor, Cadets	
Steipann Sidorewitsch Bieloscurim, A Sergeant	
Wladimir Dimitrowitsch Samoiloff, Lieutenant of a Circassian Cavalry Regiment, sometimes disguised as Fatinitza.	Antonie Link
Julian von Golz, Special War Correspondent for a major German newspaper	Karl Blasel
Hassan-Beh, Leader of a Squad of Bashi-Bazouks.	
Nursidah, Zuleika, Diona, and Besika, Izzet Pascha's Wives	
Mustapha, Guardian of the Harem	
Wuika, A Bulgarian Spy	
Hanna, Wuika's Wife	
A Cossack	
A Military Cook	
Chorus of Russian soldiers, Bashi-Bazouks, Cossacks, Moorish Women, Nubian Women, Russian Serfs, Sleigh Drivers, etc.

== Synopsis ==
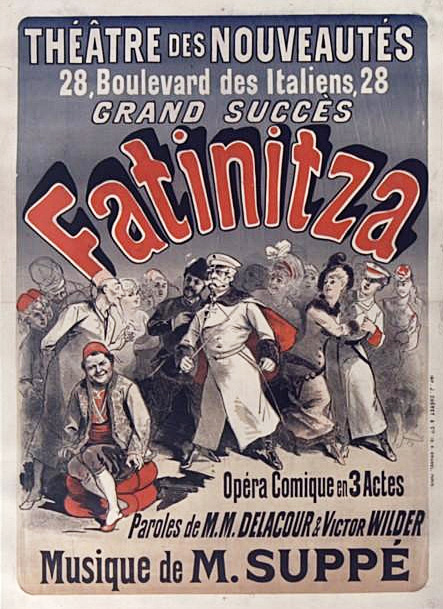
1879 French poster

Before the piece begins, Wladimir Samoiloff, a young Russian Lieutenant, had an adventure in which he ended up disguising himself as a woman (whom he named Fatinitza), and met with the hot-tempered elderly General Kantschukoff, who fell in love with his disguise. Wladimir, however, is in love with the General's niece, Lydia.

The operetta opens on a camp of Russian soldiers near Rustchuk, where Wladimir has been assigned. His friend, Julian, a special newspaper correspondent, is mistaken for a spy and dragged to the camp, but Wladimir defuses the situation. Julian and Wladimir reminisce about his Fatinitza disguise, which eventually leads the soldiers to consider some amateur theatre, to relieve the boredom. As no women are present, Wladimir resumes his Fatinitza disguise.

The General arrives, and recognises "Fatinitza" as his lost love, and Wladimir finds himself needing to play along in order to protect his men from the general's anger at the theatrical costumes, which are not the regulation uniform. His niece Lydia soon arrives, and recognises Wladimir under the disguise. Julian tells the two that Fatinitza is Wladimir's sister. The general temporarily leaves the three to see how the other soldiers are getting on, but, as the first act ends, a band of bashi-bazouks manage to catch the camp by surprise, and take "Fatinitza" and Lydia prisoner. Julian scrambles the Russian soldiers to return the attack, but the General refuses to allow them to fire, lest they hit Fatinitza.

The second act opens in the Turkish fortress, run by Izzit Pascha. Pascha has four wives, and wishes to add Lydia to his harem. His wives are highly upset at this, and "Fatinitza" persuades them to aid in his and Lydia's escape, revealing his true identity at the end.

Julian and a Russian Sergeant, Steipann, arrive to attempt to negotiate Lydia and "Fatinitza"'s freedom, but Pascha will only release Lydia. However, Wladimir is able to pass on a message, and, while Julian distracts Pascha, Steipann arranges for the soldiers to slip into the fortress, effecting a rescue.

However, all is not well with the love triangle as the third act opens. The General sent out news of rewards should Fatinitza be found, and has now received word that she has been found (much to Julian and Wladimir's confusion). As Lydia lives with him, the General, unaware of Wladimir's love for her, but wanting to be alone with Fatinitza, has promised Lydia in marriage to an old, crippled friend of his, who had the advantage of being available for marriage. He does not want to break his word to his friend, but when Wladimir announces he has promised his "sister" to one of his friends, the General agrees to break Lydia's betrothal if Wladimir will break Fatinitza's.

The promised Fatinitza arrives, but turns out to be an old woman of the same name. Julian and Wladimir produce a letter from the "real" Fatinitza, "discovering" that she died of grief when separated from the General. In her memory, he gives his niece to "Fatinitza's brother".

=== Legacy ===
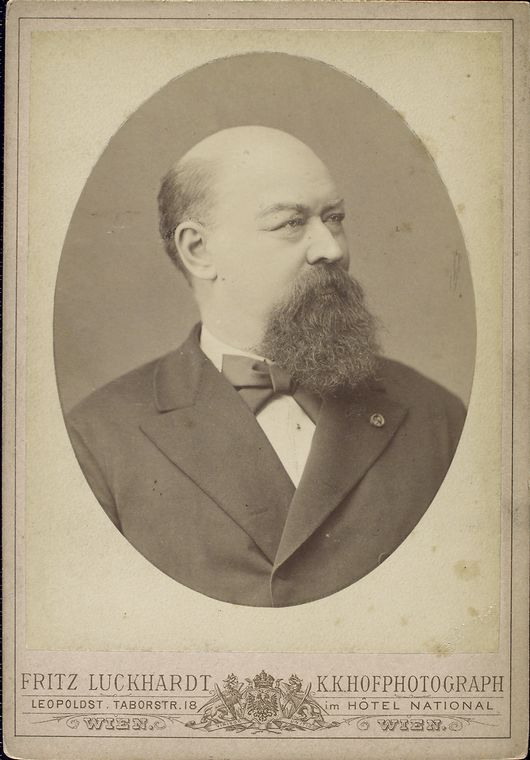
Publicity photo of Franz von Suppė, taken by Fritz Luckhardt

Although rarely performed today, at the time, Fatinitza was an international success. The composer, lyricists, and theatre would reunite for two more international successes in their next two productions: Boccaccio (1879), Suppé's best-known and most popular operetta; and another cross-dressing army opera in Donna Juanita (1880). However, after these successes, Suppé's later operettas proved less popular with audiences, and, according to the musicologist Andrew Lamb, were also of lower quality.

The work was translated back to French by Félix Coveliers for a production at the Fantaisies-Parisiennes in Brussels, which opened on 28 December 1878, despite concerns from Scribe's widow. However, in Paris, she refused permission for the Gaîté to mount the work in that form, and the directors of the Théâtre des Nouveautés, Boulevard des Italiens, therefore procured a much altered libretto from Alfred Delacour and Victor Wilder, and in this form the Paris première was produced at that theatre on 15 March 1879, with costumes by Grévin, running for 59 nights. Revived in April 1882, the production received 55 more performances, with Marguerite Ugalde in the title role.

Other early translations include an 1876 Czech translation by E. Züngel for a performance in Prague; two Swedish versions for 1876 Stockholm performances by A. Lindgren and E. A. Wallmark, respectively; an 1877 Italian translation by V. A. Bacichi for a performance in the Teatro Sannazaro, Naples; English translations for the Alhambra Theatre, London, in 1878 by H. S. Leigh; and by J. B. Polk for an 1879 New York production; an 1879 Polish translation performed in Lemberg; a Portuguese translation by Ed. Garrido and A. Azevedo for an 1881 Rio de Janeiro production; an 1887 Estonian translation performed in Tartu, and an 1899 Croatian translation by V. Badalić, for a Zagreb production.

== Recordings ==
- 1910: Fatinitza selection] (musical excerpts in English): Luigi Ruffini, Maria Costa, Ruth Peter, soloists; Associated Light Opera Company; Eugene Plotnikoff, conductor; Arthur Pryor's Band. New York: Associated Music Publishers A-448 (matrix)/A-450 (matrix); 2 sound discs (20 min., 40 sec.); analogue, 33 1/3 rpm, mono; 16-inch distributed electrical transcription recordings; vertical recording; production level cataloguing; Library of Congress.
- 2006: Stephanie Houtzeel, mezzo-soprano (Wladimir/Fatinitza); Steven Scheschareg, baritone (General Kantschukoff); Bernhard Adler. bass-baritone (Izzet Pascha); Zora Antonic, soprano (Lydia); Christian Bauer, tenor (Julian von Goltz); Chor des Lehár Festivals Bad Ischl; Franz Lehár-Orchester; Vinzenz Praxmarer, conductor; dialogue version by Leonard C. and Sabine Prinsloo; programme notes and synopsis in English, German and French; cpo 777 202-2 (2 CDs).
