= Modern Symphony Orchestra =

The Modern Symphony Orchestra (sometimes called the Northern Polytechnic Modern Symphony Orchestra) was a London amateur orchestra that existed from 1931 to 1983.

== History ==
The Modern Symphony Orchestra was founded by Arthur Dennington, who led several smaller orchestral amateur ensembles in Northern London at that time and combined them in 1931 into a symphony orchestra. The name Modern Symphony Orchestra derived from the fact that the orchestra wanted to play "modern" music by contemporary and little known composers, and allow young soloists to perform with the orchestra.

The orchestra's first concert hall was Islington Town Hall. But owing to the poor acoustics there the orchestra moved to the Polytechnic Theatre in Holloway Road. In 1938 the Modern Symphony Orchestra was officially adopted by the Polytechnic Music Trades School and so became a part of the Northern Polytechnic Institute. Because of the terms of its charter the polytechnic was unable to subsidise the orchestra, but it provided rehearsal space and a theatre in which to perform.

In accordance with the name of the orchestra, contemporary, unknown or rarely heard compositions were performed regularly from the beginning, programmed alongside well known works. The quality of the orchestral playing and the openness to modern compositions allowed the orchestra to perform world and British premieres after only a few years of existence. The Oboe Concerto by Ruth Gipps, for example, received its world premiere by the Modern Symphony Orchestra on 13 June 1942 (with soloist Marion Brough) and the orchestra gave the British premiere of Stravinsky's 1947 revision of Petrushka. Other first performance in England included Roussel's Suite en fa, Tibor Harsanyi's La joie de vivre, Alban Berg's Seven Early Songs (with the 1928 orchestral accompaniment) and Frank Martin's Petite symphonie concertante.

In the 1940s the recognition and reputation of the orchestra rose; as a result Sir Adrian Boult visited the orchestra in 1949 and "expressed his appreciation at the enterprise and standard of playing shown and gave it as his opinion that the Modern Symphony Orchestra could claim to be one of the best amateur orchestras in the country." Boult later became the president of the orchestra and held the position for two decades. In 1952 the music critic of The Times praised the enterprising spirit of Dennington and his orchestra and expressed regret that many professional concerts in London failed to match it. In the post-war era the orchestra received a modest grant from public funds, enabling it to recruit professional players, particularly for complex modern scores.

Soloists who performed with the orchestra ranged from little-known artists to world-renowned performers. The 1949–50 concert season saw Frederick Grinke and Norman Walker, "both of whom offered their services as a tribute to the work of the orchestra." Other soloists in the following years included Jean Pougnet, Sophie Wyss, Florence Hooton, Dennis Brain, Tessa Robbins and Eileen Broster. Up-and-coming soloists were engaged: Joyce Hatto performed in 1955 with the orchestra at the beginning of her career, and Howard Shelley played in the 1971–72 season at the age of 21. For the Rare Recorded Editions label the orchestra recorded overtures by Auber and Cherubini.

Partly inspired by the Modern Symphony Orchestra's example, Ruth Gipps went on to found the One Rehearsal Orchestra in 1955, renamed in 1963 as the London Repertoire Orchestra and still running today.

== Notable performances ==
- Herbert Murrill: Concerto for cello and orchestra (first public performance on 09. March 1938 with Anthony Pini (cello))
- Harold Brazier: Theme and variations for orchestra (world premiere on 31. January 1942 with the composer conducting)
- Ruth Gipps: Oboe concerto (world premiere on 13. June 1942 with Marion Brough, oboe)
- Joyce Chapman: Nocturne for orchestra (world premiere on 16. October 1943)
- Ruth Gipps: Violin concerto (world premiere on 05.02.1944 with the composer's brother Ernest as soloist and conducted by Arthur Dennington
- Tibor Harsányi: La joie de vivre (English premiere on 19. February 1949)
- Lila Lalauni: Piano concerto No.1 (English premiere on 25. May 1949 with the composer as soloist in her first appearance in England)
- Frank Martin: Symphonie concertante (English premiere on 01. November 1952)
- Jurriaan Andriessen: Concertino for piano and orchestra (English premiere on 21. March 1953)
- Alan Bush: Piano concerto (first public performance on 15. May 1954)
- Kenneth Pakeman: Symphonic poem "Perelandra" (world premiere on 26. June 1954)
- Roberto Gerhard: Cancionero de Pedrell (English premiere on 23. October 1954 with Sophie Wyss (soprano))
- Hugo Godron: Concert-suite for piano and strings (English premiere on 23. October 1954 with Ria Groot (piano))
- Dimitri Shostakovich: Holiday Overture (English premiere on 25. May 1957)
- Alan Rawsthorne: Nursery Songs (first public performance in London on 26. April 1958 with Sophie Wyss (soprano))
- Stephen Dodgson: Guitar concerto (English premiere on 04. July 1959 with John Williams (guitar))
- Carl Nielsen: Seven Pieces from the incidental music to "Aladdin" (English premiere on 04. July 1959)
- Geoffrey Bush: Concertino for piano and orchestra (first public performance on 11. February 1961 with Eric Parkin (piano))
