= José Melchor Gomis =

Spanish composer (1791–1836)

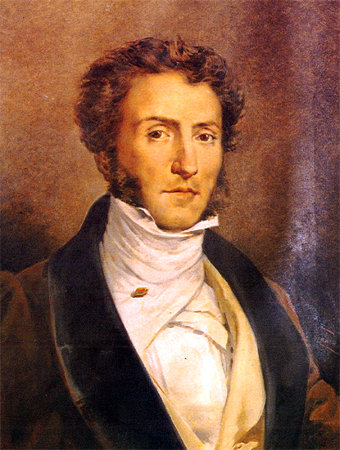
José Melchor Gomis (1791-1836) portrait by Gonzalo Salvá - original in the Conservatoire, Valencia

José Melchor Gomis y Colomer (6 January 1791 – 4 August 1836) was a Spanish Romantic composer.

== Career ==
He was born in Ontinyent, Vall d'Albaida, Valencia Province.

He served as the music director for an artillery regiment during the Napoleonic Wars. An early melodrame voiced by Gomis was performed in Valencia in 1817.

He composed the music for the Himno de Riego, named after the rebellious General Riego (1784-1823), which has since been used as the national anthem by various republican governments of Spain.

Gomis's political views led him to live in exile after the accession of Ferdinand VII in 1823, first in Paris and then in London. In both cities, he was a friend of fellow exile and composer Santiago Masarnau, whom he may have introduced to London musical life. In Paris, Gomis wrote a successful singing method, published in 1826 with dedications to Gioacchino Rossini and François-Adrien Boieldieu. In London, his choral work L'inverno was performed in 1827. In 1830, his opera Aben-Humeya was performed in Paris. Gomis's Paris operas Diable à Seville (1831) (staged with the support of Rossini) and Le revenant (1836) gained respectful reviews from Hector Berlioz. Le portefaix, the most successful of his operas, had a libretto by Eugène Scribe (originally offered to the composer Giacomo Meyerbeer).

Gomis was made a Chevalier of the Légion d'honneur by King Louis-Philippe. Gomis died in Paris in 1836 of tuberculosis, leaving a number of works unfinished, including the opera Le comte Julien, also to a libretto by Scribe (and eventually set in 1851 by Sigismond Thalberg as Florinda).

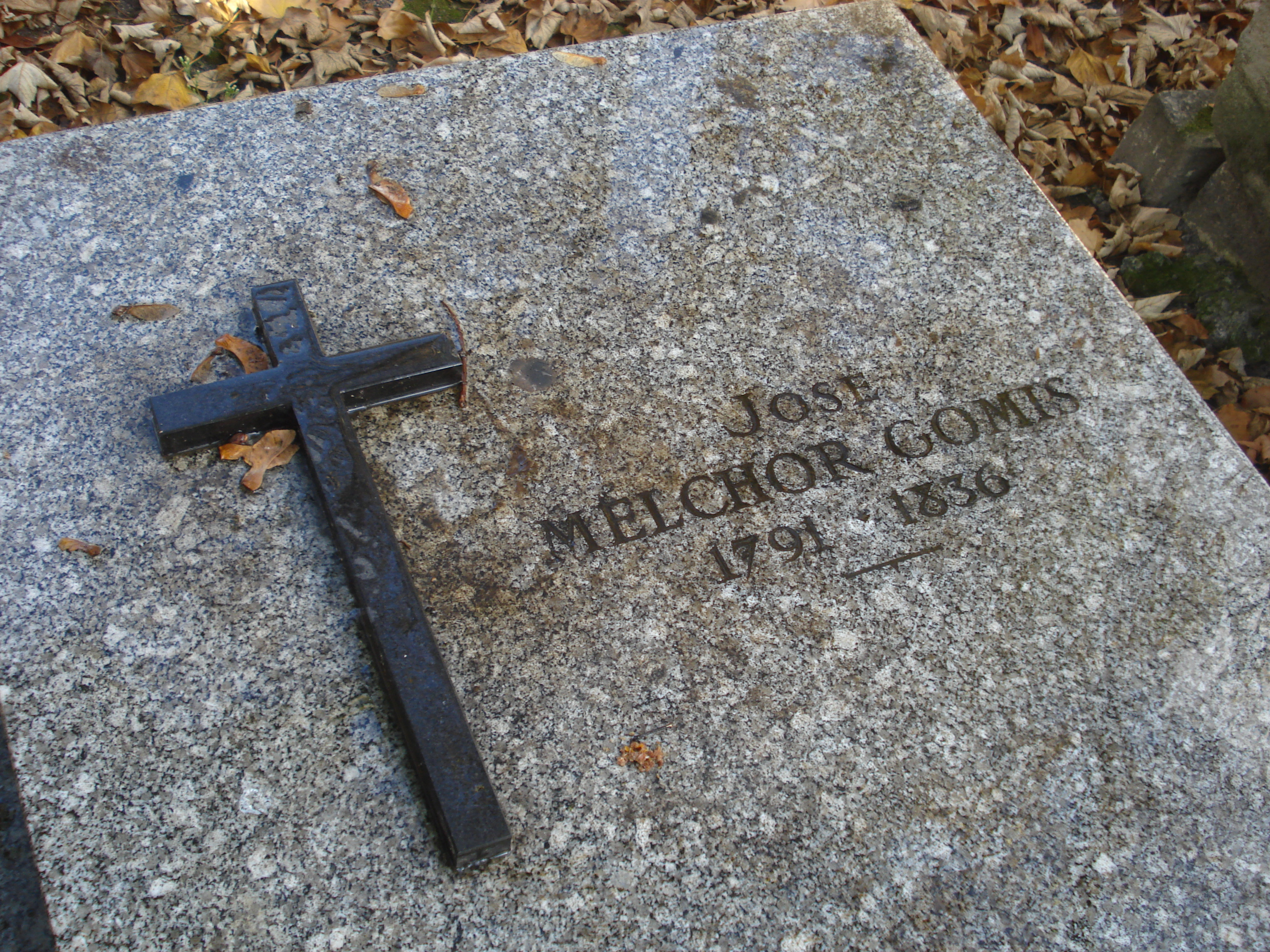
Montmartre Cemetery

== Bibliography ==
- Berlioz, Hector (ed. Katherine Kolb): Berlioz on Music: Selected Criticism, 1824–1837 Oxford: Oxford University Press, 2015); ISBN 9780199391950
- Dowling, John: "Gomis (y Colomer), José Melchor [Melchior]", in Grove Music Online (subscription required), accessed 23 August 2015.
- Johnson, Janet: "Rossini in Bologna and Paris during the Early 1830s: New Letters", in Revue de Musicologie, vol. 79 (1993) no. 1, pp. 67–83.
- Letellier, Robert: Meyerbeer’s Les Huguenots: An Evangel of Religion and Love (Cambridge: Cambridge Scholars Publishing, 2014); ISBN 9781443860840
