= Jean-Baptiste Chollet =

French singer and composer

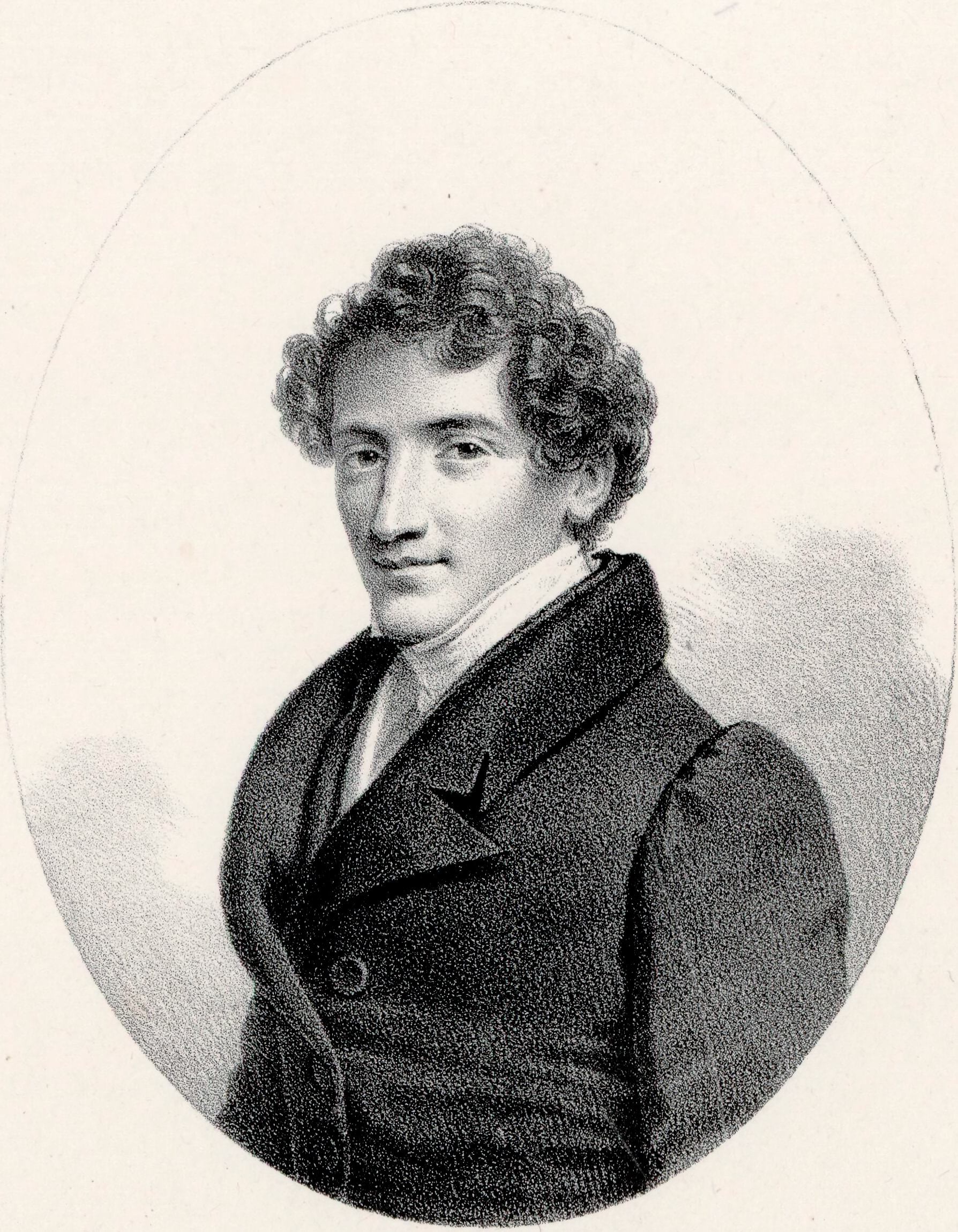
Jean-Baptiste Chollet

Jean-Baptiste Marie Chollet (20 May 1798 – 10 January 1892) was a French musician and operatic singer (baritone, later tenor). He also composed a few romances and nocturnes. He married the opera singer Geneviève-Aimé-Zoë Prévost and their daughter Caroline Chollet also became an opera singer under the stage name Mademoiselle Monrose.

== Life ==
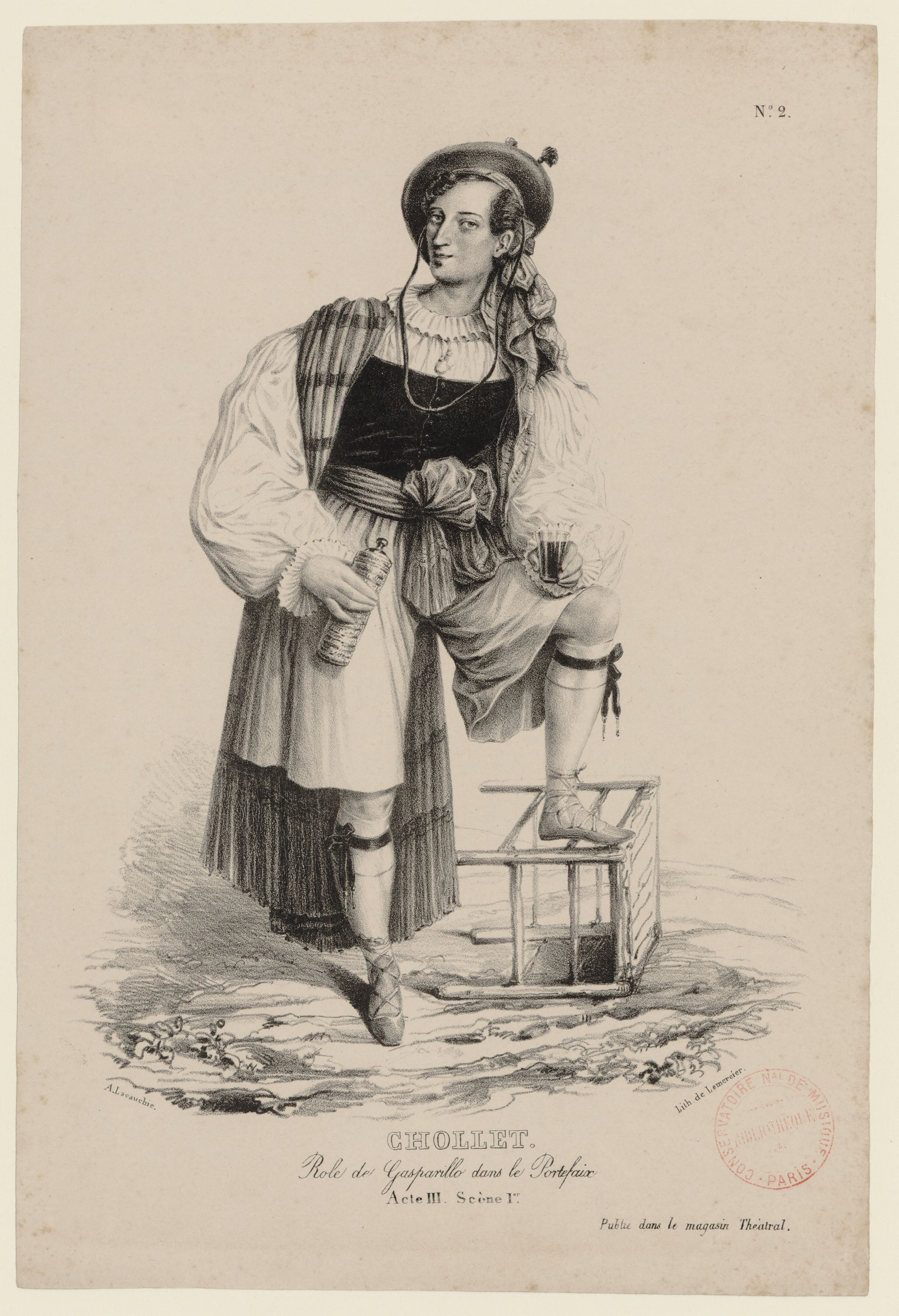
Chollet as Gasparillo, the protagonist of Le portefaix

Born in Paris, Chollet studied at the Conservatoire de Paris, where from the age of eight he studied solfège and violin. He graduated with a prize in solfège in 1814 and began singing as a high baritone in the church choir at Saint-Eustache, Paris, where his father was choirmaster. In 1815 he also became a chorus member at the Opéra de Paris, then at the Théâtre-Italien, and finally at the Théâtre Feydeau, where he remained for two years.

In 1818 he took the stage name Dôme-Chollet and appeared with a troupe of comic actors. In 1823 he was at the Théâtre du Havre, playing the roles of Martin, Lays and Soulié, which he continued to play during a one-year engagement at the Théâtre de La Monnaie in Brussels in 1825. He had a noted success in La Fête au village voisin. In 1826 he rejoined the Théâtre Feydeau and the following year became a partner in that company, but it went into decline from 1828 and it closed the following year.

In the meantime he had trained his voice to extend his repertoire to tenor roles such as one in Le Petit chaperon rouge by François-Adrien Boieldieu. Ferdinand Hérold wrote three tenor roles for him in Marie (1826), La Fiancée (1829) and Zampa (1831), the third of which was Chollet's favourite role. The title roles in Fra Diavolo by Daniel-François-Esprit Auber (1830) and Le Duc de Guise by George Onslow (1837) were also written for and premiered by Chollet, whilst he still occasionally sang baritone parts, such as Gasparillo in Le Portefaix by José Melchor Gomis (1835).

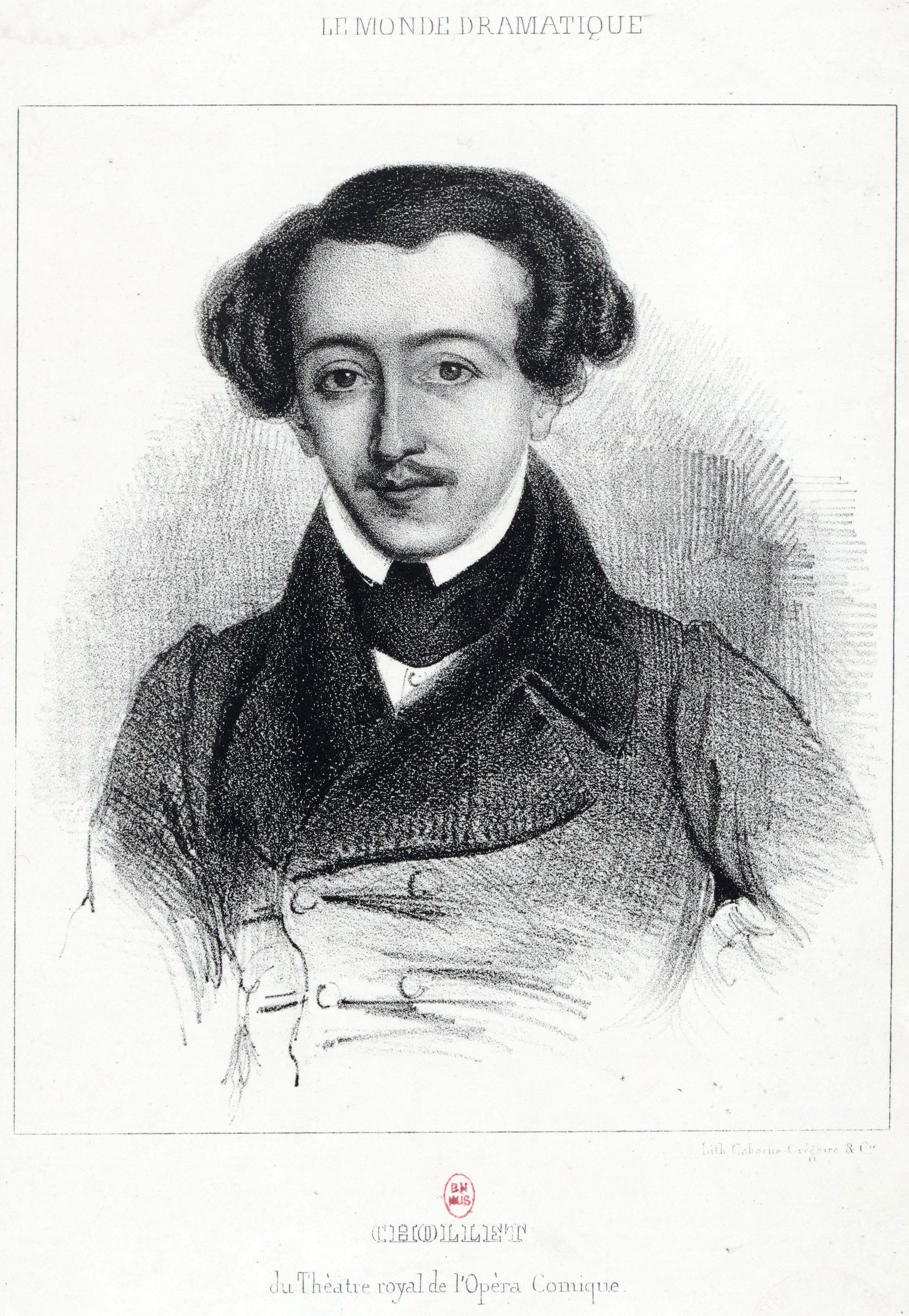
Chollet in 1840

The closure of the Théâtre Feydeau freed up Chollet and he chose to go out on tour again, spending a month in Belgium in April 1832, starting in Brussels (which he had already visited seven years earlier) and also singing first tenor in The Hague. After four years' absence he returned to Paris and joined the Opéra-Comique in 1835, where he had successes in Le Chalet by Adolphe Adam (1834), L'Éclair by Fromental Halévy (1835), Le Postillon de Lonjumeau by Adolphe Adam (1836) and Le Perruquier de la Régence by Ambroise Thomas (1838).

He returned to the Hague to direct its theatre and also visited London before finally returning to Paris, where in 1854 he was engaged to reprise the role of Chapelou in Le Postillon de Longjumeau at the new Théâtre-Lyrique – he had played the part in 1836. He debuted on 3 November, and the critic Gustave Héquet wrote that "Chollet has lost nothing of his talent from the old days. He still has his figure, his comic gestures, his delivery (clear and energetic) […] You can imagine how he was received in the role in which he always triumphed. It was like a family gathering, a return of the prodigal son". However, the revival was not successful enough for Chollet to continue his career. By then he was more appreciated abroad than in Paris, though some in the French capital still admired his "strong and sweet" timbre. However, he had never fully perfected his voice and had performed too much without a break, meaning that his singing was declining and rasping by the 1850s, showing up more of his defects, which were similar to those of his model Jean-Blaise Martin – abuse of fermatas, jerky roulades and strained voice. He thus retired after 1853 and disappears from the written record after that point.

== Sources ==
- Olivier Bara: Le Théâtre de l'Opéra-comique sous la restauration (Hildesheim: Georg Olms, 2001), p. 58.
- François-Joseph Fétis: Biographie universelle des musiciens et bibliographie générale de la musique, 2nd edition (Paris: Firmin Didot, 1866).
- Gustave & Louis Gustave Vapereau: Dictionnaire universel des contemporains (Paris: L. Hachette, 1858).
