= Lucie Manvel =

French actress

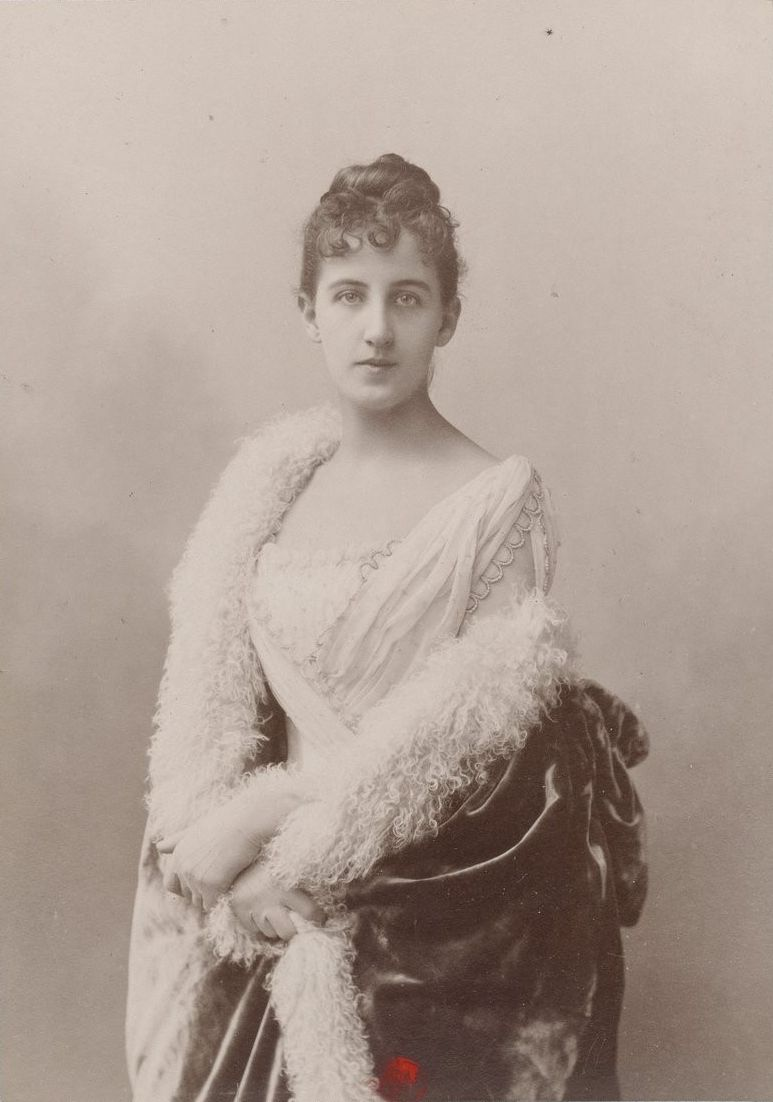
- Lucie Manvel, Atelier Nadar between 1875 and 1895
- Born: 1 May 1863; Marseille
- Died: 3 November 1943 (aged 80); 17th arrondissement of Paris
- Occupation: Stage actress

Lucie Manvel, née Lucie Jeanne Tanchon (1 May 1863 – 3 November 1943) was a French stage actress from Marseille.

== Short biography ==
A student at the Conservatoire of Paris with Sarah Bernhardt and Louis Monrose as teachers, she made her debut in the 1880s and played, among others, at the Théâtre du Vaudeville, the Ambigu-Comique, the Théâtre-Libre, the Théâtre de l'Odéon, the Théâtre des Variétés, the Théâtre du Cercle in Aix-les-Bains (La Vie facile, Mathias Sandorf, La Chance de Françoise, Myrtil et Mélicerte, Amoureuse, La Jeunesse des mousquetaires, La Vie à deux, Fedora, Jeunes Amours, La Flamboyante, Les Femmes savantes, Gogo, Les Dominos roses, Midi à quatorze heures, Le Nouveau Monde, La Course au baiser, Les Rantzau (in London), La Marchande de sourires, Le bonheur conjugal, Les Espérances, Chez l'avocat, Diplomate...)

She is buried at Montmartre Cemetery.
