= Geneviève-Aimé-Zoë Prévost =

French operatic soprano

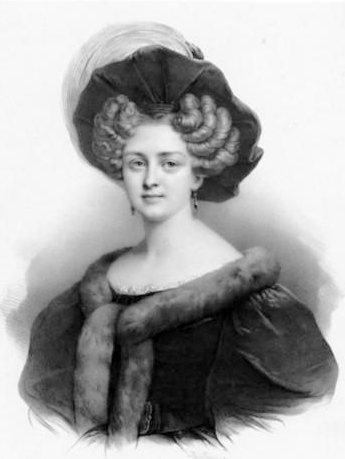
Zoé Prévost by Henri Grevedon

Geneviève-Aimé-Zoë Prévost (15 April 1802, Paris – 10 April 1861, Paris) was a French operatic soprano. She created leading roles in some of the most notable French opéras comiques of the first half of the nineteenth century, including "Fra Diavolo" by Daniel Auber and "Le postillon de Lonjumeau" by Adolphe Adam.

== Career ==
Geneviève-Aimé-Zoë Prévost, also known as Zoé Prévost, had a younger brother, Eugene, who was a composer and conductor. Zoé studied singing at the Paris Conservatoire and made her debut at the Opéra-Comique, Paris, in 1821. The Opéra-Comique at that time presented operas light in tone and with spoken dialogue between the musical numbers. She created leading roles in many opéras comiques including the title role in "La marquise de Brinvilliers", a collaborative work between nine composers, and in works by Fromental Halévy, Ambroise Thomas, and others. Considered one of the major stars of the lyric stage of her day, Prévost was esteemed for her unaffected stage presence, her charm of person and manner, her skills as a comic actress, and her excellent singing technique. She created the leading soprano roles in two opéras comiques still performed today, Zerlina in "Fra Diavolo" by Auber in 1830 and Madeleine in "Le postillon de Lonjumeau" by Adam in 1836, the most successful works of those two composers. In the latter work, as in others, she appeared opposite her husband, leading tenor Jean-Baptiste Chollet, by whom she had one daughter, Caroline, who also achieved success as a singer under the stage name Mademoiselle Monrose. Geneviève-Aimé-Zoë Prévost also appeared in other French and Belgian opera houses.
