= Arthur Dennington =

English conductor (1904–1988)

Arthur Dennington (12 August 1904 – 16 May 1988) was an English conductor and composer.

== Life and career ==
Arthur Dennington was born in London. He studied music at the Guildhall School of Music and Drama and the King's College London. After his studies he started to conduct several small orchestral groups in various institutes and schools in Northern London. In 1931 Dennington combined these different ensembles and formed the Modern Symphony Orchestra.

The name 'Modern' was agreed on to indicate that this was to be something new in the way of amateur orchestras, to attempt little known works and to encourage young wind players.

An amateur orchestra, the ensemble played music from wide spectrum of styles and musical periods, and the Musical Express stated that "in their best moments they give no indication of their amateur status". Dennington conducted the orchestra in performances at the Northern Polytechnic Theatre in London. For the next 44 years, until 1975, Dennington was the main conductor of the Modern Symphony Orchestra which took an important part in the orchestral landscape of London.

Many a composer, famous and unknown, has had cause for many years to be grateful to Arthur Dennington and his brave band for rehearsing and performing their works. (Burnett James, music critic)

During his years with the Modern Symphony Orchestra, Dennington conducted several world and English premieres of compositions, for example the world premieres of the horn and violin concertos by Ruth Gipps, or the English premieres of the Symphonie concertante by Frank Martin, the guitar concerto by Stephen Dodgson or the first public performance of the piano concerto by Alan Bush. In a 1949 review of the orchestra's world premiere of Ian Parrott's Scherzo for Orchestra, music critic Malcolm Rayment wrote:

If Arthur Dennington can make such an orchestra as this sound like a professional orchestra, one wonders what results he might achieve with a first-class orchestra.

In 1960 he conducted the orchestra in the world premiere of the opera Mary Barton by composer Arnold Cooke. He also conducted several operas at Islington Town Hall including Gian Carlo Menotti's The Consul (1963) and Giuseppe Verdi's La traviata (1969).

Dennington also recorded several LPs with little known orchestral repertoire for the Rare Recorded Editions label, for example four volumes of ouvertures by Daniel Auber.

In 1981 Dennington received an Honorary Fellowship of the Polytechnic Northern London University.

Besides his work as a conductor of the Modern Symphony Orchestra, Dennington was also a composer and created several chamber and orchestral works. He died in Walmer, Kent, aged 83.
