= Ruth Gipps =

English composer (1921–1999)

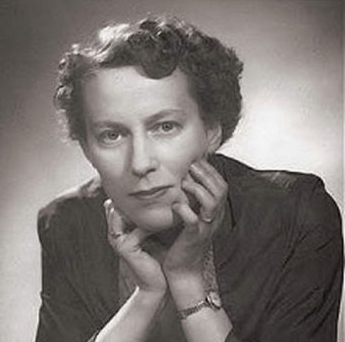
- Born: Ruth Dorothy Louisa Gipps; February 20, 1921; Bexhill-on-Sea, Sussex, England
- Died: February 23, 1999 (aged 78)
- Spouse: Robert Baker (married 1942)
- Children: Lance Baker (horn player)

Ruth Dorothy Louisa ("Wid") Gipps MBE (21 February 1921 – 23 February 1999) was an English composer, oboist, pianist, conductor and educator. She composed music in a wide range of genres, including five symphonies, seven concertos and many chamber and choral works. She founded both the London Repertoire Orchestra and the Chanticleer Orchestra and served as conductor and music director for the City of Birmingham Choir. Later in her life she served as chairwoman of the Composers' Guild of Great Britain.

She was appointed a Member of the Order of the British Empire (MBE) in the 1981 Birthday Honours for services to music.

== Early life and education ==
Gipps was born at 14 Parkhurst Road, Bexhill-on-Sea, England in 1921 to (Gerard Cardew) Bryan Gipps (1877–1956), a businessman, English teacher in Germany, and later an official at the Board of Trade who was a trained violinist from a military family, and Hélène Bettina (née Johner), a piano teacher from Basel, Switzerland. They married in 1907, having met at the Hoch Conservatory in Frankfurt, where Hélène had trained and went on to teach, and where Bryan had gone against his family's wishes to study the violin.

Ruth Gipps had two elder siblings, Ernest Bryan (1910–2001), a violinist, and Laura (1908–1962), also a musician. The Gipps family had Kent roots, descending from the eighteenth-century apothecary, hop merchant, banker, and politician George Gipps; Sir George Gipps, Governor of New South Wales from 1838 to 1846, was a relative. At his marriage, Bryan Gipps had started a small business to allow his wife to focus on her music; after a few years, the business failed, and they moved to Germany, where he taught English. When they moved to Bexhill-on-Sea at the outbreak of the First World War in 1914, the family was in the then unusual position of a middle-class household's mother being the main provider, which along with Hélène's idiosyncrasies attracted some attention. The family home was the Bexhill School of Music, of which Hélène was principal. Eventually becoming an official at the Board of Trade, her father was also the senior heir, via his mother, Louisa Goulburn Thomas, to the Carmarthenshire and Kent property of Richard Thomas, of Hollingbourne, near Maidstone, Kent, and of Cystanog, High Sheriff of Carmarthenshire in 1788.

Ruth, a child prodigy, began studying piano with her mother from a very early age. Her first public performance was at Grotrian Hall in London at the age of four. She performed one of her first compositions at the age of eight in Brighton in 1929. A few years later, she won a concerto competition, performing the first movement of a Haydn with the Hastings Municipal Orchestra. She continued playing regularly throughout her teen years.

In 1937, at the age of 16, she entered the Royal College of Music,. While there, she studied oboe with Léon Goossens, piano with Arthur Alexander and composition with Gordon Jacob, and later with Ralph Vaughan Williams. Several of her works were first performed there, including her symphonic tone poem Knight in Armour, op. 8, which is based on Rembrandt's painting 'Young Warrior'. As a student, Ruth won much acclaim and prizes for her pieces, including her piano quartet Brocade (1941), op. 17. Her string quartet Sabrina (1940) won a Cobbett prize. It was premiered in 1946 by the Society for Women Musicians.

Continuing her studies at Durham University, she passed her final exams by writing a Quintet for oboe, clarinet, and string trio. She met her future husband, clarinetist Robert Baker, a musician in the premiere performance of her Quintet in 1941 at Wigmore Hall. At age 26, she became the youngest British woman to receive a doctorate in music, for her choral work The Cat.

== Professional career ==
Ruth Gipps was an accomplished well-rounded musician, as a soloist on both oboe and piano as well as a prolific composer. But her early career was affected by discrimination, and because of this opposition, she is thought to have developed a tough personality that many found off-putting, and a fierce determination to prove herself through her work. Her repertoire included works such as Arthur Bliss' Piano Concerto and Constant Lambert's The Rio Grande. When she was 33 a shoulder injury ended her performance career, and she decided to focus her energies on conducting and composition. Gipps claimed to know from a young age that her main interest lay in composing, stating,

I had of course known all along that playing the piano was my job; the first concert merely confirmed it. But I also knew without a shadow of a doubt, although I had not yet written anything, that I was a composer. Not that I wanted to be a composer – that I was one.

An early success came when Sir Henry Wood conducted her tone poem Knight in Armour at the Last Night of the Proms in 1942. Gipps' music is marked by a skilful use of instrumental colour and often shows the influence of Vaughan Williams, rejecting the trends in avant-garde modern music such as serialism and twelve-tone music. She considered her orchestral works, her five symphonies in particular, as her greatest works. She also produced two substantial piano concertos. After the war Gipps turned her attention to chamber music, and in 1956 she won the Cobbett Prize of the Society of Women Musicians for her Clarinet Sonata, Op. 45. In March 1945, she performed Alexander Glazunov's Piano Concerto No. 1 with the City of Birmingham Orchestra as a piano soloist while also, in the same program, performing in her own Symphony No. 1 on cor anglais under the baton of George Weldon.

She founded the One Rehearsal Orchestra, later known as the London Repertoire Orchestra in 1955. This provided an opportunity for young students and amateurs to become exposed to a wide range of music. In 1957, she conducted the Pro Arte Orchestra. She later founded the Chanticleer Orchestra in 1961, a professional ensemble which included a work by a living composer in each of its programs, often a premiere performance. Among these was the first London performance in September 1972 of the Cello Concerto by Sir Arthur Bliss in which the cellist Julian Lloyd Webber made his professional debut at the Queen Elizabeth Hall. Malcolm Arnold wrote his Variations on a Theme of Ruth Gipps specifically for this orchestra. In forming her own orchestras, she was able to build a thriving conducting career and circumvent the neglect of her own music by the BBC.

Later she would take faculty posts at Trinity College London (1959 to 1966), the Royal College of Music (1967 to 1977), and then Kingston Polytechnic at Gypsy Hill. In 1967 she was appointed chairwoman of the Composers' Guild of Great Britain.

== Retirement and death ==
In London, her address was 20 Heathcote Road, St Margaret's, Twickenham. On her retirement, Gipps returned to Sussex, living at Tickerage Castle near Framfield until her death in 1999, aged 78, after suffering the effects of cancer and a stroke. Her son Lance Baker (1947-2026) was a professional horn player, orchestrator and brass teacher.

== Music ==
Stylistically, Gipps was a Romantic both in the musical sense and in her choice of extra-musical inspiration (for example the tone poem Knight in Armour). Although her music is not typically pastoral from a programmatic perspective, Gipps was heavily indebted to the English pastoralist school of the early 20th century, particularly her erstwhile teacher Vaughan Williams, but other figures, including Arthur Bliss (to whom she dedicated the Fourth Symphony), her contemporary Malcolm Arnold, and the conductor George Weldon were also influential. Her conservative, tonal style placed her at odds with contemporary trends in music such as serialism, of which she was highly critical. After her early success with Knight in Armour in 1942, her music was not featured again in the Proms nor broadcast on BBC Radio 3 in her lifetime.

=== Orchestra ===
- Symphonies
  - Symphony No. 1 in F minor, Op. 22 (1942)
  - Symphony No. 2 (in One Movement), Op. 30 (1945)
  - Symphony No. 3, Op. 57 (1965)
  - Symphony No. 4, Op. 61 (1972)
  - Symphony No. 5, Op. 64 (1982)
- Variations on Byrd's "Non nobis", for small orchestra, Op. 7 (1942)
- Knight in Armour, tone poem, Op. 8 (1942)
- Sea Nymph, ballet for small orchestra (or for two pianos), Op. 14 (1941 ?)
- Death on a Pale Horse, tone poem, Op. 25 (1943)
- Chanticleer Overture, Op. 28 (1944)
- The Chinese Cabinet Suite for orchestra, Op. 29 (1945)
- Mahomet and the Cat, Op. 32 (1947)
- Song for Orchestra, Op. 33 (1948)
- Cringlemire Garden, an impression for string orchestra, Op. 39 (1952)
- Coronation Procession for orchestra, Op. 41 (1953)
- Pageant Overture The Rainbow, Op. 44 (1954)
- Ambarvalia for small orchestra, Op. 70 (1988)

=== Concertante ===
- Piano Concerto in G minor, Op. 34 (1948)
- Violin Concerto in B-flat major, Op. 24 (1943)
- Jane Grey, Fantasy for Viola and String Orchestra (or piano), Op. 15 (1940)
- Introduction and Carol: The Ox and the Ass for Double Bass and Chamber Orchestra, Op. 71 (1996)
- Oboe Concerto in D minor, Op. 20 (1941)
- Threnody for English Horn, Strings and Harp (1990)
- Clarinet Concerto, Op. 9 (1940)
- Leviathan for Contra-Bassoon and Chamber Orchestra, Op. 59 (1969, for Valentine Kennedy)
- Horn Concerto, Op. 58 (1968)
- Double Concerto for Violin, Viola and Small Orchestra, Op. 49 (1957)

=== Chamber music ===
- Chamois for 2 Violins and Piano, Op. 3c (1939)
- Trio for Oboe, Clarinet and Piano, Op. 10 (1940)
- Suite for 2 Violins, Op. 12d (1940)
- Elephant God for Clarinet and Percussion, Op. 12e (1940)
- Sabrina, String Quartet in one movement, Op. 13 (1940)
- Quintet for Oboe, Clarinet, Violin, Viola and Cello, Op. 16 (1941)
- Piano Quartet Brocade, Op. 17 (1941)
- Rhapsody in E♭ for Clarinet Quintet, Op. 23 (1942)
- Scherzo: The Three Billy Goats Gruff for Oboe, Horn, and Bassoon, Op. 27b (1943)
- String Quartet, Op. 47 (1956)
- Seascape for 10 Winds, Op. 53 (1958)
- A Tarradiddle for 2 Horns, Op. 54 (1959)
- Wind Octet for 2 Oboes, 2 Clarinets, 2 Bassoons and 2 Horns, Op. 65 (1983)
- Sinfonietta for 10 Winds and Percussion, Op. 73 (1989)
- The Pony Cart for Flute, Horn and Piano, Op. 75 (1990)
- A Wealden Suite, Quartet for E♭, B♭, A and Bass Clarinets, Op. 76 (1991)
- Pan and Apollo for 2 Oboes, English Horn and Harp, Op. 78 (1992)

=== Instrumental ===
- Strings
  - Rhapsody for Violin and Piano, Op. 27a (1943)
  - Violin Sonata, Op. 42 (1954)
  - Evocation for Violin and Piano, Op. 48 (1956)
  - Lyric Fantasy for Viola and Piano, Op. 46 (1955)
  - Scherzo and Adagio for Cello Solo, Op. 68 (1987)
  - Cello Sonata, Op. 63 (1978)
  - Double-Bass Sonata, Op. 81 (1986)
- Woodwinds
  - Pixie Caravan for Flute and Piano (1939)
  - Rowan for Flute and Piano (1940)
  - The Saint Francis Window for Alto Flute and Piano, Op. 67 (1986)
  - Cool Running Water for Bass Flute and Piano, Op. 77 (1991)
  - Kensington Garden Suite for Oboe and Piano, Op. 2 (1938)
  - Sea-Shore Suite for Oboe and Piano, Op. 3b (1939)
  - Oboe Sonata No. 1 in G minor, Op. 5 (1939)
  - The Piper of Dreams for Oboe Solo, Op. 12b (1940)
  - Oboe Sonata No. 2, Op. 66 (1985)
  - Sea-Weed Song for English Horn and Piano, Op. 12c (1940)
  - Threnody for English Horn and Piano (or Organ), Op. 74 (1990)
  - The Kelpie Of Corrievreckan for Clarinet and Piano, Op. 5b (1939)
  - Clarinet Sonata, Op. 45 (1955)
  - Prelude for Bass Clarinet Solo (or B♭ Clarinet), Op. 51 (1958)
  - Honey-Coloured Cow for bassoon and piano, Op. 3d (1938)
- Brass
  - The Riders of Rohan for Trombone and Piano (1987)
  - Horn Sonatina, Op. 56 (1960)
  - Triton for Horn and Piano, Op. 60 (1970)
  - Trombone (or Horn) Sonata, Op. 80 (1995)

=== Piano ===
- The Fairy Shoemaker (1929)
- Sea Nymph, ballet for small orchestra (or for two pianos), Op. 14 (1941 ?)
- Conversation for 2 Pianos, Op. 36 (1950)
- Theme and Variations, Op. 57a (1965) (transcription of Symphony No. 3, third movement)
- Opalescence, Op. 72 (1989)

=== Choral ===
- Mazeppa's Ride for Female Chorus and Orchestra, Op. 1 (1937)
- The Cat, Cantata for Alto, Baritone, Double Mixed Chorus and Orchestra, Op. 32 (1947)
- Goblin Market for 2 Sopranos, Female Chorus and String Orchestra (or Piano), Op. 40 (1953)
- An Easter Carol for Soprano, Mixed Chorus and Piano or Organ, Op. 52 (1958)
- Magnificat and Nunc dimittis for Mixed Chorus and Organ, Op. 55 (1959)
- Gloria in excelsis for Unison Chorus and Organ, Op. 62 (1977)
- A Service for Holy Communion for Mixed Chorus and Organ, Op. 62a (1974)

=== Vocal ===
- Four Baritone Songs for Baritone and Piano, Op. 4b (1939)
- Heaven for High Voice and Piano (1939)
- Four Songs of Youth for Tenor and Piano (1940)
- Two Songs for Soprano and Piano, Op. 11 (1940)
- Rhapsody for Wordless Soprano and Small Orchestra, Op. 18 (1941)
- Ducks for Soprano, Flute, Cello and Piano, Op. 19 (1941)
- The Song of the Narcissus for Soprano and Piano, Op. 37 (1951)
- Three Incantations for Soprano and Harp, Op. 50 (1957)
- The Lady of the Lambs for Soprano and Wind Quintet, Op. 79 (1992)

== Discography ==
Recordings of the music of Ruth Gipps include:

- Cello Sonata, Theme & Variations for piano, Opalescence, Double Bass Sonata. Joseph Spooner (cello), David Heyes (double bass), Duncan Honeybourne (piano). Prima Facie (2021)
- Clarinet Sonata, Quintet for Oboe, Clarinet and String Trio. Peter Cigleris (clarinet), Gareth Hulse (oboe), Duncan Honeybourne (piano), Tippett Quartet. SOMM (2021)
- Clarinet Concerto. Robert Plane, BBC Scottish Symphony Orchestra, cond. Martyn Brabbins (2020)
- Cool Running Water. Robert Plane (clarinet), Benjamin Frith (piano), MPR 118 (2025)
- Cringlemire Garden. Southwest German Chamber Orchestra, Douglas Bostock, CPO CX 5457 (2021) (with collection of other British string works)
- Horn Concerto. David Pyatt (horn), London Philharmonic Orchestra conducted by Nicholas Braithwaite, Lyrita (2007)
- Jane Grey. Alex Mitchell (viola), Manchester Camerata. Resonance Classics RES10390 (2026)
- Oboe Sonatas Nos. 1 and 2. Juliana Koch (oboe), Michael McHale (piano). On Piper of Dreams, Chandos 20290 (2024)
- Octet for Wind (2nd movement), Pan and Apollo. Members of BBC National Orchestra of Wales, broadcast 12/3/2021
- Piano Concerto, Theme and Variations for piano, Opalescence. Angela Brownridge (piano), Malta Philharmonic Orchestra conducted by Michael Laus, Cameo Classics (2014)
- Piano Concerto, Ambarvalia. Royal Liverpool Philharmonic Orchestra conducted by Charles Peebles, soloist Murray McLachlan (2019).
- Rhapsody for clarinet and string quartet, op. 42. Mark van de Wiel (clarinet) and soloists of the Philharmonia, Signum Classics SIGCD1008 (2026)
- Seascape, Sinfonietta. Erie County Chamber Winds conducted by Rick Fleming. Mark Records (2013)
- Symphony No. 1, Coronation Procession, Ambarvalia, Horn Concerto, Cringlemire Garden. Martin Owen (horn), BBC Philharmonic conducted by Rumon Gamba. Chandos (2025)
- Symphony No 2. Munich Symphony Orchestra, conducted by Douglas Bostock, ClassicO, (1999)
- Symphony No 2, Symphony No 4, Knight in Armour, Song for Orchestra. BBC National Orchestra of Wales, conducted by Rumon Gamba, Chandos (2018)
- Symphony No 3, Oboe Concerto, Chanticleer, Death on the Pale Horse. BBC National Orchestra of Wales, conducted by Rumon Gamba, Chandos (2022)
- Symphony No 3. BBC Scottish Symphony Orchestra conducted by Ruth Gipps, broadcast 29 October 1969
- Symphony No 3. BBC Philharmonic Orchestra, conducted by Rumon Gamba, broadcast 9 October 2020
- Symphony No 5, Violin Concerto, Leviathan. BBC Philharmonic/Rumon Gamba. Chandos CHAN20319 (2025)
- Symphony No 5. London Repertoire Orchestra, conducted by Ruth Gipps, recording of a performance given in 1983.
- Violin Sonata, Rhapsody for violin and piano, Evocation. Patrick Wastnage (violin), Elizabeth Dunn (piano).Guild GMCD7827 (2022)
