= Édouard Mangin =

French conductor and composer

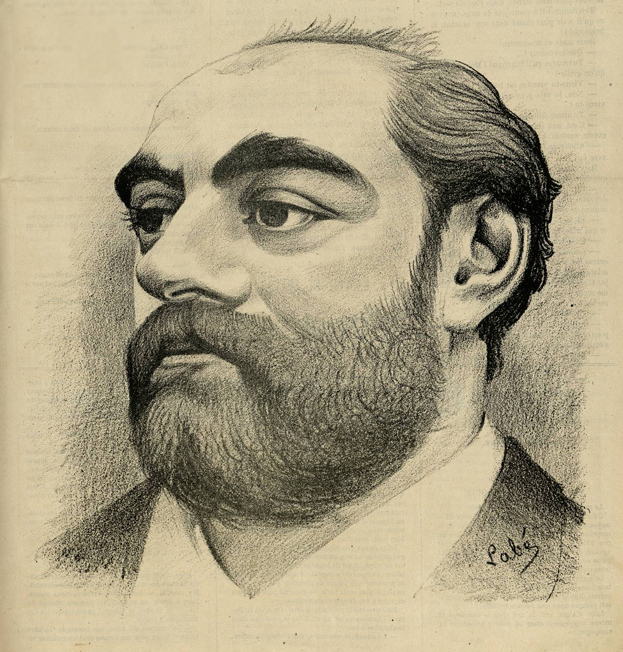
Édouard Mangin (from 1876 newspaper)

Eugène Édouard Mangin-Bocquet (7 December 1837 – 25 May 1907) was a French musician, founder and the first director of the Lyon Conservatory.

== Career ==
Mangin was born in Paris. Between 1850 and 1858, Mangin won 3 first prizes at the Conservatoire de Paris. He also published some light pieces and opera arrangements for piano, mainly with the music publisher Girod.

In 1864, he became conductor of the Théâtre Lyrique in Paris, which was burnt during the government of the Commune. In October 1871, Mangin moved to Lyon as conductor of the orchestra of the Grand Théâtre in the city (1871–73). Some of his best players (including the violinists Lévy and Giannini, the violist Gondouin and the horn-player Brémont) went there with him. On 2 May 1872, the Lyon École de musique was established, and on 1 July Mangin became its inaugural director. He was dismissed in 1876.

In his later years he was conductor of Opéra de Paris (1893–1906) and was also appointed professor at the Conservatoire de Paris. In 1895, he became a Chevalier of the Légion d'honneur.

Mangin died in the 8th arrondissement of Paris.
