= Hulda (opera) =

- Opera by César Franck
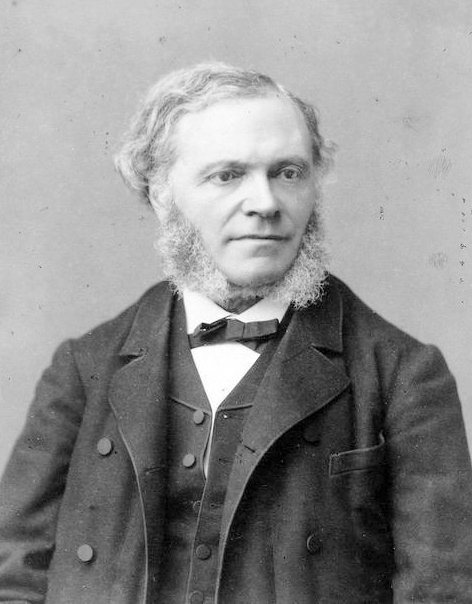
- The composer
- Language: French
- Based on: Lame Hulda (1858) by Bjørnstjerne Bjørnson
- Premiere: 16 October 1894 (incomplete); Monte Carlo

Hulda is an opera by César Franck to a French libretto by Charles Grandmougin. It is set in 11th-century Norway, and is based on the play Lame Hulda (1858) by Norwegian writer Bjørnstjerne Bjørnson. The complete opera contains a prologue, three acts and an epilogue, albeit the world premier recording by Naxos has five acts. It was composed between 1879 and 1885.

== Performance history ==
Hulda was first was Franck's first opera to be performed, in an incomplete version, in Monte Carlo, Monaco, on 8 March 1894. followed by performances in The Hague in March 1895 and Toulouse in April 1895.

The influence of Richard Wagner is clear, both in the writing for brass and also in the love duets which are reminiscent of Tristan und Isolde. Franck's writing shows his seriousness of expression and characteristic chromatic harmony.

The third act was performed at the Concerts Colonne with Demellier and Cazeneuve on 16 October 1904 to mark the unveiling of a monument to the composer.

The first complete performance of the opera was by Reading University Opera on 28 February 1978, and it was staged at the Bloomsbury Theatre, London, on 15 March 1994, by University College Opera with Julian Gavin as Eiolf. This 1994 UCL Opera production restored the Marche Royale at the start of act 4, not included in any of the earlier productions.

The first two acts were performed with Trondheim Symphony Orchestra on 22 and 23 October 2010 in Molde, Norway.

The first complete performance of the original version of the opera sung in French was on the 16 February 2019 in Freiburg im Breisgau. It was released on the Naxos label in October 2021 with conductor Fabrice Bollon.

A revival concert-performance of the complete opera took place at the Royal Opera Hall of Wallonia in Liège, Belgium, on 15 May 2022. The Royal Philharmonic Orchestra of Liège was conducted by Gergely Madaras. The performers included Jennifer Holloway (Hulda), Véronique Gens (Gudrun), Judith van Wanroij (Swanhilde), Marie Karall (Hulda’s mother), Marie Gautrot (Halgerde), Ludivine Gombert (Thordis), Edgaras Montvidas (Eiolf), Matthieu Lécroart (Gudleik), Christian Helmer (Eynar), Guilhem Worms (Aslak), François Rougier (Gunnard), Sébastien Droy (Thrond), Artavazd Sargsyan (Eyrick), Matthieu Toulouse (Arne and a Herald), and the Chamber Choir of Namur.

The manuscript full score is held at the Bibliothèque nationale in Paris.

== Roles ==
Roles, voice types, premiere cast
Role	Voice type	Premiere cast 8 March 1894 Conductor: Léon Jehin
Hulda Hustawick	mezzo-soprano	Blanche Deschamps-Jéhin
Hulda’s mother	mezzo-soprano	Mounier
Aslak	bass	Joël Maurice Fabre
Gudrun, Aslak's wife	mezzo-soprano	Rissler
Gudleik, Aslak's eldest son	baritone	Paul Lhérie
Halgerde, Aslak's sister	soprano	Marcelle Dartoy
Arne, another son of Aslak	bass	
Thrond, younger son of Aslak	baritone	
Eyric, younger son of Aslak	tenor	Desgoria
Eynar, younger son of Aslak	tenor	Signa
Gunnard, Halgerde's son	tenor	Borie
Thordis, Gunnard's fiancée	soprano	
Eiolf, a gentleman	tenor	Albert Saléza
Swanhilde, rejected by Eiolf	soprano	Emma d'Alba
Nobles, peasants, warriors

== Synopsis ==
The story tells how Hulda seeks revenge on Aslak and his clan, who killed her family. The subject depicts a young woman as a victim, her faith in nature, her destiny, and women's suffering at the hands of men.

Prologue
After a prelude depicting the wind and sea, Hulda and her mother, singing a prayer duet, await the return of their menfolk from hunting. After an off-stage chorus of fishermen (accompanied by four saxophones), the Aslak men celebrate their murder of the Hustawicks, and Gudleik declares his lust for in Hulda, who responds with a curse (an oath motif), and vows revenge on his family. A chorus of victory for the Aslaks contains a three chord death motif which will recur when they themselves meet their deaths.

Act 1
Two years on, Hulda is to be married to Gudleik, and Gunnard is to marry Thordis. After a haunting A minor women's chorus and the brighter entrance of Swanhilde, Gudleik and his brothers are heard arguing over Hulda, until Gudrun forces them – in an aria with typically Franckian chromatic harmonies – to show more respect. Hulda has seen Eiolf, an emissary of the Norwegian king (who has rejected Swanhilde) and is infatuated by him. The wedding party assembles but soon Eiolf arrives and during a traditional show of manliness and courage by the men, Eiolf and Gudleik fight, resulting in the death of Gudleik in a Verdian-style finale.

Act 2
After a pastoral prelude, Aslak and Gudrun are seen grieving for Gudleik. At evening time Hulda in a wide-ranging soliloquy, awaits Eiolf, who she sees as a god-sent avenger who has released her from the Aslaks and the duty of her vengeance. After a passionate duet in which Hulda makes Eiolf promise to return with her to her homeland, he leaves her for the night and Arne, one of Aslak's sons enters and declares his love for Hulda. Old Aslak sees a man making love to Hulda, and kills him – only discovering after that he has killed his own son, and Hulda's curse has claimed a second victim.

Act 3
After the long Arctic winter, celebrations and selection of a May queen are set to a waltz-like movement. Swanhilde is still upset by her betrayal by Eiolf, but her friend Thordis promises to re-unite them. When Eiolf enters Swanhilde is cold and cannot conceal her jealousy of Hulda; Eiolf embraces her. Hulda, close at hand, sees his betrayal of her, and she gets the remaining Aslak brothers to help murder Eiolf. They agree to meet the following day. The celebrations of spring resume, in contrast to Hulda's despair.

Epilogue
After an entr'acte based on the stark music from the beginning of the opera, there follows an evening chorus. The passion of Swanhilde and Eiolf's reconciliation contrasts sharply with Hulda's pain. She prepares for revenge: the Aslaks return and Eiolf is struck down. When the brothers then turn on her, she welcomes death and when the men turn away in fear, Hulda throws herself in the fjord.

== Recordings ==
- NAXOS World Premier Recording (Opera in Five Acts) - Cat: 8.660480-82 (UHD) - Fabrice Bollon, Conductor; Opern und Extrachor des Theater Freiburg, Philharmonisches Orchester Freiburg. Meagan Miller, Joshua Kohl, Irina Jae Eun Park, Anja Jung, Jin Seok Lee; [February 2019].
- PALAZETTO BRU ZANE - Cat: BZ 1052 (UHD) - Gergely Maderas, Conductor; Chœur de Chambre de Namur, Orchestre Philharmonique de Liège au Théâre de Monte-Carlo; Jennifer Holloway, Judith van Wanroij, François Rougier, Véronique Gens; [May 17-20, 2022}

== See also ==
- Ghiselle
