= Philémon et Baucis =

Opera in three acts by Charles Gounod

- Opera by Charles Gounod
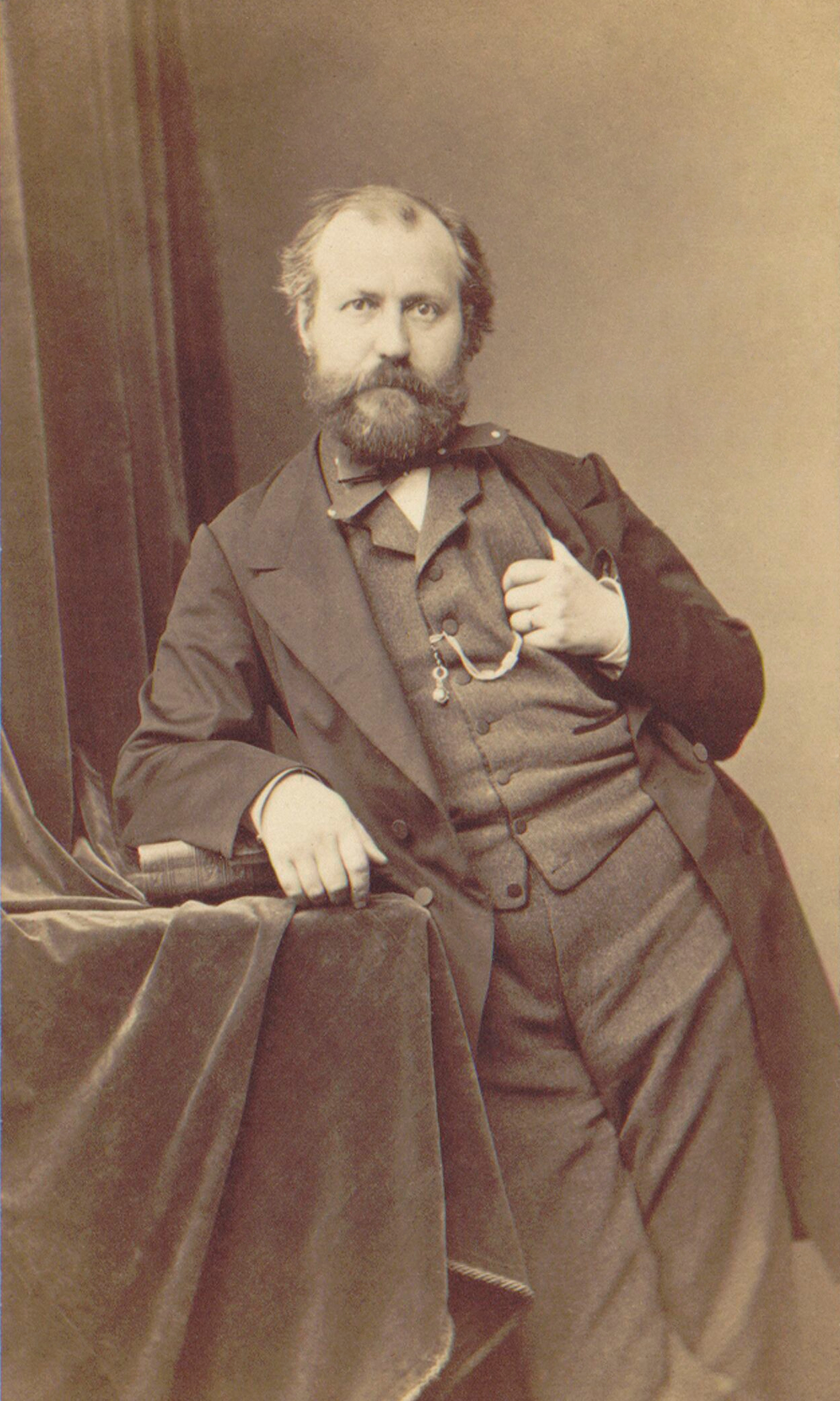
- Gounod in 1860
- Librettist: Jules Barbier; Michel Carré
- Language: French
- Based on: Tale of Baucis and Philemon
- Premiere: 18 February 1860; Théâtre Lyrique, Paris

Philémon et Baucis (Philemon and Baucis) is an opera in three acts by Charles Gounod with a libretto by Jules Barbier and Michel Carré. The opera is based on the tale of Baucis and Philemon as told by La Fontaine (derived in turn from Ovid's Metamorphoses Book VIII). The piece was intended to capitalize on the vogue for mythological comedy started by Offenbach's Orpheus in the Underworld, but Philémon et Baucis is less satirically biting and more sentimental.

Originally intended as a two-act piece for the music festival at Baden-Baden, it was instead first performed at the Théâtre Lyrique, Paris, on 18 February 1860 because of the political situation in 1859. The new version added a middle act with chorus depicting Jupiter's destruction of the impious neighbours (by fire instead of flood).

== Roles ==
Role	Voice type	Premiere Cast, 3 Act version, 18 February 1860 (Conductor: Adolphe Deloffre)	Revised 2 Act version, 16 May 1876 (Conductor: Charles Constantin)
Philémon	tenor	Froment	Charles-Auguste Nicot
Baucis	soprano	Marie Caroline Miolan-Carvalho	Marguérite Chapuy
Jupiter	bass	Charles-Amable Battaille	Jacques Bouhy
Vulcan	bass	Mathieu Emile Balanqué	Alfred-Auguste Giraudet
Bacchante	soprano	Marie Sax	

== Synopsis ==
=== Act 1 ===
Jupiter comes to Philémon's hut, accompanied by Vulcain, to seek refuge from a storm which the god himself has caused. He had come to earth to verify Mercury's tale of the people's badness, and finding this only too true, being received discourteously by people around, he is glad to meet with a kindly welcome at Philémon's door. This worthy old man lives in poverty but contentedly with his wife Baucis, with whom he has been married for sixty years. Jupiter, seeing at once that the old couple form an exception to the evil rule, resolves to spare them, and to punish only the bad people. The gods partake of the kind people's simple meal, and Jupiter, changing the milk into wine, is recognized by Baucis, who is much struck by this discovery. But Jupiter reassures her and promises to grant her only wish, which is to be young again with her husband, and to live the same life. The god sends them to sleep. There follows an intermezzo.

Phrygians are resting after a festival, bacchants rush in and wild orgies begin afresh. The divine is mocked and pleasure praised as the only god. Vulcain comes, sent by Jupiter to warn them, but they only laugh at him, mocking Olympus and the gods. Jupiter himself appears to punish the sinners, and a tempest arises, sending everything to rack and ruin.

=== Act 2 ===
Philémon's hut is now a palace; he awakes to find himself and his wife young again. Jupiter, seeing Baucis' beauty, orders Vulcain to keep Philémon away while he courts her. Baucis, though determined to remain faithful to Philémon, nevertheless is flattered at the god's attentions, and dares not refuse him a kiss. Philémon witnesses it, and violently reproaches her and his guest; though Baucis suggests who the latter is, the husband does not feel inclined to share his wife's love, even with a god. The first quarrel takes place between the couple, and Vulcain hearing it, consoles himself with the reflection that he is not the only one to whom a fickle wife causes sorrow. Philémon bitterly curses Jupiter's gift; he wishes to go back to how he was, with peace of mind. Throwing down Jupiter's statue, he leaves his wife to the god. Baucis, replacing the image, which happily is made of bronze, repents her behavior towards her husband. Jupiter finds her weeping and praying that the gods may turn their wrath upon herself alone. The god promises to pardon both, if she is willing to listen to his love. She agrees to the bargain on the condition that Jupiter shall grant her a favour. He consents, and she entreats him to make her old again. Philémon, listening behind the door, rushes forward to embrace the true wife and joins his entreaties to hers. Jupiter, seeing himself caught, would fain be angry, but their love conquers his wrath. He does not recall his gift, but giving them his blessing, promises never more to cross their happiness.
