= Charles Grandmougin =

French poet and playwright

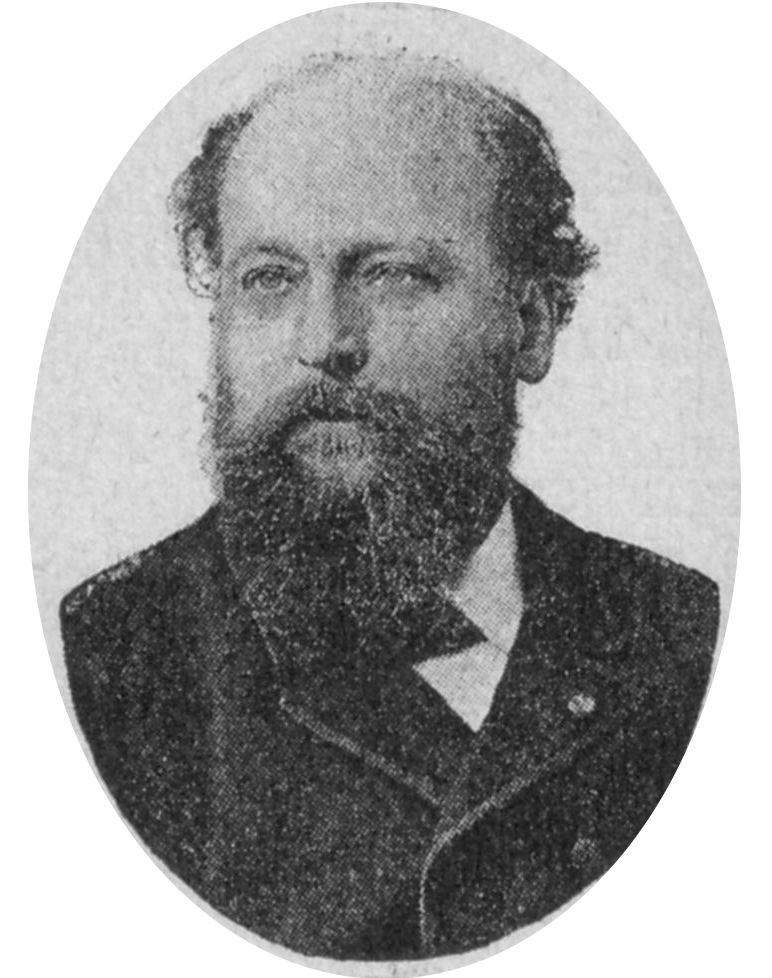
- Portrait of Charles Grandmougin from Moderní básníci francouzští, anthology of French poetry, published 1893.
- Born: 17 January 1850; Vesoul, France
- Died: 28 April 1930 (aged 80); Neuilly, France
- Occupation: Poet
- Writing career
- Genre: Poetry
- Notable works: La Vierge, Hulda

Charles-Jean Grandmougin (17 January 1850 – 28 April 1930) was a French poet and playwright. He lived in Paris. Two of his poems appeared in the third and final volume of Le Parnasse contemporain (1876). His poetry has been set as songs by composers including Fauré, Chaminade, Boulanger, Pierné and Bizet. He was more well known as a librettist and translator for operas and oratorios. He wrote the libretto for César Franck's opera Hulda, set in 11th-century Norway, and based on the play Lame Hulda (1858) by Norwegian writer Bjørnstjerne Bjørnson. He also wrote the libretto for La Vierge, an oratorio by Jules Massenet.

== Major works ==
- Esquisse sur Richard Wagner (1873)
- Les Siestes, poems (1874)
- Prométhée, drame antique (1878)
- Le Tasse, symphonie dramatique (1878)
- Nouvelles Poésies (1880)
- Souvenirs d’Anvers (1881)
- Orphée, drame antique en vers (1882)
- Caïn, biblical drama in verse
- Poèmes d’amour (1884)
- Rimes de combat (1886)
- À pleines voiles, poems (1888)
- L’Enfant Jésus, mystère en 5 parties et en vers
- Le Christ, sacred drama in verse, couronné par l’Académie française (1892)
- L’Empereur, epic drama in verse, in 13 scenes (1893)
- De la Terre aux Étoiles, poems (1897)
- Visions chrétiennes, récits en vers (1899)
- Le Réveillon, drama in one act, in verse
- La Vouivre, poème franc-comtois
- Les Serfs du Jura, drama in verse
- Aryénis, drama in verse
- La Chanson du village
- Medjour, story of the supernatural
- Les Heures divines, poems (1894)
- La Forêt mystérieuse, booklet
- Le Naufrage de l’amour, poem
- Contes d’aujourd’hui, prose
- Terre de France, poem
- Contes en prose
- Dernières Promenades (1910)
- Les Sirènes (1911)
