= Paul Lhérie =

French opera singer

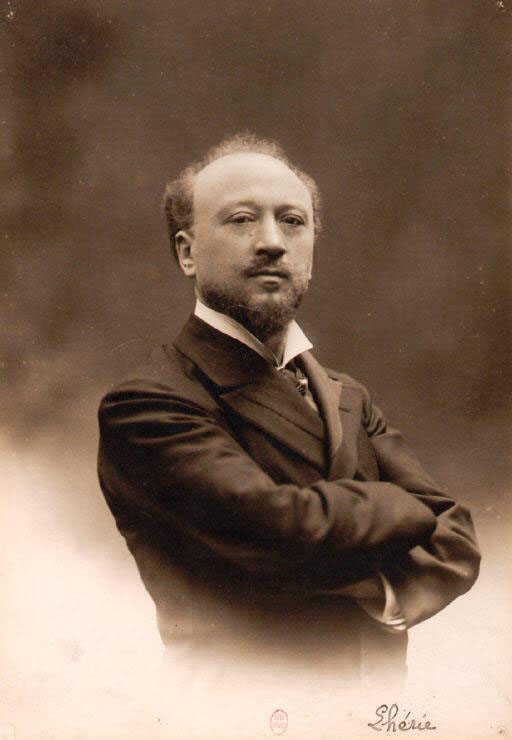
Paul Lhérie in 1890

Paul Lhérie (Lévy), (born 8 October 1844 in Paris; died 17 October 1937 in Paris) was a French tenor, then baritone, and later a vocal teacher. He was most famous for creating the role of Don José in Bizet's Carmen.

== Life and career ==
After studying in Paris, Lhérie made his debut at the Opéra-Comique in 1866 as Méhul's Joseph. He created the role of Charles II in Massenet's Don César de Bazan in 1872, Kornélis in Camille Saint-Saëns's La princesse jaune in 1872, Benoît in Delibes's Le roi l’a dit in 1873, and Don José in Carmen by Bizet in 1875. Bizet and Lhérie became friends during the preparations for Carmen. They would swim together in the Seine during the singer's visits to the composer's house in Bougival.

He became a baritone in 1882, singing Posa in the first performance of the Italian revised version of Verdi's Don Carlos at La Scala, Milan, two years later. He also spent time during the 1880s at Covent Garden in London, where he performed Zurga (in Les Pêcheurs de Perles), Rigoletto, Germont (La Traviata), Luna (Il trovatore), and Alphonse (La favorite). He sang Iago in Brescia in 1887 with Adalgisa Gabbi, José Oxilia and conductor Franco Faccio. He also sang Zurga and other roles in an Italian season at the Théâtre de la Gaîté in 1889, and created the role of Simeone Bardi in the premiere of Godard's Dante in 1890 at the Opéra Comique, having just reprised Zampa for his reappearance at the Salle Favart.

In Rome at the Teatro Costanzi on 31 October 1891, he was the first Rabbi David in the premiere of Mascagni's L'amico Fritz (he himself was Jewish) and repeated the role in Monte Carlo the same year. In 1894, he created Gudleik in Franck's Hulda, also in Monte Carlo.

Lhérie retired from the stage in 1894. In the last years of his life he taught opéra comique and opera at the Paris Conservatoire, prize-winners among his pupils included Léon Rothier, David Devriès, Suzanne Cesbron-Viseur, Ginette Guillamat and Geneviève Vix.
