= Adolphe Deloffre =

French violinist and conductor

Louis Michel Adolphe Deloffre (28 July 1817 – 8 January 1876) was a French violinist and conductor active in London and Paris, who conducted several important operatic premieres in the latter city, particularly by Charles Gounod and Georges Bizet.

== Career ==
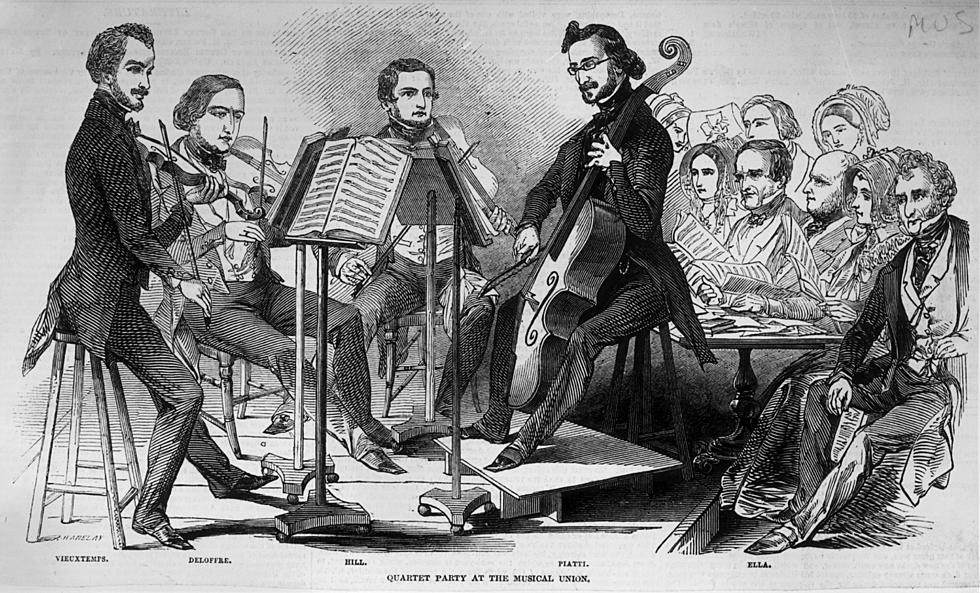
Quartet Party at the Musical Union, 1846. Deloffre, second from the left

Born in Paris, Deloffre's initial musical training was from his father, a violinist and guitarist. His violin teachers later included Bellon, de Lafont and Baillot, and he became recognised for his fine playing. He then set out from Paris for London with the French conductor Jullien and later became principal violinist at Her Majesty's Theatre under Balfe; he also played with the Philharmonic Society, the Sacred Harmony Society and the Musical Union. He would return each year to give concerts in Paris with his wife, a distinguished pianist, and a cellist from the Opéra, Pilet. He returned permanently to Paris to settle in 1851.

In 1852, Alphonse Varney, conductor of the Théâtre Lyrique, was replaced by August Francis Placet whose place was in turn taken by Deloffre, just returned from London. For the 1853-54 season Deloffre was promoted from principal violinist and assistant conductor to principal conductor. Hector Berlioz had criticisms of Deloffre's conducting style: he conducted with his bow while stamping his foot at the same time and sometimes tapping his bow on the prompter's box. However, Berlioz later praised Deloffre's conducting of the first performance of Les Troyens à Carthage in 1863.

As principal conductor at the Théâtre-Lyrique he conducted an important series of revivals of Mozart operas, starting with The Marriage of Figaro (as Les noces de Figaro) in May 1858 (he also conducted the premiere at the Opéra-Comique in 1872), then in May 1859 Die Entführung aus dem Serail (as L’Enlèvement au Sérail), Così fan tutte (as Peines d’Amours perdues) in March 1863, The Magic Flute (as La flûte enchantée) in February 1865, and Don Giovanni (as Don Juan in a translation by Henri Trianon) in 1866.

In addition Deloffre conducted other important operas: Oberon (in French) in February 1857 at the Théâtre-Lyrique, Fidelio (in French) in May 1860, Don Pasquale (in French) in September 1864, and La traviata (in French) in October 1864.

In 1858 Deloffre went to give concerts in Madrid with other artists from the Théâtre-Lyrique and Opéra-Comique following the French victory in the Battle of Solferino. On 18 November 1859 he conducted Berlioz’s arrangement of Gluck's Orphée et Eurydice. Deloffre was put in musical charge of a venture in 1868 to present opera at the Salle Ventadour under the name of the Théâtre de la Renaissance. He then moved to be principal conductor of the Opéra-Comique until his death.

He composed fantasies for violin and piano on themes from operas for his wife and himself to play, as well as string quartets. He left manuscripts of two symphonies, some piano trios, and other pieces for violin and piano.

Deloffre was a member of the Paris Conservatoire examination committees for strings, and for wind instruments, from 1871 until his death.

== Premieres conducted by Deloffre ==
- Le muletier de Tolède, 16 December 1854, Théâtre-Lyrique
- Les dragons de Villars, 19 September 1856, Théâtre-Lyrique (and 100th at Opéra-Comique on 17 May 1874)
- Le médecin malgré lui, 15 January 1858, Théâtre-Lyrique (also premiere at Opéra-Comique on 22 May 1872)
- Faust, 19 March 1859, Théâtre-Lyrique
- Philémon et Baucis, 18 February 1860, Théâtre-Lyrique (French premiere)
- Les pêcheurs de perles, 30 September 1863, Théâtre-Lyrique
- Les Troyens à Carthage, 4 November 1863, Théâtre-Lyrique
- Mireille, 19 March 1864, Théâtre-Lyrique (also revised 3-act version at Opéra-Comique on 10 November 1874)
- L'alcade (Uzepy), 9 September 1864, Théâtre-Lyrique.
- Roméo et Juliette, 27 April 1867, Théâtre-Lyrique (also Opéra-Comique premiere in January 1873)
- La jolie fille de Perth, 26 December 1867, Théâtre-Lyrique
- Djamileh, 22 May 1872, Opéra-Comique
- La princesse jaune, 12 June 1872, Opéra-Comique
- Le roi l’a dit, 24 May 1873, Opéra-Comique
- Carmen, 3 March 1875, Opéra-Comique

Deloffre was on the podium for several anniversary performances in Paris: the 500th performance of La fille du régiment at the Opéra-Comique on 4 December 1871, the 1,000th performance Le Pré aux clercs by Hérold at the Opéra-Comique on 7 December 1871, the 1,000th performance of Le Chalet by Adolphe Adam at the Opéra-Comique on 18 January 1873, and the 500th ('travesty') performance of Les Rendez-Vous Bourgeois by Nicolas Isouard on 20 March 1873.
