= La princesse jaune =

Opera by Camille Saint-Saëns

- opéra comique by Camille Saint-Saëns
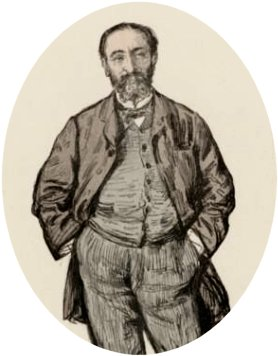
- Saint-Saëns in 1875
- Librettist: Louis Gallet
- Language: French
- Premiere: 12 June 1872; Opéra-Comique (Salle Favart Theatre), Paris, France

La princesse jaune (The Yellow Princess), Op. 30, is an opéra comique in one act and five scenes by composer Camille Saint-Saëns to a French libretto by Louis Gallet. The opera premiered at the Opéra-Comique (Salle Favart Theatre) in Paris on 12 June 1872.

Like many French artists at this time, Saint-Saëns was influenced by the Japonism movement in Paris. He appealed to this public taste by choosing a story about a Japanese princess, although it is set in the Netherlands. The music is characterised by a "light and brisk" quality that uses pentatonic harmony to evoke an "oriental" sound. The story follows Kornélis, a student who is fascinated by all things Japanese, and his cousin Léna, who is in love with Kornélis. Kornélis, however, is too obsessed with his portrait of Ming, a Japanese girl, to notice his cousin's affections for him. In a fantastical dream caused by a potion, Kornélis is transported to Japan. At first enthralled, he eventually becomes disillusioned as he comes to the realisation that he is in love with Léna.

== History ==
Although La princesse jaune is the third opera that Saint-Saëns composed, it was the first of his operas to be mounted on the opera stage. It was also his first collaboration with Louis Gallet, who would go on to write the librettos for several more operas and become a close friend of Saint-Saëns. La princesse jaune was commissioned for the Opéra-Comique by the company's director, Camille du Locle, as compensation for not being able to mount Saint-Saëns's other opera, Le timbre d’argent, as promised due to financial reasons. At the opera's 1872 premiere, it was grouped into a set of one-act operas which included Emile Paladilhe’s Le passant and Georges Bizet’s Djamileh. The evening was a complete flop and music critics were hostile to all three operas, a fact not surprising for Saint-Saëns, as critics were regularly hostile towards his music during this point in his career. The Opéra-Comique gave four more performances of the opera that season before they dropped it from their repertoire.

== Roles ==
Role	Voice type	Premiere Cast, 12 June 1872 (Conductor: Adolphe Deloffre)
Kornélis	tenor	Paul Lhérie
Léna	soprano	Alice Ducasse

== Synopsis ==
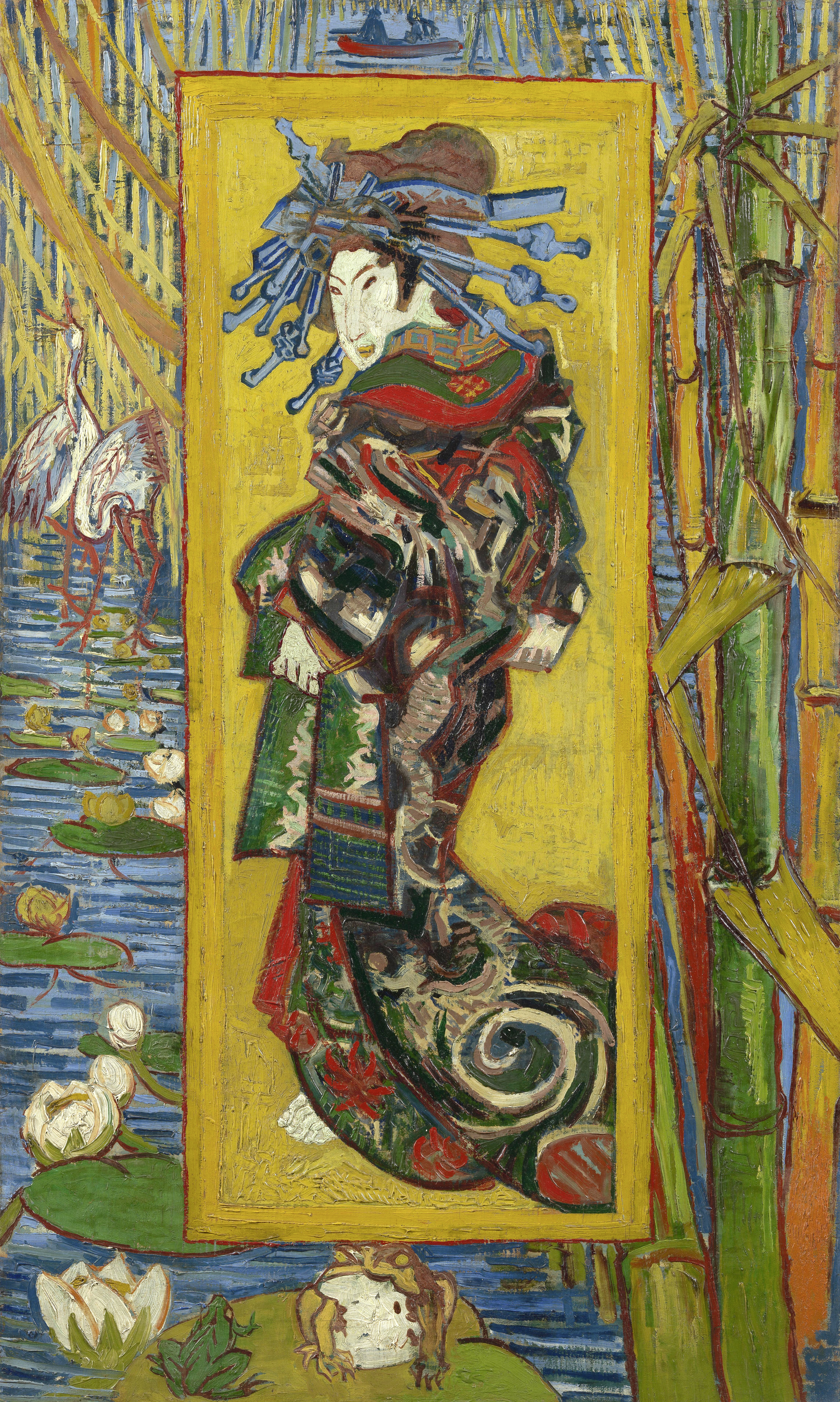
Van Gogh - La courtisane (after Eisen), 1887.

Place: Holland, at the home of Léna's parents
Time: Winter

=== Scene 1 ===
Léna and her cousin Kornélis, who is a recent orphan, live with her parents. She enters his study one morning to find he is not there. The study is in disarray with books, papers, and Kornélis' half-finished artistic endeavours strewn all over the place. Many of the objects reflect his interest in Japan. Léna starts to clean up everything for him and notes that he must have stayed up working all night. She finds a poem that confirms her suspicion that he is in love with the Japanese woman painted on the panel hung in the cabinet. Exasperated, she admits her secret love for her cousin and expresses her jealousy and spite for having to compete with a mere image for her cousin's affections.

=== Scene 2 ===
Kornélis returns to his room, absorbed in his thoughts. Léna asks him what he is so preoccupied with and whether he is happy. Kornélis evades her questions, but admits to his love for Japan and his desire to go there. An argument erupts when Léna seizes a small bottle that Kornélis brought back with him that morning, and of which he refuses to reveal the contents. She leaves his room in a huff.

=== Scene 3 ===
Léna contemplates her cousin's behaviour and begins to fret more and more over his obsessions. She wonders whether or not she should give up on him.

=== Scene 4 ===
Kornélis resumes pursuing his love affair with Japan, particularly fixating on his portrait of Ming, after the departure of Léna. He takes out his potion, supposedly from the Orient, and drinks it. The potion contains opium, and Kornélis continues his obsessive behaviour in a drugged state.

=== Scene 5 ===
Léna returns to Kornélis's room and finds him in a delirious state, lost in his daydreams. As Kornélis sinks deeper into his hallucinations, the Dutch cabinet transforms into a Japanese interior. Kornélis declares his passionate love to the woman who he thinks is Ming but is in fact a surprised Léna. She realises that he is in a deluded state and rejects his advances before fleeing the room in fear of more erratic behaviour. Kornélis eventually collapses on an armchair and the Dutch cabinet regains shape as he passes out. Léna, returning prudently, finds him in the armchair dreaming. He awakes and she angrily reproaches him for his wild behaviour and his madness for loving a dream, a woman who only exists in his imagination. As she rants, Kornélis' eyes are opened and he becomes aware of how much he actually loves Léna. He offers an apology, which she hesitantly accepts. They admit their love for one another and the opera ends.
