= Marguerite Chapuy =

French operatic soprano

External image
- Marguerite Chapuy

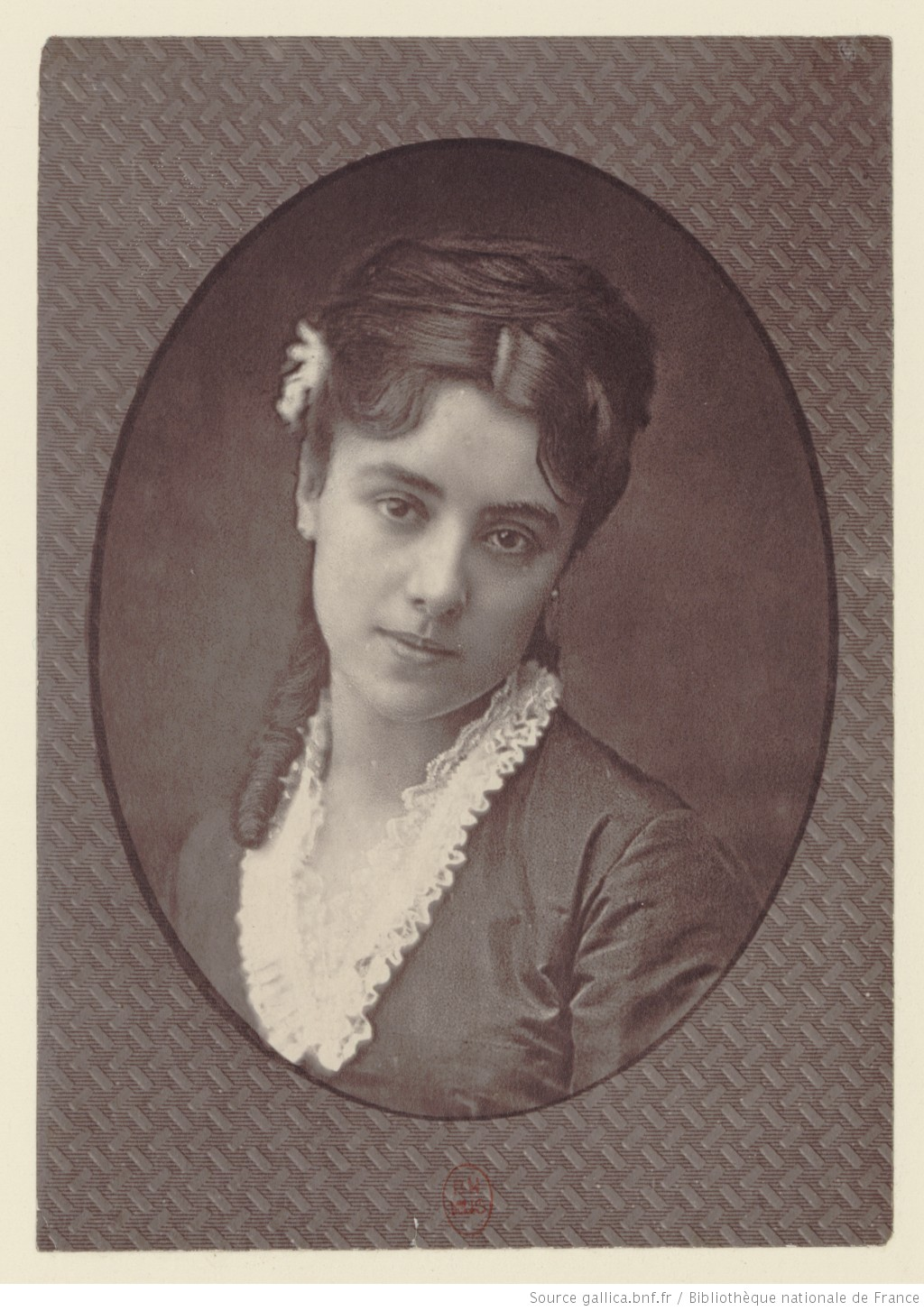
Marguerite Chapuy, c. 1880

Marguerite Chapuy (21 July 1852, Bordeaux – 23 September 1936, Dijon) was a French operatic soprano and the daughter of a former dancer at the Opéra. Her short professional career was concentrated on Paris but included appearances in London; she created several roles at the Opéra-Comique.

== Life and career ==
As a pupil of François-Joseph Regnier, she first considered an acting career, however after a disappointing debut at the vaudeville theatre she inclined towards the lyric theatre. She undertook lessons with Arnoldi (her first teacher having been Belloni), and during the Franco-Prussian War of 1870 she moved to Brussels, where she continued her vocal studies, followed by stage appearances in Rennes.

In 1872, Chapuy sang Susanna in Le nozze di Figaro, and Haydée by Auber at the Opéra Comique. She created the role of Philomène in Le roi l'a dit by Delibes on 24 May 1873. In March 1874 she sang Mignon.

She was invited by Mapleson to sing in London, where her repertoire included Zerlina, Susanna, Rosina and Lucia.

She sang Rose Friquet in the 100th performance of Les dragons de Villars on 17 May 1874, and Jeanette in the 500th performance of Les noces de Jeannette on 18 January 1875 at the Salle Favart.

Most notably Chapuy was the first Micaëla in Bizet's Carmen on 3 March 1875.

After the initial run of Carmen, Chapuy sang Rosina in The Barber of Seville in July 1875 at the Drury Lane Theatre, London. Later that year, she sang Rose de Mai in the revival of Le val d'Andorre by Halévy on 14 October, and Késie in Le calife de Bagdad on 18 December in honour of the Boieldieu centenary.

In the premiere of Henri Maréchal's opéra comique Les amoureux de Catherine on 8 May 1876, Chapuy sang Catherine. She then sang Baucis in the first performance of the 2-act version of Gounod's Philémon et Baucis (16 May 1876).

From 1874 to 1876, Chapuy sang the solo soprano part in the annual performances of Beethoven's 9th symphony given at the Société des concerts du Conservatoire.

In 1876 she married general Louis André (1838–1913), a major general of the French army at Notre-Dame-de-Lorette, Paris, and shortly after retired from the stage.
