= Alice Ducasse =

French opera singer

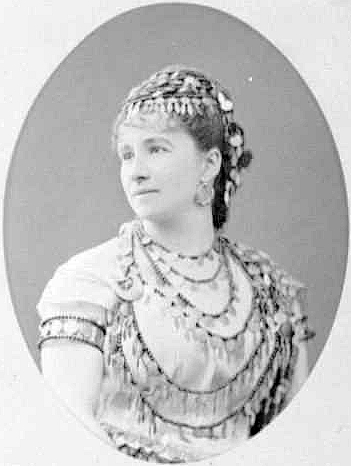
Alice Ducasse in 1875

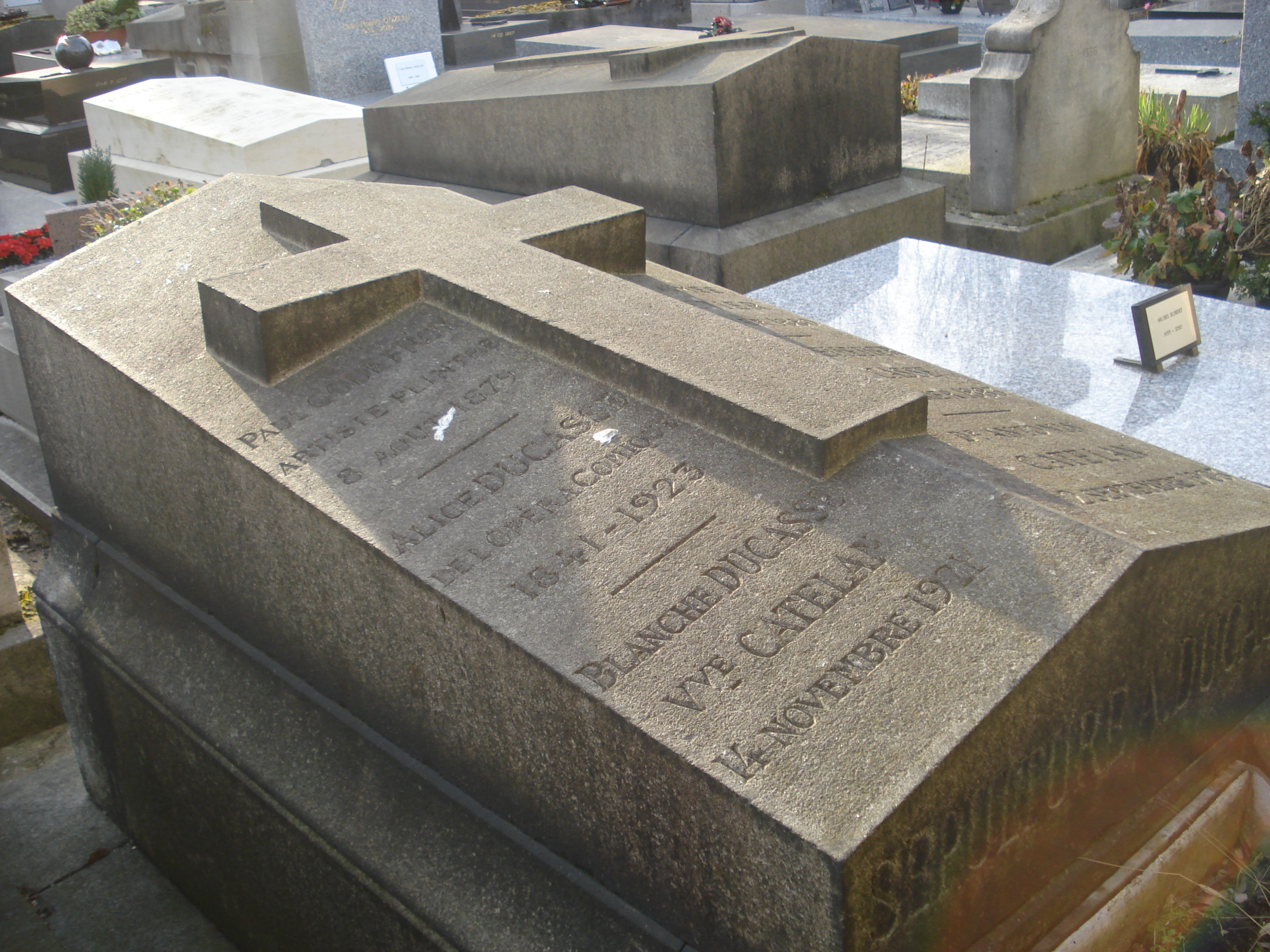
Grave in Montmartre Cemetery.

Anne-Elisa Alice Ducasse, was born in Valparaíso, Chile, on May 20, 1841, and died December 4, 1923, in Paris in the 9th arrondissement. She was an opera singer and teacher active in Paris.

== Biography ==
Alice Ducasse is the daughter of Pierre Édouard Ducasse and Blanche Aline Pelletier.

As a member of the company at the Théâtre Lyrique under Pasdeloup and Vizentini she sang various roles at that theatre, creating Mab in Bizet's La jolie fille de Perth, as well as Nérine in L'irato by Méhul (November 1868), Formosa in En Prison by Guiraud (March 1869), Thérèse in Don Quichotte by Boulanger (May 1869) and Nydia in Le Dernier Jour de Pompéi by Victorin Joncières (September 1869)

Moving over to the Opéra Comique she created Léna in the 1872 premiere of La princesse jaune, and Frasquita in the 1875 premiere of Carmen, as well as singing in the first Opéra Comique performances of works premiered elsewhere: Jacqueline in Le médecin malgré lui in 1872, Stéphano in Roméo et Juliette in 1873, a shepherd in the 1874 revival of Le pardon de Ploërmel, Nicette in the 1871 revival of Le Pré aux clercs (the 1,000th performance), Mirza in the 1876 production of Lalla-Roukh, Rita in the 1877 revival of Zampa (500th performance) and Papagena in the 1879 production of The Magic Flute.

Other roles included Bertrand in the 500th anniversary ('travesty') performance at the Opéra-Comique of Les Rendez-Vous Bourgeois by Isouard in March 1873, Georgette in Le val d'Andorre in October 1875, and Gillotin in Gille et Gillotin in March 1877. In October 1880, Ducasse sang Germaine in the premiere of Monsieur de Floridor at the Opéra-Comique.

After appearing as Marceline in The Marriage of Figaro in May 1882, Ducasse left the stage to take up teaching.

One of her students is the actress Amélie Diéterle.
