= Geneviève Vix =

French opera singer (1897–1939)

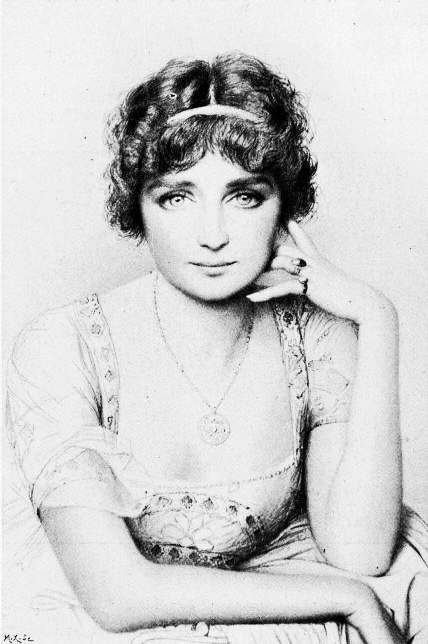
- Born: December 31, 1879; Le Havre
- Died: August 25, 1939; Paris

Geneviève Vix (née Brouwer; December 31, 1879 – August 25, 1939) was a French soprano. She was a descendant of the Dutch painter Adriaen Brouwer.

== Life and career ==
Vix studied at the Nantes Conservatoire and then at the Paris Conservatoire as a pupil of Lhérie where she won the first prize for opera in 1904 (as well as second prize for opéra comique). She made her debut at the Palais Garnier on 27 January 1905 in the title role in the premiere of Daria by Georges Marty, following this with Marguerite in Faust, Mélisse in Armide, and Juliette in Roméo et Juliette.

Vix made her debut at the Opéra-Comique on 27 September 1906 as Louise, and was a member of the company for six seasons, creating the roles of Concepción in L'heure espagnole in 1911 and Francesca in Francesca da Rimini (Leoni) in 1913. She also sang in Manon (title role), Carmen, Don Giovanni (Elvira), Tosca, La Traviata, Werther and Cendrillon at the Salle Favart. On 21 February 1908 she sang Geneviève in a revival of Geneviève de Brabant at the Théâtre des Variétés, Paris.

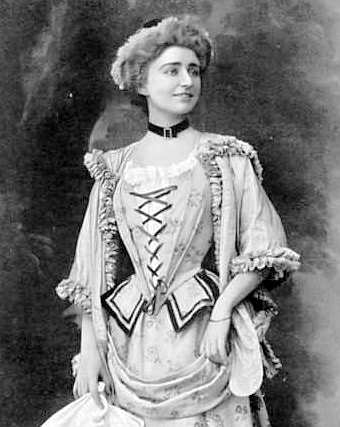
Vix in the title role of Massenet's Manon in 1906.

Vix later enjoyed an international career with appearances in Madrid, Buenos Aires, Montevideo, Rio de Janeiro, Havana, Chicago, New York, Boston, Rome, Cairo and Constantinople, adding Sapho, Salomé, Mélisande and Thaïs to her repertoire. In her later career Vix sang in lighter stage works in Paris, creating the title role in the revised version of Lais ou La Courtisane amoureuse by Charles Cuvillier in 1929 and La Duchesse de Mazarin in Florestan 1er, prince de Monaco by Heymann in 1933. She retired from the stage in 1935, and died in Paris.

She recorded airs from Carmen, Tosca, Thais, and Werther.

Her first marriage was to M. Muller de Cordevart (ended in divorce); the second to Kirill Vasil'evich Naryshkin (15 February 1877 – 25 October 1950) at Cannes on 2 October 1921. He was the son of Vasilii L'vovich Naryshkin and Princess Fevronia Pavlovna Jambakurian-Orbeliani, and had previously been married to Vera Sergeevna Witte (née Lisanevich), the adopted step-daughter of the Russian prime minister Count Sergei Yulyevich Witte. Vix was also the sometime mistress of King Alfonso XIII of Spain.

She is buried at the Sainte-Geneviève-des-Bois Russian Cemetery near Paris.
