= Djamileh =

Opéra comique by Georges Bizet

- Opera by Georges Bizet
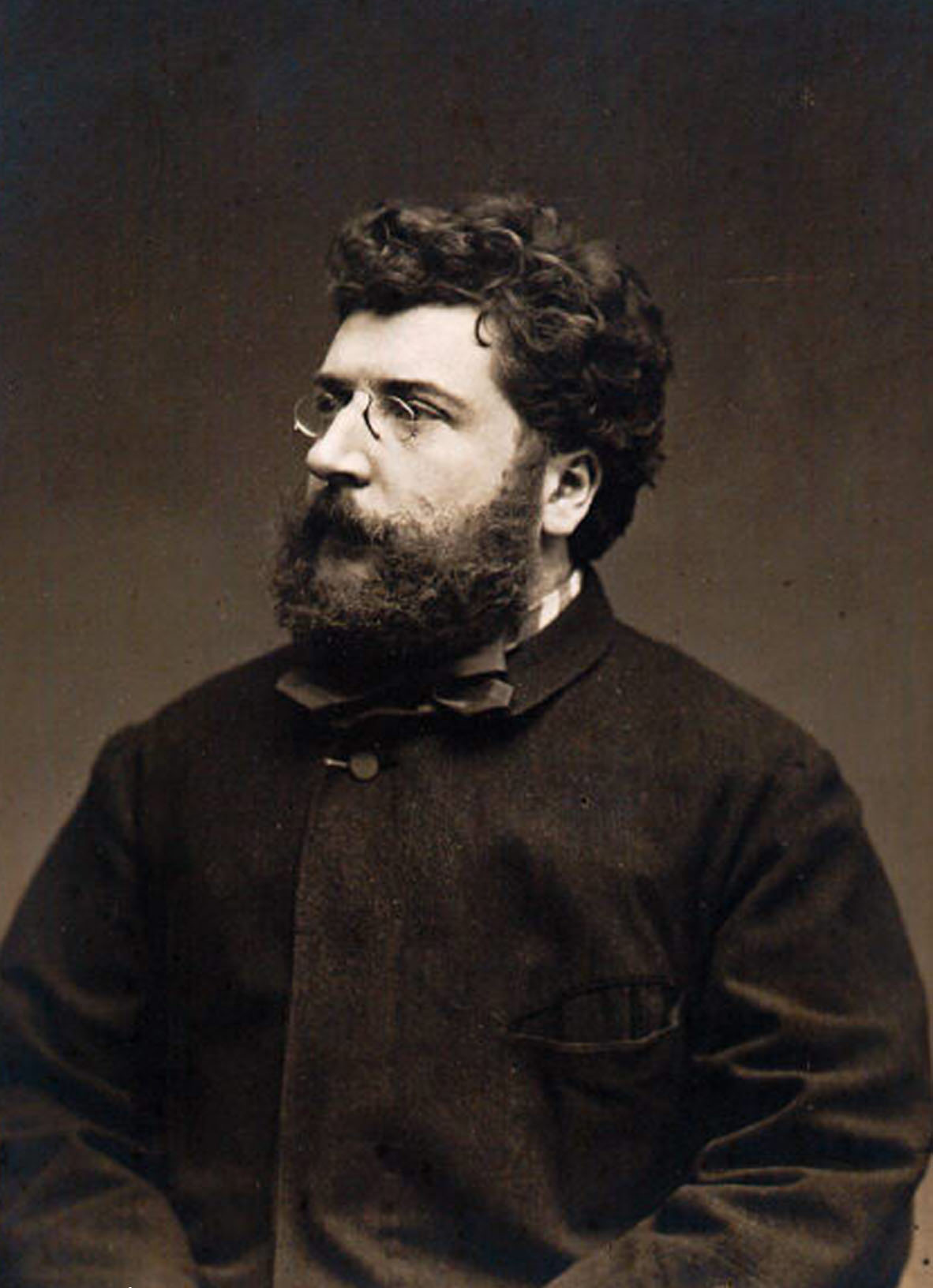
- The composer in 1875
- Librettist: Louis Gallet
- Language: French
- Based on: Namouna by Alfred de Musset
- Premiere: 22 May 1872; Opéra-Comique, Paris

Djamileh is an opéra comique in one act by Georges Bizet to a libretto by Louis Gallet, based on an oriental tale, Namouna, by Alfred de Musset.

== Composition history ==
De Musset wrote Namouna in 1832, consisting of 147 verses in three 'chants' (only the last dozen or so deal with the tale of Namouna). In 1871 when Bizet was stalled on other projects for the stage, Camille du Locle, director of the Opéra-Comique suggested to him a piece written some years earlier by Louis Gallet based on Namouna. After some hesitation, Bizet composed the work during the late summer of 1871 but the premiere production was delayed due to trouble in finding suitable singers.

The original production formed part of a trio of new short works at the Opéra-Comique that spring: Paladilhe's Le Passant in April, then Djamileh, and La princesse jaune (also an orientalist work) by Saint-Saëns in June. Bizet had wanted Galli-Marié (the first Carmen) or Marguerite Priola to create the title role - both were singing in the Paladilhe piece, but was obliged to take instead the inadequate Prelly.

On 17 June, Bizet wrote to a friend that, despite the lack of success of his new piece, he at least felt that he had found his path as a composer.

== Performance history ==
Djamileh received its first performance on 22 May 1872 at the Opéra-Comique, Paris. Although du Locle had lavished great care on the costumes and sets, after ten performances in 1872 it was not revived in Paris until 27 October 1938. Outside France productions were mounted in Stockholm (1889), Rome (1890), and Dublin, Prague, Manchester and Berlin (1892).

The opera has been neglected for most of its existence, despite the admiration it received from both Gustav Mahler, who, after introducing it in Hamburg (21 October 1892), conducted nineteen performances of it at the Vienna State Opera between 1898 (first performance there 22 January 1898) and 1903, and Richard Strauss, who viewed it as a source of inspiration for Ariadne auf Naxos. Jussi Björling sang Haroun in a 1933 revival of an earlier production at the Royal Swedish Opera, Stockholm.

Productions were mounted in 2008 by DCA Theater in Chicago and, in 2010, by the Opera Theater of Pittsburgh, directed by Jonathan Eaton and starring Matt Morgan as Haroun, Daniel Teadt as Splendiano, and Christina Nassif in the title role.

== Roles ==
| Role | (Name of character in de Musset) | Voice type | Premiere Cast, 22 May 1872 (Conductor: Adolphe Deloffre) |
|---|---|---|---|
| Djamileh | (Namouna) | mezzo-soprano | Aline Prelly (Baroness de Presles) |
| Haroun | (Hassan) | tenor | Alphonse Duchesne |
| Splendiano | (not in de Musset) | baritone | Pierre-Armand Potel |
| A slave merchant | - | spoken | M Julien |
Chorus of friends of Haroun, slaves, musicians

== Synopsis ==
Setting: Haroun's palace, in Cairo

At the end of day the caliph Haroun reclines and smokes in his palace, with his servant Splendiano; an off-stage chorus sing. The slave-girl Djamileh passes through the room unseen by Haroun, gazing tenderly at him.
Splendiano is looking over his master’s accounts when Haroun asks Splendiano where Djamileh is – and is told that she is near at hand, still in love. He remarks also that she will be disappointed as her month as lover to the sultan is nearly finished and she will be replaced. Haroun denies that he is in love with her and demands that she be sent away and a new girl brought. Splendiano confides that he is taken with Djamileh. Haroun’s heart is a desert: he loves no woman, only love itself. This gives hope to Splendiano that he will have Djamileh.

Haroun asks for supper to be served. Djamileh enters, dejected, and tells him of a bad dream she had where she was drowning in the sea, looking for him to save her, but there was no one. Haroun, aware of some affection for her, reassures her, and supper is served.

Haroun offers Djamileh a necklace. His friends arrive to spend the night playing dice. Before Djamileh can leave she is seen by the men who express their admiration; Djamileh is left hurt and confused, while Splendiano feels sure he will succeed in his conquest. He explains to Djamileh that she must leave and regain her freedom - and offers his love. She proposes that he present her to Haroun, disguised as the next slave-girl, and promises that if she fails to win Haroun’s heart that way she will give herself to Splendiano. Alone, she expresses her anxiety about her destiny and the fragility of love.

To Haroun's irritation, Splendiano interrupts the gambling to say that the slave merchant has brought a new girl, who then dances an almah; Haroun remains indifferent and returns to the game. Splendiano asks the merchant to replace the dancer with Djamileh, while being certain that she will soon be his.

Veiled, Djamileh enters in the dancer’s costume and, shy and nervous, makes to leave. Haroun, whose interest is now aroused, sends Splendiano to take his place at the games table.

Djamileh cries, but Haroun consoles her. As moonlight illuminates the room, Haroun recognizes her and begins to realize that she loves him. He tries to resist his own feelings but eventually gives in. Splendiano has lost.

== Music and orchestration ==
Despite the lack of drama or strong characterisation in the libretto, Bizet managed to overcome those weaknesses with strongly evocative music. The offstage chorus evoking sunset over the Nile, the changing moods of Haroun, and Splendiano's witty couplets (the latter more traditional opéra comique fare) are evidence of Bizet's growing musical powers. In his portrayal of Djamileh, his music looks forward to Ravel rather than back to Gounod; indeed much of Bizet's harmony baffled contemporary Parisian critics. At the Vienna production, the critic Eduard Hanslick was particularly taken with the exotic L'Almée, danse et choeur.

Orchestration
2 flutes (one doubling piccolo), 2 oboes (one doubling cor anglais), 2 clarinets, 2 bassoons, 4 horns, 2 cornets, 3 trombones, timpani, percussion, harp, strings. On stage: piano and tambourine, harp.

== Recordings ==
- Bizet: Djamileh (Lucia Popp, Franco Bonisolli, Jean-Philippe Lafont; Conductor: Lamberto Gardelli - Munich Radio Orchestra) 1983. Label: Orfeo
- Bizet: Djamileh (Marie-Ange Todorovitch, Jean-Luc Maurette, François le Roux; Conductor: Jacques Mercier - l'Orchestre National d'Île de France) 1988 Label: RCA
