= La jolie fille de Perth =

1867 opera by Georges Bizet

- Opera by Georges Bizet
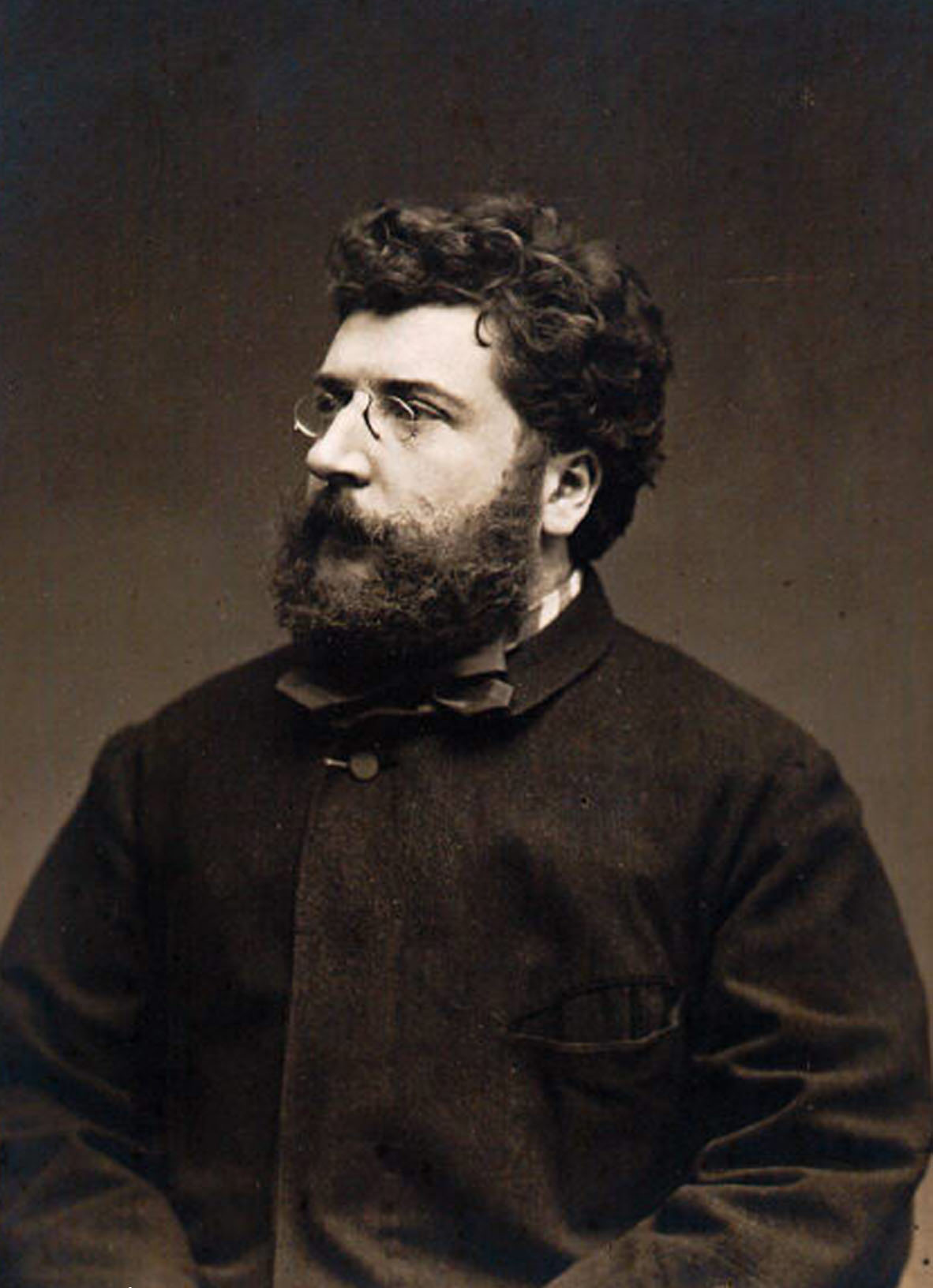
- Bizet in 1875
- Translation: The Fair Maid of Perth
- Librettist: Jules-Henri Vernoy de Saint-Georges; Jules Adenis
- Language: French
- Based on: The Fair Maid of Perth by Sir Walter Scott
- Premiere: 26 December 1867; Théâtre Lyrique, Paris

La jolie fille de Perth (The Fair Maid of Perth) is an opera in four acts by Georges Bizet (1838–1875), from a libretto by Jules-Henri Vernoy de Saint-Georges and Jules Adenis, after the 1828 novel The Fair Maid of Perth by Sir Walter Scott. Many writers have reserved severe criticism for the librettists for their stock devices and improbable events, while praising Bizet's advance on his earlier operas in construction of set pieces and his striking melodic and instrumental ideas.

It was first performed at the Théâtre Lyrique (Théâtre-Lyrique Impérial du Châtelet), Paris, on 26 December 1867.

== Performance history ==
Although commissioned by Léon Carvalho in 1866 and completed by Bizet by the end of that year (with the soprano lead intended for Christine Nilsson), the dress rehearsal took place in September 1867 and the first performance three months later. It was next revived in Paris on 3 November 1890 at the Éden-Théâtre for eleven performances with Cécile Mézeray as Catherine and Émile Engel as Smith; and the same year was seen in Barcelona. During her years singing in Italy in the late 1880s Emma Calvé sang the title role.

La jolie fille de Perth was performed in Brussels in 1868 and Geneva in 1885; in German it was given in Weimar and Vienna in 1883, and in English in Manchester and London in 1917. A production for the Oxford University Opera Club in November 1955 conducted by Jack Westrup, the Opera critic noting "On the implest level, Bizet beats Sandy Wilson at his own game; given a bit of luck, The Fair Maid ought to be a West End success. Hit-number follows hit number. Not that it is all operetta, or the least bit vulgar", adding that "the libretto is one of the silliest that can ever have been devised.

It was staged at the Wexford Festival in 1968, the Sarasota Opera in 1996, the Théâtre Impérial de Compiègne in 1998, the Buxton Festival in 2006, and the New National Theatre, Tokyo in 2008 and recorded by the BBC in Manchester for the Bizet centenary in 1975.

== Roles ==
Roles, voice types, premiere cast
Role	Voice type	Premiere cast, 26 December 1867 Conductor: Adolphe Deloffre
Henri (Henry) Smith, a blacksmith	tenor	M Massy
Cathérine Glover	soprano	Jeanne Devriès
Simon Glover, her father, a glover	bass	Émile Wartel
Mab, Queen of the Gypsies	soprano	Alice Ducasse
Ralph, Glover's apprentice	bass-baritone	F Lutz
Le Duc de Rothsay, Duke of Rothsay	baritone	Auguste Armand Barré
A Lord in his service	tenor	M Boudias
His Major-Domo	bass	M Guyot
A worker	bass	M Neveu
Chorus: Smith's workers, the watch patrol, masqueraders, gipsies, guests of the duke, noblemen, artisans, bachelors and young girls.

== Synopsis ==
Place: Perth, Scotland
Time: 14th century

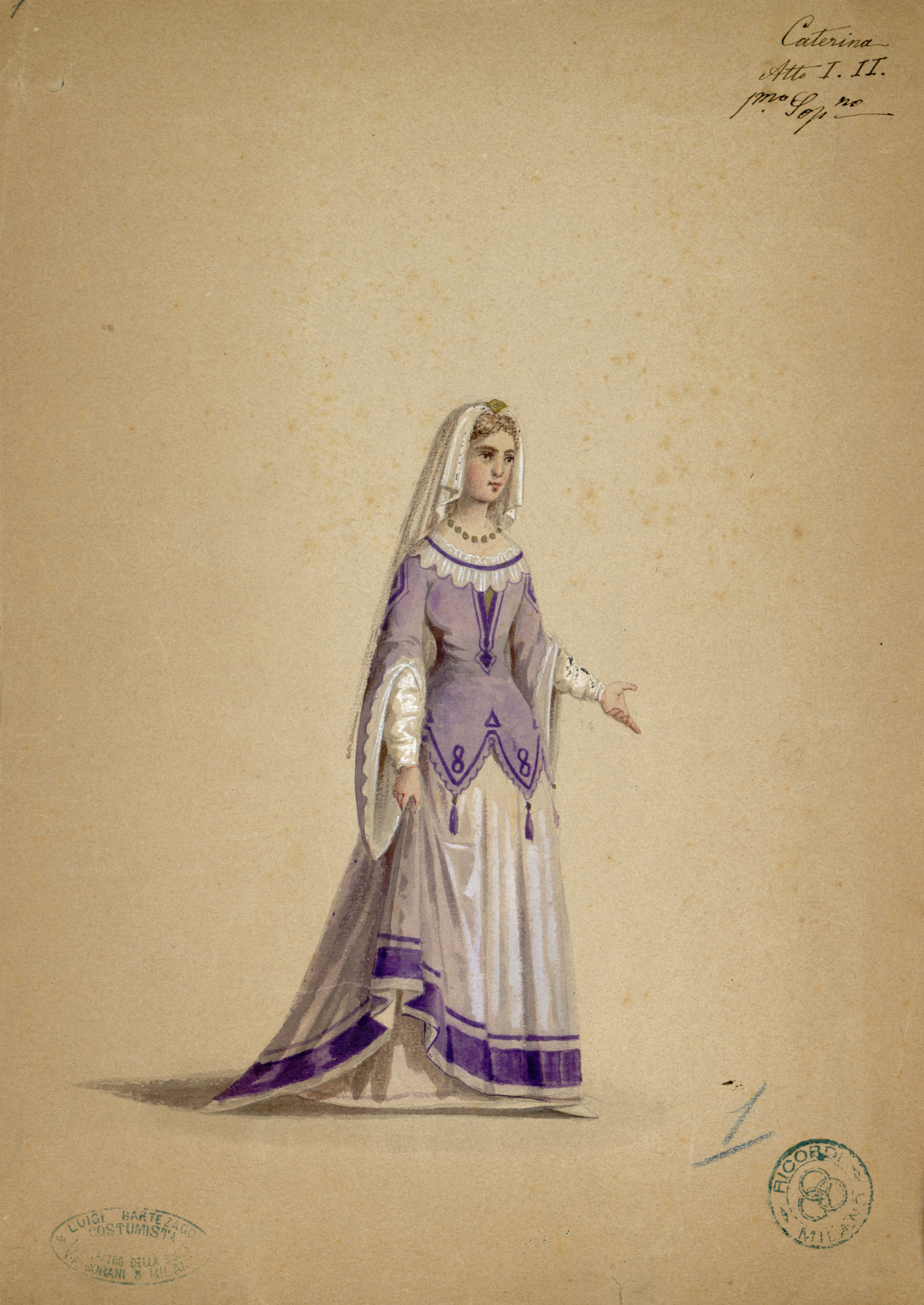
Cathérine, costume design by Luigi Bartezago

=== Act 1 ===
The workshop of Henry Smith the armourer

Workmen sing in the forge, on the eve of the Carnival. Alone, Smith muses on whether the coquettish Catherine Glover will consent to be his Valentine. Mab, Queen of the Gypsies enters hurriedly, seeking refuge in Smith's workshop from pursuing noblemen. When Catherine arrives unexpectedly, Mab hides in an adjoining room. Catherine, her father the glove-maker and his apprentice Ralph enter. Catherine sings of the joys of winter, and the two men retire to leave her and Smith alone. Smith gives his beloved a rose brooch in advance of St Valentine's Day. However, a stranger now enters and asks Smith to straighten the blade of his dagger. He is the Duke of Rothsay, who proceeds to flirt with Catherine, infuriating Smith, who is about to land a blow on the Duke when Mab comes from her hiding-place to protect him. Glover returns to a scene of confusion; Catherine throws away the rose, but Mab picks it up to return it later.

=== Act 2 ===
A square in Perth

Later that evening the watch, including Glover, are on their rounds. They are scared off by revellers, who gather beneath Catherine's window. Mab joins them and dances. The Duke asks her to bring Catherine, masked, to a ball at his palace that night. Although Mab initially laughs at the Duke's fickleness, she agrees, but swears vengeance. As the stage empties, Smith enters and serenades his sweetheart, unsuccessfully. As midnight strikes, Ralph enters, drunk and in despair at not being loved. As the Duke's steward asks him where Catherine Glover lives, a lady like her gets into a litter and is driven away. Coming to his senses, Ralph sends Smith after the litter; when the real Catherine deigns to reply to her lover's serenade he is gone.

=== Act 3 ===
Night-time festivities at the Duke's palace.

The Duke tells his friends that his latest conquest will shortly arrive and a masked lady appears, but will only unmask for him. Alone together, Mab removes her domino, then flees, leaving her lover only Catherine's enamelled rose she had been wearing on her bodice. Next Smith arrives to a deserted ballroom, lamenting Catherine's infidelity. Soon it is morning, and time for the Duke's audience. While Smith hides, the Duke receives Glover, who invites him to his daughter's approaching wedding. The Duke is surprised, and Smith bursts in and accuses Catherine of betrayal. She protests, and he forgives her, but then notices that the Duke has her enamelled rose, confirming all his suspicions.

=== Act 4 ===
1st tableau – a wild spot

A few hours later; Smith is seated by a tree, his head in his hands. Ralph and some artisans try to convince Smith of Catherine's innocence. Ralph agrees to meet Smith in a duel to decide her honour. Catherine now comes on the scene and Smith says he will allow himself to be killed to restore her honour to her.

2nd tableau – the main square in Perth

Mab comes to let Catherine know that the Duke intervened to prevent the duel between Smith and Ralph. However, Glover informs Mab that his daughter has lost her mind – Catherine appears and sings a distracted ballad. To shock her back to her senses, Mab decides to appear at her window and sing a reply to Smith's serenade. Catherine regains herself, swoons in the arms of Smith, and revives believing that it was all a dream, and all prepare for a joyous St Valentine's Day.

== Suite ==
An orchestral suite of movements from the opera (sometimes titled 'Scènes bohémiennes') was published, with concert performances and later recordings.

The movements are Prélude (to act 1), Sérénade (from "Viens, ma belle, je t'attends" for Smith in act 2), Marche (from the opening of act 2, "Bon citoyens"), and Danse bohémienne (Divertissement from act 2).

== In film ==
At the beginning of the Soviet time loop movie Mirror for a Hero (1988), there is the Russian version of Smith's Sérénade sung by Gennady Pishchayev.

== Recordings ==
- 1949 Gwen Catley – Catherine Glover; Richard Lewis – Harry Smith; Trefor Jones – Duke of Rothsay; Norman Walker – Ralph; Lorely Dyer – Mab, Queen of the Gypsies; Owen Brannigan – Simon Glover; BBC Theatre Chorus, Chorus Master John Clements; Royal Philharmonic Orchestra conducted by Sir Thomas Beecham. (An English version, (trans. by Paul England, broadcast live on 5–6 June 1949 by the BBC, issued by Beulah (1-2PD23) in 2000.)
- 1985 June Anderson – Cathérine Glover; Alfredo Kraus – Henri Smith; Gino Quilico – Le Duc de Rothsay; José van Dam – Ralph; Margarita Zimmermann – Mab, Queen of the Gypsies; Gabriel Bacquier – Simon Glover; Chœurs de Radio-France, Nouvel Orchestre Philharmonique, conductor Georges Prêtre. EMI 747 559-8
