= Les noces de Jeannette =

Opera by Victor Massé

Les noces de Jeannette (French pronunciation: [le nɔs də ʒanɛt], Jeannette's Wedding) is an opéra comique in one act by Victor Massé to a libretto by Jules Barbier and Michel Carré. It had its premiere in Paris in the Salle Favart at the Opéra-Comique, 4 February 1853.

== Roles and role creators ==
- Jean baritone – Joseph-Antoine-Charles Couderc
- Jeannette soprano – Marie-Caroline Miolan-Carvalho
- Pierre tenor – Begat
- Thomas bass – Louis Palianti

== Recordings ==
- Ninon Vallin (Jeannette), Léon Ponzio (Jean), M. Laurent (Thomas), Mme. De Busson (Pierre), Orchestra and chorus of the Opéra-Comique, Paris, conductor Laurent Halet. Recorded by Pathé in 1922. Reissued by Marston Records, Marston 53010-2 (2011).
