= Marie Caroline Miolan-Carvalho =

French operatic soprano (1827–1895)

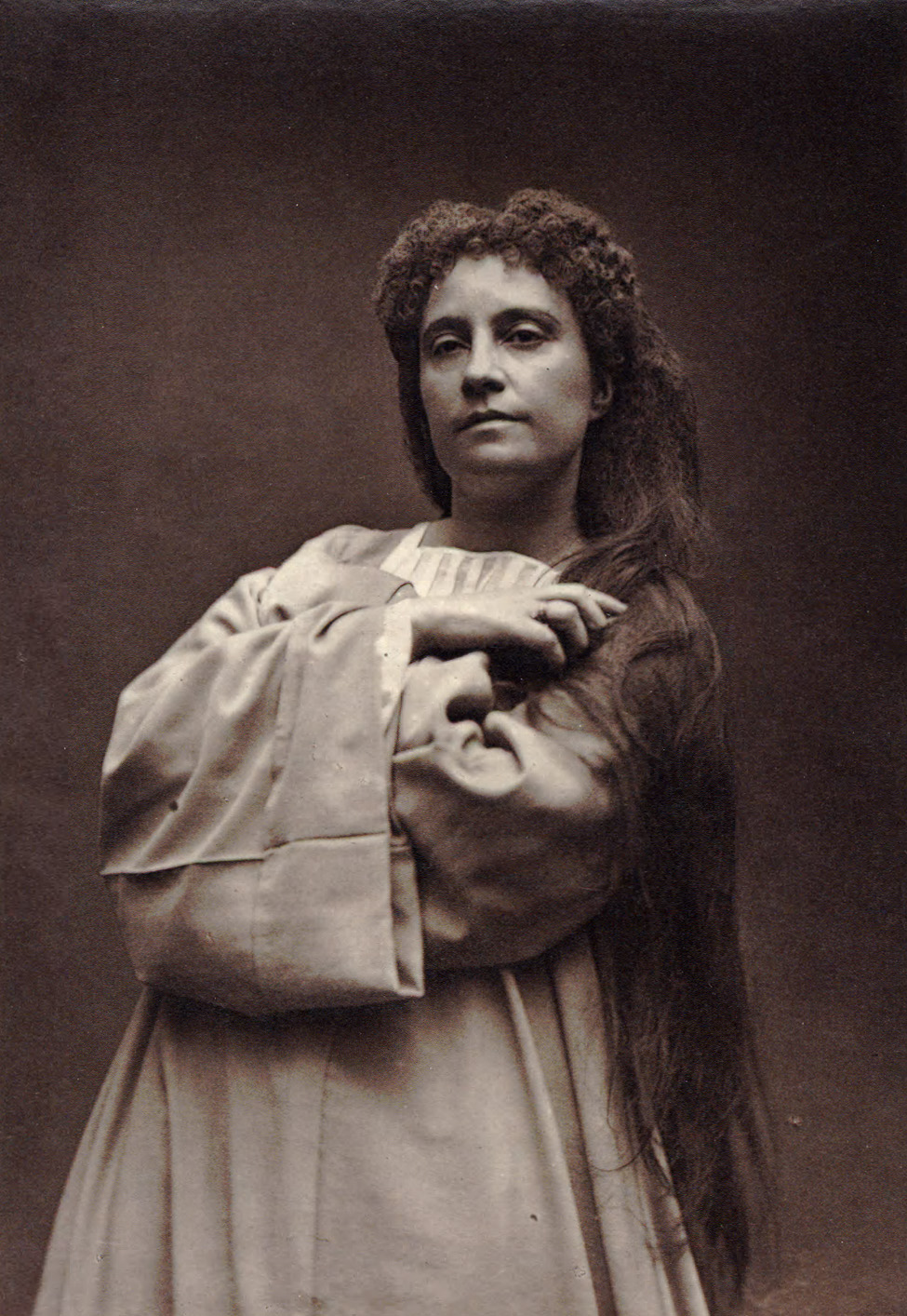
Caroline Carvalho as Marguerite in Gounod's Faust (1873)

Marie Caroline Miolan-Carvalho (31 December 1827 in Marseille – 10 July 1895 in Château-Puys, near Dieppe) was a famed French operatic soprano, particularly associated with light lyric and coloratura roles.

== Biography ==
Born Marie Caroline Félix-Miolan, she studied first with her father, François Félix-Miolan, an oboist, and later at the Conservatoire of Paris with Gilbert Duprez. After winning the first prize at the Conservatorie, she began touring throughout France, making her stage debut in Brest, as Isabelle in Robert le Diable, in 1849. Upon returning to Paris the following year, Marie Miolan made her debut in the title role in Lucia di Lammermoor at the Grand Opera on December 14, 1849. She went on to sing in Le Pré aux clercs, Les Huguenots, Der Freischütz, Hamlet, etc.

From 1849 to 1855 and 1868 to 1885, Miolan-Carvalho sang in Paris at the Opéra-Comique as Caroline Carvalho. In 1853, she married Léon Carvalho, a French impresario and director of Théâtre Lyrique. After their marriage, she began to use the name Caroline Carvalho instead of Marie Miolan becoming the prima donna at the Théâtre Lyrique appearing from 1856 to 1867. She performed mostly in Mozart and Rossini roles, but also created there an estimated 30 roles, notably by Charles Gounod such as Marguerite in Faust (1859) where she notably inspired Gounod to remove sections of the score. Other works include Baucis in Philémon et Baucis (1860), the title role in Mireille (1864) and Juliette in Roméo et Juliette (1867), but also Louis Clapisson's La Fanchonnette, Victor Massé's Les noces de Jeanette, Ambroise Thomas's La cour de Célimène.

In 1859, Miolan-Carvalho made her first appearance at Royal Opera House in London in Giacomo Meyerbeer's Dinorah. She performed regularly there until 1864 and again in 1871-72 where she was Gilda, Mathilde, Marguerite de Valois, Marguerite and Countess Almaviva. She also appeared in Berlin and Saint Petersburg.

Miolan-Carvalho retired from the stage in 1885, as Marguerite. After retirement, she taught singing in Paris where her most notable student was Maria Delna.

Noted for her vocal purity and coloratura precision, she was one of the most famous French singers of her day. She often encouraged composers to write their scores that would showcase her vocal technique. Because of this, she was well known for keeping audiences attentive and for receiving large rounds of applause.

== Sources ==
- Le guide de l'opéra, Mancini & Rouveroux, (Fayard, 1986) ISBN 978-2-213-01563-7.
