= Le timbre d'argent =

Opera by Camille Saint-Saëns

- Opéra fantastique by Camille Saint-Saëns
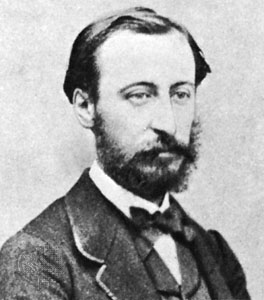
- Camille Saint-Saëns in 1875
- Translation: The Silver Bell
- Librettist: Jules Barbier and Michel Carré
- Language: French
- Premiere: 23 February 1877; Théâtre de la Gaîté, Paris

Le timbre d'argent (French pronunciation: [lə tɛ̃bʁ daʁʒɑ̃], The Silver Bell) is an opéra fantastique in four acts by composer Camille Saint-Saëns to a French libretto by Jules Barbier and Michel Carré. Although completed in 1865, the opera did not receive its premiere performance until 23 February 1877, when it was presented by Albert Vizentini's Théâtre National Lyrique at the Théâtre de la Gaîté in Paris. It includes the well-known aria "Le bonheur est chose légère".

== History ==
Le timbre d'argent is the first opera that Saint-Saëns composed. The opera was commissioned by the Théâtre Lyrique and he began composing the music for it in 1864, finishing in 1865. The work's premiere was delayed, first by the financial difficulties of the opera house and then later by the Franco-Prussian War. Over the next 12 years Saint-Saëns recomposed the dialogue to form a Grand Opera version, but Albert Vizentini and his Théâtre National Lyrique, who finally staged it, decided to use the original 1865 rendition for the opera's premiere in 1877. The grand opera version was first performed in 1913.

== Roles ==
Roles, voice types, premiere cast
Role	Voice type	Premiere cast, 23 February 1877 Conductor: Jules Danbé
Dr. Spiridion	baritone	Léon Melchissédec
Conrad	tenor	Blum
Circé/Fiammetta	mute (ballerina)	Théodore
Hélène	soprano	Caroline Salla
Rosa	soprano	Sablairolles
Bénédict	tenor	Victor Caisso

== Synopsis ==
Conrad, an artist, has an unhealthy obsession for gold, and is further engrossed by his own painting of Circe, embodied in the living world by Fiametta, a ballerina. Conrad is given a silver bell by Dr Spiridion: when he strikes the bell he will receive all the gold he craves for, but at the cost of someone's death. The opera concludes with the realization that all of the events have only occurred within Conrad's own fevered mind.

== Textual and musical analysis ==
The librettists for Le timbre d'argent also notably penned the librettos for Gounod's Faust and Offenbach's Les contes d'Hoffmann, and Saint-Saëns's opera serves as a "significant link" between these two. All three of these operas explore the hero's reliance on a menacing older man imposed by a diabolic pact. The character of Conrad is similar in many ways to that of Hoffman in Offenbach's opera, and the villainous character of Dr. Spiridion correspond well to Offenbach's villains (Lindorf, Coppélius, Dapertutto, and Dr Miracle).

While the music of Le timbre d'argent is both "versatile and fluent", the drama at times poses difficulties, especially the mimed part of Fiametta and the somewhat weak revelation of truth at the opera's end. However, there are several effectively bold scenes such as a theatre viewed from the back of the stage and a number of imaginative transformations. A number of the positive aspects of this opera undoubtedly influenced Offenbach's Les contes d'Hoffmann, as his first focused efforts on composing Hoffman took place during the first 18 performances of Le timbre d'argent in 1877.

== Recordings ==
Le Timbre d'argent (in the version without cuts for La Monnaie, 1914), was revived at the Opéra Comique Salle Favart in June 2017 by Les Siècles orchestra, Accentus choir, conducted by François-Xavier Roth and was recorded with the support of the Centre de musique romantique française.
