= Michel Carré =

French librettist (1821–1872)

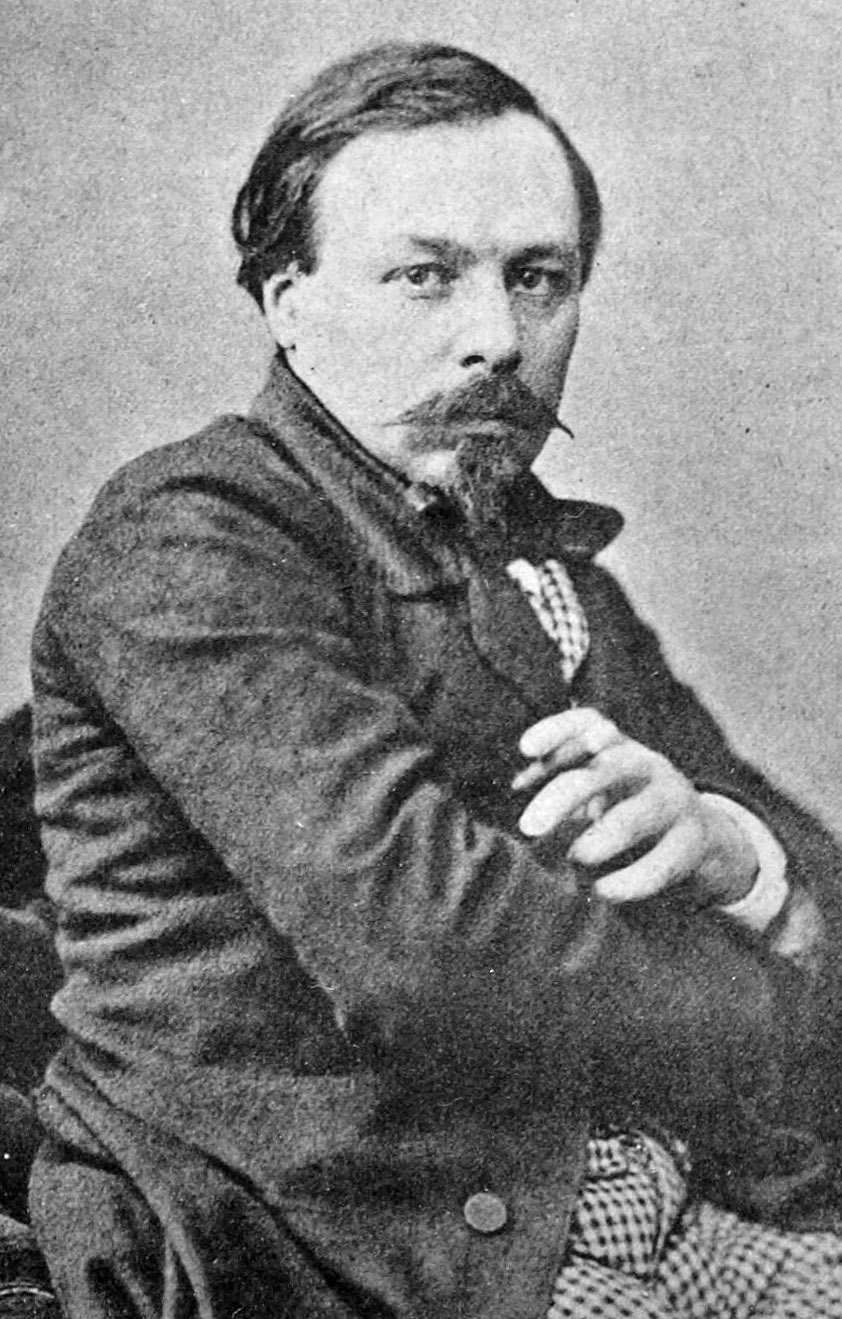
Michel Carré

Michel Carré (French pronunciation: [miʃɛl kaʁe]; 20 October 1821, Besançon – 27 June 1872, Argenteuil) was a prolific French librettist.

He went to Paris in 1840 intending to become a painter but took up writing instead. He wrote verse and plays before turning to writing libretti. He wrote the text for Charles Gounod's Mireille (1864) on his own, and collaborated with Eugène Cormon on Bizet's Les pêcheurs de perles. However, the majority of his libretti were completed in tandem with Jules Barbier, with whom he wrote the libretti for numerous operas, including Camille Saint-Saëns's Le timbre d'argent (libretto written in 1864, first performed in 1877), Gounod's Faust (1859), Roméo et Juliette (1867), and Offenbach's Les contes d'Hoffmann (1881). As with the other libretti by Barbier and himself, these were adaptations of existing literary masterworks.

His son, Michel-Antoine Carré (1865–1945), followed in his father's footsteps, also writing libretti, and later directing silent films. His nephew Albert Carré (1852–1938) also wrote libretti.

== List of works with libretti by Michel Carré ==
| Title | Composer | Collaborator | Year | Notes |
|---|---|---|---|---|
| Yvonne et Loïc | Charles Delioux | | 1854 | Produced at the Théâtre du Gymnase |
| Victoire! | Adolphe Adam | | 1855 | Cantata to celebrate the Battle of Sevastopol, words by Carré alone |
| Les pêcheurs de perles | Georges Bizet | Eugène Cormon | 1863 | Adapted from Octave Sachot's L'ile de Ceylan et ses curiosités naturales |
| Don Quichotte | Ernest Boulanger | Jules Barbier | 1869 | |
| Don Mucarade | Ernest Boulanger | Jules Barbier | 1875 | One-act comic opera |
| Lalla-Roukh | Félicien David | Hippolyte Lucas | 1862 | two-act comic opera |
| La guzla de l'Émir | Théodore Dubois | Jules Barbier | 1873 | 1-act comic opera |
| Quentin Durward | François-Auguste Gevaert | Eugène Cormon | 1858 | Three-act opera |
| Le médecin malgré lui | Charles Gounod | Jules Barbier | 1858 | Opéra comique in 3 acts |
| Faust | Charles Gounod | Jules Barbier | 1859 | Adapted from Carré's play Faust et Marguerite, loosely based on Goethe's Faust, Part I. Revised 1869 |
| Philémon et Baucis | Charles Gounod | Jules Barbier | 1860 | Based on Baucis and Philemon by Jean de La Fontaine (derived in turn from Ovid's Metamorphoses Book VIII) |
| La colombe | Charles Gounod | Jules Barbier | 1860 | Based on the poem Le Faucon by Jean de La Fontaine. |
| La reine de Saba | Charles Gounod | Jules Barbier | 1862 | From Gérard de Nerval's Le voyage en Orient. |
| Mireille | Charles Gounod | | 1864 | Libretto by Carré alone, based on Frédéric Mistral's poem Mireio. |
| Roméo et Juliette | Charles Gounod | Jules Barbier | 1867 | An adaptation of William Shakespeare's Romeo and Juliet |
| Polyeucte | Charles Gounod | Jules Barbier | 1868 | Based on Polyeucte by Pierre Corneille |
| Valentine d'Aubigny | Fromental Halévy | Jules Barbier | 1856 | Comic opera, 3 acts |
| Les pêcheurs de Catane | Aimé Maillart | Eugène Cormon | 1860 | Three-act lyric opera |
| Lara | Aimé Maillart | Eugène Cormon | 1864 | 3-act opera, based on Count Lara by Lord Byron |
| Galathée | Victor Massé | Jules Barbier | 1852 | Two-act opéra-comique |
| Les noces de Jeannette | Victor Massé | Jules Barbier | 1853 | One-act opéra-comique |
| Miss Fauvette | Victor Massé | Jules Barbier | 1855 | |
| Les saisons | Victor Massé | Jules Barbier | 1855 | Three-act opéra-comique |
| Paul et Virginie | Victor Massé | Jules Barbier | 1876 | Three-act opéra-comique |
| Fior d'Alizia | Victor Massé | Hippolyte Lucas | 1866 | |
| Dinorah | Giacomo Meyerbeer | Jules Barbier | 1859 | (Originally titled Le pardon de Ploërmel). Based on two tales by Émile Souvestre, La Chasse aux trésors and Le Kacouss de l'Armor |
| Deucalion et Pyrrhe | Alexandre Montfort | Jules Barbier | 1855 | One-act comic opera |
| The Marriage of Figaro | W. A. Mozart | Jules Barbier | 1858 | Translation into French for the Paris Théâtre Lyrique, ran for 200 performances |
| The Tales of Hoffmann | Jacques Offenbach | Jules Barbier (libretto & book) | 1881 | After a play by Barbier & Carré, Les contes fantastiques d'Hoffmann produced at the Odéon Theatre in Paris in 1851, based on stories by E.T.A. Hoffmann |
| La rose de Saint-Flour | Jacques Offenbach | | 1856 | Libretto by Carré alone, 1-act operetta |
| Le mariage aux lanternes | Jacques Offenbach | Léon Battu | 1857 | Opérette, 1 act, revised version of Le trésor à Mathurin) |
| La statue | Ernest Reyer | Jules Barbier | 1869? | Opera, 3 acts – piano score arranged by Georges Bizet |
| Le timbre d'argent | Camille Saint-Saëns | Jules Barbier | 1865 | Saint-Saëns' first opera, an 'opera fantastique'. Not premiered until February 1877. Dialogue re-composed as Grand Opera, premiered in 1913. |
| Gil Blas | Théophile Semet | Jules Barbier | 1860 | notes |
| Hamlet | Ambroise Thomas | Jules Barbier | 1868 | notes |
| Mignon | Ambroise Thomas | Jules Barbier | 1866 | Based on Goethe's novel Wilhelm Meister's Apprenticeship. Revised in 1870 |
| Psyché | Ambroise Thomas | Jules Barbier | 1860 | opéra-comique, 3.acts |

== Sources ==
- Christopher Smith: "Carré, Michel", Grove Music Online ed. L. Macy (Accessed 4 December 2005) (subscription required)
