= Jules Barbier =

French poet, writer and librettist (1825–1901)

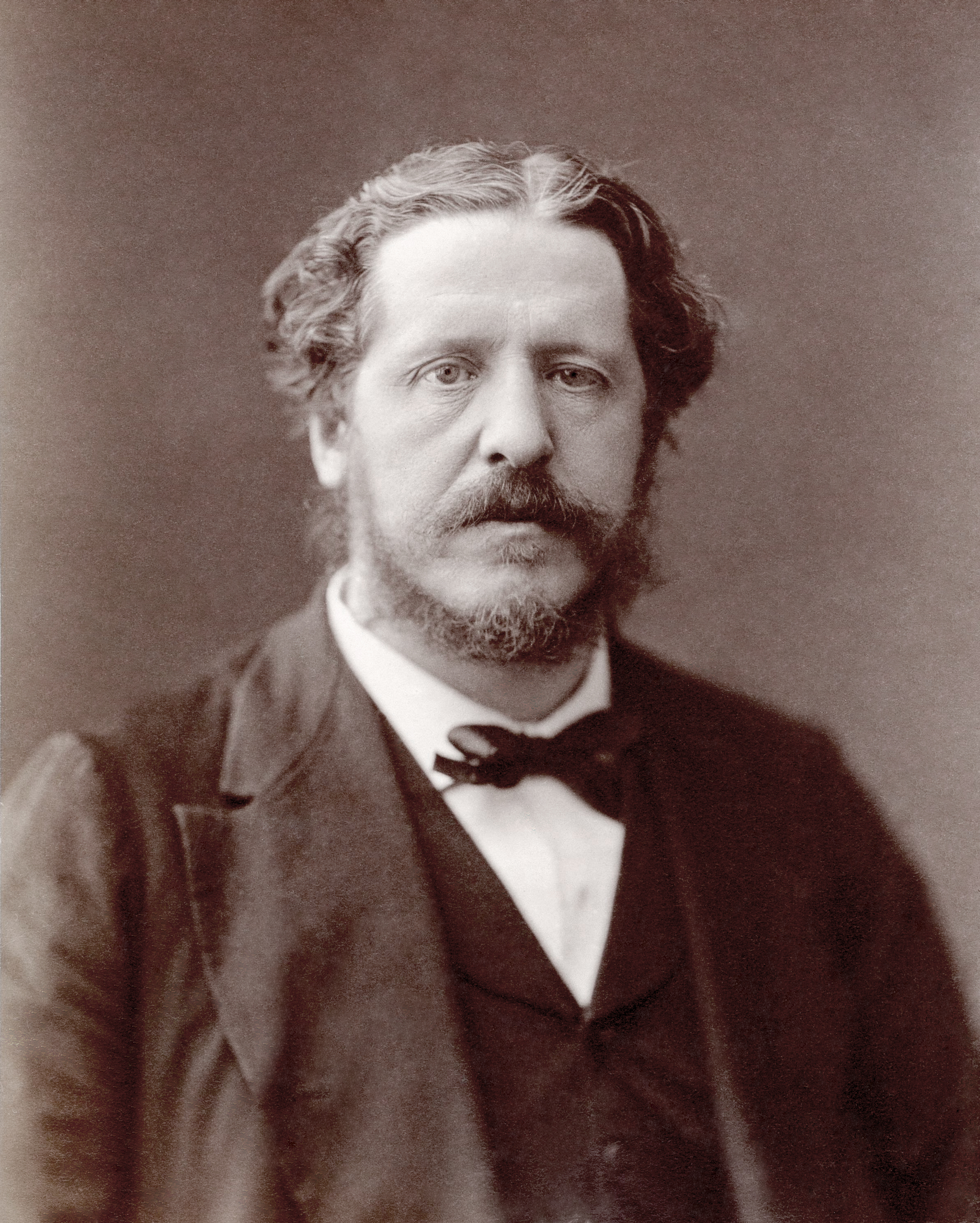
- Barbier c. 1880
- Born: 8 March 1825; Paris, France
- Died: 16 January 1901 (aged 75); Paris, France
- Occupation: Librettist
- Employer: Conservatoire de Paris

Paul Jules Barbier (French pronunciation: [pɔl ʒyl baʁbje]; 8 March 1825 – 16 January 1901) was a French poet, writer and opera librettist who often wrote in collaboration with Michel Carré.

== Works ==
His libretti for extant operas (those co-written with Carré are shown with an asterisk) include:

- Charles Gounod:
  - La Colombe, Faust (*), Le médecin malgré lui (*), Philémon et Baucis, Polyeucte, La reine de Saba and Roméo et Juliette (*)
- Victor Massé:
  - Galathée
  - Les Saisons (*)
- Giacomo Meyerbeer:
  - Le pardon de Ploërmel (later revised as Dinorah)
- Jacques Offenbach:
  - The Tales of Hoffmann
- Camille Saint-Saëns:
  - Le timbre d'argent
- Ambroise Thomas:
  - Hamlet (*), Mignon (*) and Françoise de Rimini (*).

He also wrote the libretto for La Guzla de l'Émir, a one-act comic opera by Georges Bizet. This was never performed and probably destroyed.

He wrote the scenario for Léo Delibes' ballet Sylvia. Charles Gounod wrote incidental music to Barbier's play Jeanne d'Arc, and the libretto to Pyotr Ilyich Tchaikovsky's opera The Maid of Orleans was partially based on it.

== See also ==
- Ballets by Jules Barbier
- Libretti by Jules Barbier
