= Roméo et Juliette =

1867 opera by Charles Gounod

- Opera by Charles Gounod
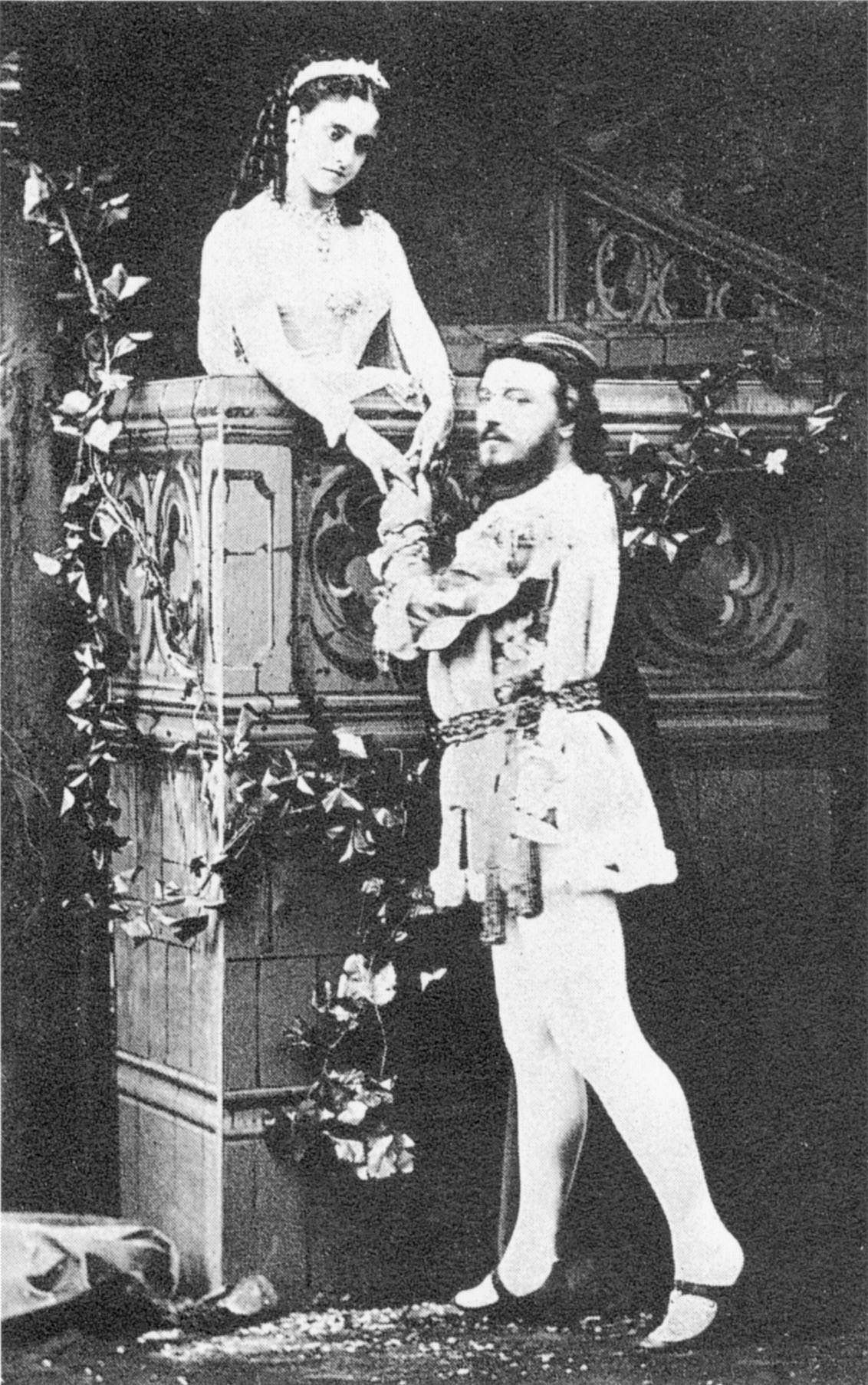
- Adelina Patti and Mario in the title roles, act 2 in a London production of 1867
- Librettist: Jules Barbier; Michel Carré
- Language: French
- Based on: Romeo and Juliet by Shakespeare
- Premiere: 27 April 1867; Théâtre Lyrique, Paris

Roméo et Juliette (French pronunciation: [ʁɔmeo e ʒyljɛt], Romeo and Juliet) is an opera in five acts by Charles Gounod to a French libretto by Jules Barbier and Michel Carré, based on Romeo and Juliet by William Shakespeare. It was first performed at the Théâtre Lyrique (Théâtre-Lyrique Impérial du Châtelet), Paris on 27 April 1867. This opera is notable for the series of four duets for the main characters and the waltz song "Je veux vivre" for the soprano.

== Performance history ==
Gounod's opera Faust had become popular at the Théâtre Lyrique since its premiere in 1859 (it was performed over 300 times between 1859 and 1868) and this led to a further commission from the director Léon Carvalho. Behind the scenes there were difficulties in casting the lead tenor, and Gounod was said to have composed the last act twice, but after the public general rehearsal and first night it was hailed as a major success for the composer. Its success was aided by the presence of dignitaries in Paris for the Exhibition, several of whom attended performances. A parody soon appeared at the Théâtre Déjazet, entitled Rhum et eau en juillet (Rum and Water in July).

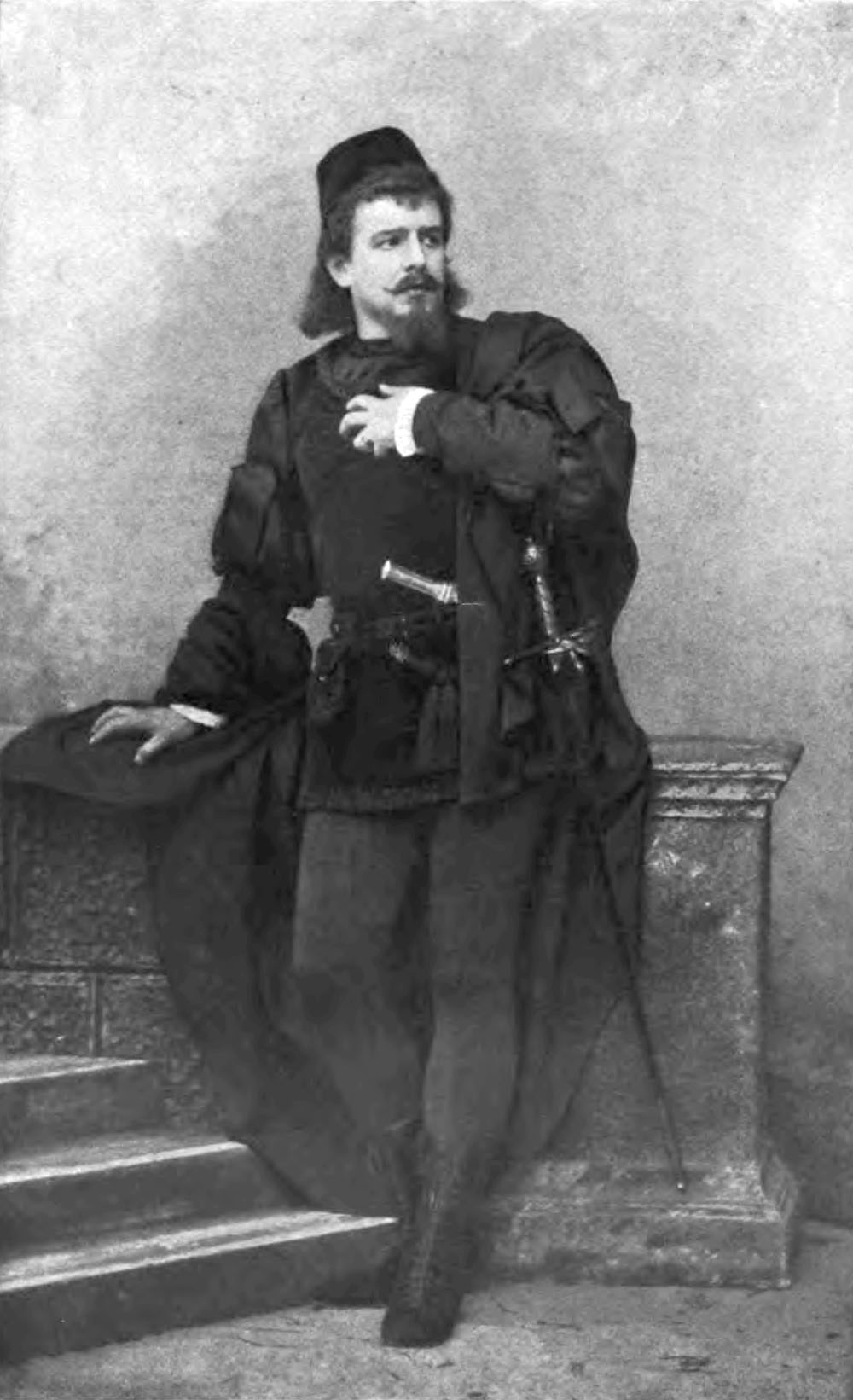
Jean de Reszke as Roméo (Paris, 1888)

The opera entered the repertoire of the Opéra-Comique on 20 January 1873 (with Deloffre and Carvalho returning to their roles from the premiere), where it received 391 performances in 14 years. On 28 November 1888 Roméo et Juliette transferred to the Paris Opéra, with Adelina Patti and Jean de Reszke in the leading roles, with sets by Jean-Baptiste Lavastre.

The opera was first seen internationally in London (with Patti and Mario) on 11 July 1867 and in New York (with Minnie Hauk) at the Academy of Music on 15 November of that year.

In 1912, the opera was recorded complete for the first time, with Agustarello Affre as Roméo, Yvonne Gall as Juliette, Henri Albers as Capulet and Marcel Journet as Laurent.

The opera is frequently staged by the world's opera houses.

== Critical reception ==
Sutherland Edwards, music critic of the St. James's Gazette, wrote the following about the opera following its first London performance in 1867:

Gounod's Roméo et Juliette, in which the composer is always pleasing, though seldom impressive, might be described as the powerful drama of Romeo and Juliet reduced to the proportions of an eclogue for Juliet and Romeo. One remembers the work as a series of very pretty duets, varied by a sparkling waltz air for Juliet, in which Madame Patti displays that tragic genius, which belongs to her equally, with the highest capacity for comedy. [Vaccai's] Romeo e Giulietta is an admirable opera for Giulietta; in which Romeo is not forgotten.

== Roles ==
Roles, voice types, premiere cast
Role	Voice type	Premiere cast, 27 April 1867 Conductor: Adolphe Deloffre
Roméo, son of Montague	tenor	Pierre-Jules Michot
Juliette, daughter of Capulet	soprano	Marie Caroline Miolan-Carvalho
Frère Laurent	bass	Jean Cazaux
Mercutio, Romeo's friend	baritone	Auguste-Armand Barré
Gertrude, Juliet's nurse	mezzo-soprano	Eléonore Ragaine-Duclos
Tybalt, Lady Capulet's nephew	tenor	Jules-Henri Puget
Benvolio, Montague's nephew	tenor	Pierre-Marie Laurent
Count Capulet	bass	Eugène Troy
Pâris, a young count	baritone	Laveissière
The Duke	bass	Émile Wartel
Grégorio, Capulet's servant	baritone	Étienne Troy
Frère Jean	bass	Neveu
Stéphano, Romeo's page	mezzo-soprano (trouser role)	Joséphine Daram
Male and female retainers and kinsmen of the Houses of Capulet and Montague, maskers

== Synopsis ==
The libretto follows the story of Shakespeare's play.

=== Act 1 ===
Overture prologue:

A short chorus sets the scene of the rival families in Verona.

A masked ball in the Capulets’ palace

Tybalt talks to Pâris about Juliette, who appears with her father. Roméo, Mercutio, Benvolio and their friends enter, disguised, and Mercutio sings a ballad about Queen Mab, after which Juliette sings a joyful waltz song. The first meeting between Roméo and Juliette takes place, and they fall in love. But Tybalt re-appears and suspects that the hastily re-masked Roméo is his rival. While Tybalt wants immediate revenge, Capulet orders that the ball continue.

=== Act 2 ===
The Capulets' garden

After Roméo's page Stephano has helped his master gain access, he reveals the two young lovers exchanging their vows of love.

=== Act 3 ===
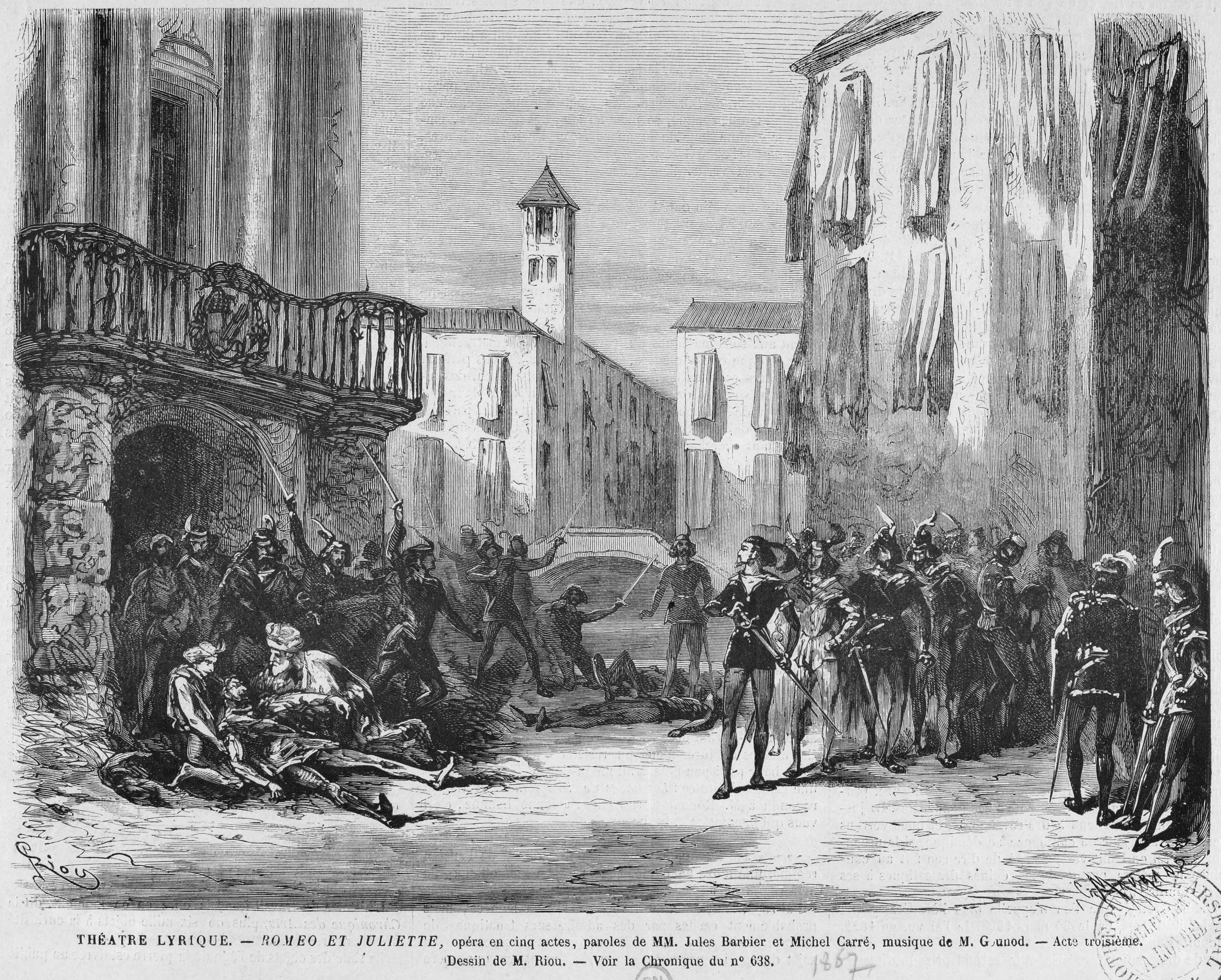
Press illustration of act 3, scene 2, as staged in the original production

Scene 1: Laurent's cell

Roméo and Juliette, accompanied by Gertrude, go to Father Laurent's cell, and he performs their marriage. Laurent hopes that their wedding will lead to a reconciliation between the houses of the Montagus and the Capulets.

Scene 2: a street near Capulet's palace

Stephano sings to attract the occupants into the street. Gregoire and Stephano skirmish as men from each family appear. The duel is first between Tybalt and Mercutio, who falls dead, and then between Roméo, determined to avenge his comrade, and Tybalt. Tybalt is killed by Roméo, who is banished by the Duke.

=== Act 4 ===
Juliet's room at dawn

Roméo and Juliette are together and, after a long duet, Roméo departs for exile. Juliette's father comes to remind her of Tybalt's dying wish for Juliette to marry Count Pâris. The friar gives Juliette a draught which will cause her to sleep, so as to appear as if dead. He tells her that, after she is laid in the family tomb, it is planned that Roméo will awaken her and take her away. [A ballet scene in the grand hall of the palace was inserted at this point.]

=== Act 5 ===
Juliet's tomb

Roméo breaks into the tomb after having taken poison because he believes that Juliette is dead. When she awakes from the friar's potion, the lovers' last duet is heard before the poison takes effect on Roméo. As her bridegroom weakens, Juliette stabs herself, to be united with her lover in death.
