= Victor Massé =

French composer

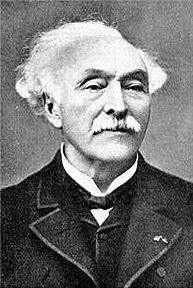
- Born: Félix Marie Massé; 7 March 1822; Lorient (Morbihan)
- Died: 5 July 1884 (aged 62); Paris
- Education: Paris Conservatoire
- Occupation: Composer

Victor Massé (French pronunciation: [viktɔʁ mase]; born Félix Marie Massé; 7 March 1822 – 5 July 1884) was a French composer.

== Biography ==
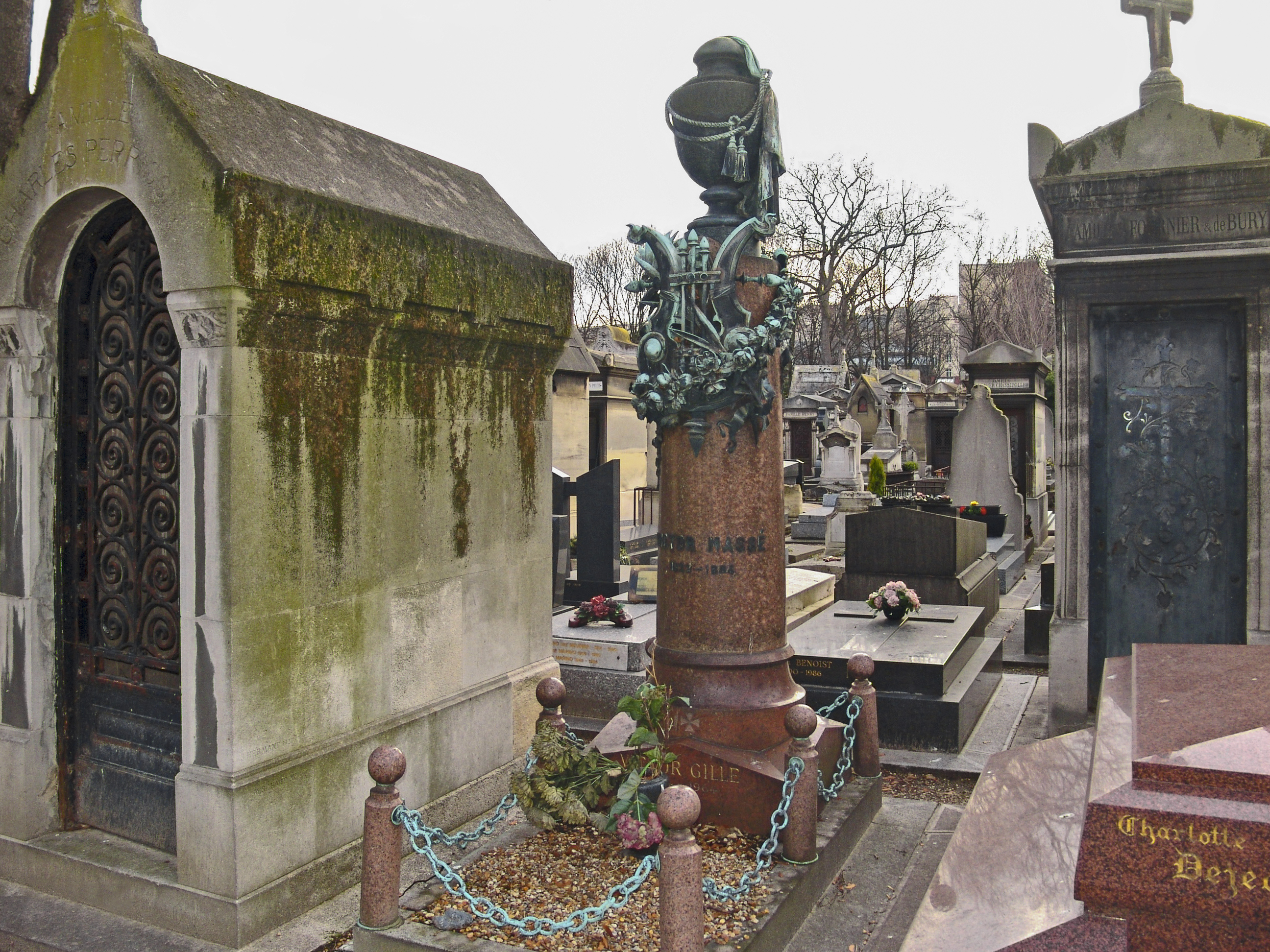
Grave of Victor Massé by Charles Garnier

Massé was born in Lorient (Morbihan) and studied at the Paris Conservatoire, winning the Prix de Rome in 1844 for his cantata Le Rénégat de Tanger before turning his attention to opera. While at the Conservatoire, Massé studied with Jaques Halévy. He wrote some twenty operas, including La Chanteuse voilée (1850), followed by the more ambitious Galathée (1852) and Paul et Virginie (1876). His best-known and most successful work was the opéra comique Les Noces de Jeannette (1853). His last work, Une Nuit de Cléopâtre, was performed posthumously in April 1885.

Massé died in Paris and is buried in Montmartre Cemetery. Rue Victor Massé in the 9th arrondissement of Paris is named after him.

== Operas ==
- La Chambre gothique, opéra (1849)
- La Chanteuse voilée (1850, text by Eugène Scribe and Adolphe de Leuven)
- Galathée (1852, text by Jules Barbier and Michel Carré))
- Les Noces de Jeannette, opéra comique (1853, text by J. Barbier and M. Carré)
- La Fiancée du diable (1854, text by Eugène Scribe and H. Romand)
- Miss Fauvette (1855, text by J. Barbier and M. Carré)
- Les Saisons (1855, text by J. Barbier and M. Carré)
- La Reine Topaze (1856, text by Lockroy and Battu)
- Les Chaises à porteurs (1858, text by Dumanoir and Clairville)
- La Fée Carabosse (1859, text by Lockroy and Frères Cogniard)
- La Mule de Pedro (1863, text by Dumanoir)
- Fior d'Aliza (1866, after Lamartine)
- Le Fils du brigadier (1867, text by Eugène Labiche and Delacour)
- Paul and Virginie (1876, text by J. Barbier and M. Carré)
- Une Nuit de Cléopâtre (1885, text by J. Barbier)

== See also ==
- The works of Antonin Mercié
