= List of compositions by Charles Gounod =

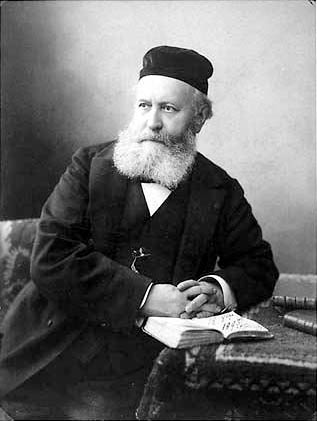
Charles Gounod by Nadar, ca. 1887

This is a list of musical compositions by the 19th-century French composer Charles Gounod (1818–1893), sorted by musical work category and date.

== Operas ==
- Sapho (Opera in 3 acts, premiered 16 April 1851 at Salle Le Peletier of the Paris Opera, revised to 2 acts on 26 July 1858, and revised again to 4 acts at the Palais Garnier on 2 April 1884). Libretto by Émile Augier after the life of the poet Sappho of Lesbos. The creation of the work was given an impetus by, and provided a central role for, the mezzo-soprano Pauline Viardot.
- La nonne sanglante (The Bloody Nun) (Opera in 5 acts, premiered 18 October 1854 at the Salle Le Peletier). The libretto was by Eugène Scribe and Germain Delavigne, after an episode in The Monk, a gothic novel by Matthew Gregory Lewis.
- Le médecin malgré lui (The Doctor in spite of himself) (Opéra comique in three acts, premiered at the Théâtre Lyrique on 15 January 1858). Libretto by Jules Barbier and Michel Carré after Molière's play of the same name.
- Faust (Opera in five acts, premiered at the Théâtre Lyrique on 19 March 1859; the opera was revised with a ballet being added and spoken dialogue replaced by sung recitative for performances at the Salle Le Peletier in 1869). The libretto was by Barbier and Carré, from Carré's play Faust et Marguerite, in turn loosely based on Johann Wolfgang von Goethe's Faust, Part One.
- Philémon et Baucis (Opera in three acts, first performed at the Théâtre Lyrique on 18 February 1860. Gounod revised this for a definitive 2-act version at the Opéra-Comique on 16 May 1876). Libretto by Barbier and Carré, after the tale of Baucis and Philemon as told by Jean de La Fontaine, derived in turn from Ovid's Metamorphoses.
- La colombe (The Dove) (Opéra comique premiered in a one-act version at the Theater der Stadt in Baden-Baden on 3 August 1860, revised on 7 June 1866 by the Opéra-Comique at the Salle Favart in Paris in an expanded two-act version). Libretto by Barbier and Carré based on the poem Le Faucon by La Fontaine.
- La reine de Saba (The Queen of Sheba) (Grand opera in four or five acts, premiered at the Salle Le Peletier by the Paris Opera on 28 February 1862. Libretto by Jules Barbier and Michel Carré inspired by Gérard de Nerval's La Reine de Saba, in his collection of travel writing, Le voyage en Orient.
- Mireille (Opera in five acts, premiered at the Théâtre Lyrique on 19 March 1864). Libretto by Michel Carré after Frédéric Mistral's poem Mirèio.
- Roméo et Juliette (Opera in five acts, first performed at the Théâtre Lyrique on 27 April 1867. A ballet was added for its transfer to the Paris Opera on 28 November 1888). Libretto by Jules Barbier and Michel Carré, based on the play Romeo and Juliet by William Shakespeare.
- Cinq-Mars (Opera in four acts, initially performed at the Opéra-Comique on 5 April 1877). Libretto by Paul Poirson and Louis Gallet loosely adapted from Alfred de Vigny's historical novel based on the life of Louis XIII's favourite the Marquis of Cinq-Mars, who conspired against Louis' First Minister, Cardinal Richelieu.
- Maître Pierre (Master Peter) (Uncompleted project for an opera started in 1877, abandoned in 1878. The music was later arranged by the composer as a Suite dramatique en quatre parties). The libretto was by Louis Gallet, after the life of Peter Abelard, the twelfth century scholar-philosopher and lover of Héloïse.
- Polyeucte (Opera in five acts. Originally intended for the Salle Le Peletier, the premiere was delayed when that theatre was destroyed by fire in 1873. The work eventually premiered in the new Palais Garnier on 7 October 1878). The libretto was by Jules Barbier and Michel Carré, after the play of the same name (1643) by Pierre Corneille, about Saint Polyeuctus, an early Roman martyr in Armenia.
- Le tribut de Zamora (Grand opera in four acts, premiere at the Paris Opera's Palais Garnier on 1 April 1881). The libretto by Adolphe d'Ennery and Jules Brésil was set in Moorish Spain shortly after the Battle of Zamora in 939 CE.

== Oratorios ==
- Messe a tre (1841)
- Tobie. Words by Lefèvre (1854)
  - Version in English by H. Farnie
- Les Sept Paroles de Notre Seigneur Jésus-Christ sur la Croix (1855)
- Gallia For solo soprano, chorus, orchestra, and organ (1871)
  - Versions:
1. For voice and piano. Arranged by Antony Choudens
2. For piano solo. Arranged by Antony
3. For voice, piano, organ, violin or violoncello. With French, Latin, Italian, and German words (1872)
- Jésus sur le lac de Tibériade (1873)
  - Version for voice and piano arranged by Léon Lemoine
- La rédemption, trilogy (1882)
  - Versions:
1. For voice and piano arranged by Berthold Tours
2. In English by J. Troutbeck
3. In German by J. Weyl
- Christus factus est (1842)
- Mors et vita, trilogy (1884)
  - Versions:
1. For voice and piano. Arranged by Brown (1885)
2. In English by J. Troutbeck
- Saint Francois d'Assise (1891)

== Ballet ==
- Faust (1868)
- Roméo et Juliette (1888)
- Souvenir d'un bal, air. For violin and piano (1896)

== Theatre ==
- "Dramatic pieces" (1841)
- "Fragments from Romeo e Giulietta (1842)
- "Sextet from Le cantatrici villane" (1842)
- Ulysse, incidental music (preludes, melodrames and choruses) for the five-act tragedy by François Ponsard (1851)
- Le Bourgeois gentilhomme, by Molière (1856)
- Les Deux Reines de France, drama by Ernest Legouvé (1865)
- Jeanne d'Arc, drama by Jules Barbier (1873)
- Georges Dandin, comedy by Molière (1873)
- Les drames sacrés, by Armand Sylvestre and Eugène Morand (1892)

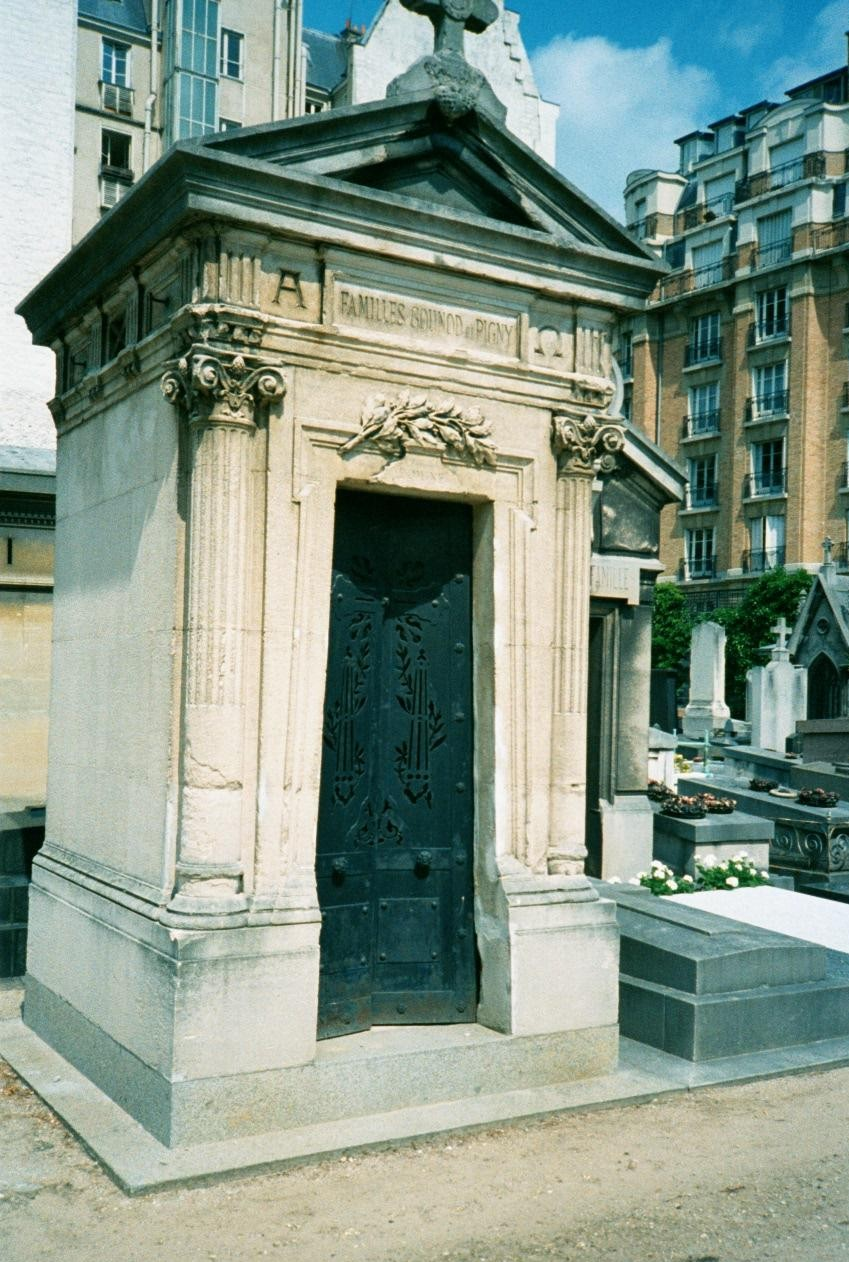
Charles Gounod's burial site (Auteuil, Paris, France)

== Masses ==
- Mass (1839)
- Mass (1840)
- Requiem (1842)
- Mass (1843)
- A son ami Gabriel de Vendeuvre. Two tenors and two basses (1846)
  - Version in German by J. André. With organ ad libitum
- A l'association des sociétés chorales de Paris et du departement de la Seine. For Four-part male choir and organ ad libitum (1846)
  - Version for 3 voices arranged by A. Lebeau. Messe des orphéonistes. (1870)
- Mass for 3-part male choir (1853)
  - Versions:
1. For 3-part male choir and organ (1863)
2. For 4 voices
- St. Cecilia Mass (Messe solennelle à Sainte-Cécile) ("A la mémoire de J. Zimmermann, mon père") (1855, revised 1864)
  - Versions:
1. For soli, chorus, orchestra, and organ
2. For soli, chorus, and organ. Orchestra reduction by E. Vast (1861)
3. For soli, chorus, and organ. Added second offertory (1873)
4. For soli, four-part chorus, and organ or piano. Added Laudate Dominum (1878)
5. For soli, two-part chorus, and organ or piano (1887)
6. The Kyrie, Sanctus, Benedictus, and Agnus Dei, for soli or chorus in unison with organ or piano accompaniment (1886)
7. With the organ replacing the wind instruments. To be played with a string quartet. Arranged by H. d'Aubel (1895)
- Messe brève en ut majeur. Three-part (soloists or male choir) and organ or harmonium (1872)
  - Version for four voices (male choir) and organ
- Messe brève pour les morts (1873)
- Messe du Sacré-Cœur de Jésus. Four-part. For chorus and orchestra (1876)
  - Versions:
1. For voice and piano. Arranged by A. Lavignac
2. For 2 voices and organ or harmonium. Arranged by Antony Choudens (1877)
3. For piano and organ. Arranged by Leon Lemoine (1878)
4. For 3 voices and organ
5. The office of holy communion. Translated by George F. Tredaway
- Messe No. 3. 3-part. With organ ad libitum (1882)
  - Versions:
1. In E♭ (from G)
2. For piano and voice. Arranged by Berthold Tours (1883)
- Messe funèbre à quatre voix. for soprano 1, soprano 2, tenor, bass, and organ (1883)
- A la mémoire de Jeanne d'Arc for soli, chorus, and organ (1887) [Plus a prelude with a fanfare and other pieces]
- Quatrième messe solennelle for chorus and organ (1888) [Preceded by a Te Deum]
- Aux cathédrales. Four-part. For soli, chorus, and organ or piano (1890)
- Messe brève no. 7 for four-part choir, soli, and organ or piano (1890)
- Messe dite de Clovis. Four-part. With organ (1890)
- Messe de Saint-Jean. Four-part. With organ (1890)
- Requiem for soli, chorus, and piano (1893)
  - Versions:
1. For soli, chorus, and organ
2. For 2 voices and organ
3. With an accompaniment of string quartet or harp and organ

== Motets ==
- Te deum (1841)
- Hymne en français For soli, chorus, and orchestra (1843)
- A la reine des apôtres. For soprano or baryton (1843, revised in 1846 as Chant pour le départ des missionnaires du séminaire des missions étrangères)
  - Versions:
    1. For soprano or tenor
    2. For 2 voices
    3. For chorus
- Chantons, chantons de Dieu le pouvoir éternel, by Handel. For chorus. (1843)
- Domine salvum (1853)
- Ave verum (1853)
- O salutaris (1854)
- Dans cette étable, pastorale sur un noël du XVIIIème siècle (1855–56)
- Bethléem, noël du XVIIIème siècle. With piano or organ (1855–56)
  - Version in English by Farnie
- The shepherd's nativity hymn (1855–56)
  - Version in English by Farnie
- Regina coeli; Laudate Dominum (1856)
- O salutaris; Inviolata, four-part (1856)
- Laudate Dominum, two-part (1856)
- O salutaris hostia, for solo soprano, chorus, and orchestra (1856)
- Ave verum de Mozart, four-part. For chorus (1856)
- Interlude and prayer for Joseph en Egypte by Méhul. For voice (1856)
- Ave verum, for solo bass or alto (1856)
  - Version for solo tenor or soprano
- Jésus de Nazareth, words by A. Porte (1856)
  - Versions:
    1. With piano or organ in G, C, and E♭ (1860–66)
    2. With orchestra (1864)
    3. In English by Henry Chorley (1862)
    4. For orchestra and chorus (1877)
- O salutaris eternel, for orchestra and organ or solo organ ad libitum (1856)
- Da pacem, antiphon. three-part (1856)
- Pater noster, four-part (1856)
- Inviolata, two-part (1856)
- Ave Maria. Words by Paul Besnard. For solo soprano, organ, piano, and orchestra (1859). Based on the first prelude (from BWV 846) of The Well-Tempered Clavier by Johann Sebastian Bach.
  - Versions:
    1. For solo alto or baritone and piano
    2. For solo soprano or tenor and piano
    3. For soprano or tenor, violin, organ, and piano
    4. For soprano, violin, organ, piano, and orchestra
    5. In English by Chorley
- Fixer ici ton sort (1859)
- Prière à Marie (1861)
- Près du fleuve étranger. Four-part. Words by A. Quételard (1861)
  - Versions:
    1. In English by Farnie (1866)
    2. As Ave verum. For chorus and orchestra
- Tout l'univers est plein de sa magnificence. Words by Racine (1861)
- Ave verum. Four-part (1861)
- Ave verum; O salutaris. With orchestra or organ (1861)
- Le vendredi-saint. six-part. Words by Alexis Badou (1866)
- Noël, chant des religieuses. Words by Jules Barbier. For female soli and chorus, with piano and organ ad libitum (1866)
  - Versions:
    1. In English by Webb (1869) (this work is performed by the Robert Mitchell Boys Choir in the 1947 film The Bishop's Wife)
    2. In English by Metzler (1889)
- Stabat mater. Words by M. Castaing. For orchestra (1867)
  - Version with piano and organ ad libitum
- Tota pulchra es. Two-part (1868)
- Sub tuum. Two-part (1868)
- Prière à la Vierge, Words by M. (1868)
- Le mois de Marie (1868)
- Le crucifix (1868)
  - Version in English by Webb (1869)
- Sicut cervus. Four-part (1868)
- Cantique pour l'adoration du Saint-Sacrement. Words by A. de Ségur (1868)
- Le ciel a visité la terre. Words by A. de Ségur (1868)
  - In English by Farnie (1877)
- Prière pour l'empereur et la famille impériale. Words by Baclen (1869)
- L'anniversaire des martys, 6 canticles. Words by C. Dallet. With piano or organ (1870)
- Ave verum (1871)
- There is a green hill far away. Words by C. F. Alexander (1871)
- Motet pour la fête de l'exaltation de la Sainte Croix. With piano, organ, and harmonium ad libitum (1871)
- De profundis, (1871)
- O salutaris. Two-part, for mezzo-soprano and tenor (1871)
- Angeli custodes (1872–73)
- Prière d'Abraham. Words by Jules Barbier (1872–73)
- O salutaris. For solo soprano or tenor (1872–73)
  - Version for alto or baryton (1875)
- Two Benedictus: A morning service. An evening service (1872–73)
- L'Ave Maria de l'enfant (no date)
- To God, we choir above. Words by P. Skelton (no date)
- Que sa volonté soit faite! With piano or organ ad libitum (1872)
- Cantique pour la première communion. Words by R. P. Dulong de Rosnay. With piano or harmonium (1872)
- Bienheureux le cœur sincère. 2-part. Words by Jules Barbier. For soprano and alto (1872)
- La salutation angélique. For voice and piano (1872)
- D'un cœur qui t'aime. Two-part. Words by Racine and Athalie. For soprano and alto (1872)
- Hymn to the holy virgin, canticle (1872)
  - In English by B. P. Wyatt Smith (1883)
- Le roi d'amour est mon pasteur, melody. Words by Paul Collin (1872)
  - In English by H. W. Baker (1884)
- Glory to thee my God, this night. Words by Bishop Ken (1872)
- Hymne à Saint-Augustin. 1-part. Words by M. Ribolet. For chorus and organ (1872)
- Forever with the Lord. Words by J. Montgomery (1872)
- Ce qu'il faut à mon âme, canticle. Words by Félix Sédillot (1872)
- Le nom de Marie, canticle. Words by A. de Ségur (1872)
  - Version in English by Farnie
- Requiem (1873)
- Temple, ouvre-toi. Words by Legouvé (1873)
  - Version in English by Westbrook
- Vexilla regis (1873)
- On the sea of Galilee. Words by Weldon. For solo, chorus, and orchestra. Arranged by E. Tinel (1873)
- Ave verum. For soprano or tenor, violin, organ, piano, harp, and contrabass ad libitum (1876) [Hymne à Sainte Cécile]
- 60 sacred songs. With organ or piano (1879)
- Miserere. Four-part, for soli, chorus, and organ ad libitum (1880)
- De profundis. For soli, chorus, and orchestra (1880)
  - Version for voice and piano
- L'hymne apostolique (1886)
- Quam dilecta tabernacula tua. For solo baryton (1886)
- Hymne de la patrie. Notre-Dame de France. Words by Georges Boyer (1886)
- Te Deum. For soli or small chorus, chorus, organ, and harp (1886)
- The holy vision. Words by Frederic E. Wheaterly (1886)
- 60 sacred songs (1887)
- La communion des saints. For soprano and chorus (1889)
- Ave Maria (1890)
- La contemplation de Saint François au pied de la croix and La mort de Saint François (1891)
- Second Ave Maria, meditation (1892) based on Bach's second prelude
- Je te rends grâce, ô Dieu d'amour, canticle. Four-part. Words by Paul Collin. For soli ad libitum, chorus and piano or organ (1892)
  - Version for voice and piano
- Toujours à toi, Seigneur, hymn. Four-part. Words by Paul Collin. For chorus (1892)
- Tantum ergo. With violin, cello, and organ (1892)
- Pater noster. Five-part. For soli, chorus, and organ (1892)
- Le jour de Noël, epilogue (1892)
- Christus factus est obediens, canticle (no date)
- Ave Maria (published 1894)
- Salve regina (published 1894)
- Adoro te supplex, hymn (published 1894)
  - Version in English by A. Phillips (published 1895)
- La prière de Jeanne d'Arc. Words by Jules Barbier (published 1894)
  - Version in Latin by Dourlent
- Agnus Dei, by Henri Busser. With organ and violin ad libitum (published 1895)
- Motet à Saint Jean l'evangéliste, epilogue (published 1895)
- Pater noster, by Henri Busser (published 1895)
- Sancta Maria, canticle. Words by Eucher (published 1895)
- Amen (published 1895)
- O salutaris (published 1897)
- Hymne à l'eucharistie, canticle. Words by E. Julliotte (published 1900)
- D'un cœur qui t'aime. Words by Racine. For soprano and alto (published 1900)
  - Version for organ as "Bethléem" (1891)

== Songs ==
- Marie Stuart and Rizzio, lyric scene (1837)
- La vendetta, lyric scene (1838)
- Fernand, lyric scenes. 3-part (1839)
- Le vallon, meditation. Words by A. de Lamartine (1840–42)
  - Version in English by L. H. F. du Terreaux
- Le soir (1840–42)
- "Un hymne français." For soli, chorus, and orchestra (1843)
- "Bach's 1st prelude." For violin, organ, and piano (1852)
  - Version for voice. Words by A. de Lamartine
- Quatre grands chœurs. For orchestra (1852–58)
- Chant des compagnons; Le vin des Gaulois et la danse de l'Épée (1852–58)
- Les pauvres du bon Dieu (1852–58)
- La chanson de Roland. Four-part. For men's voices (1852–58) ["Chœur de Grétry" from ''Guillaume Tell'']
- Chasse: Où sommes-nous? (1852–58)
- Vive l'Empereur! (1852–58)
- Hymne à la France (1852–58)
- La cigale et la fourmi (1852–58)
- Le corbeau et le renard (1852–58)
- Bonjour, bonsoir. 3-part. Words by Spenner. For chorus (1852–58)
- Le rosier blanc. Words by Spenner (1852–58)
- Patte de velours. Words by Spenner (1852–58)
- La jeune fille et la fauvette, melody. Words by La Chauvinière (1852–58)
- Cantate. Words by Turpin. For women's voices (1852–58)
- Un rêve (1852–58)
- La distribution des prix (1852–58)
- Paraissez, roi des rois (1852–58)
- Reine des cieux. Words by Turpin (1852–58)
- La géographie. Words by Turpin (1852–58)
- L'action de grâce. Words by Turpin (1852–58)
- Le catéchisme. Words by Turpin (1852–58)
- Le bénédicité. Words by Turpin (1852–58)
- Où voulez-vous aller? Words by M. Théophile Gautier. For piano and violin, or violoncello, or flute, or harmonium (1852–58). Dedicated to Alexis Dupont
  - Versions:
1. In English by W. J. Ryby (1878)
2. In English by O. Meredith (1882)
- Primavera, melody. Words by M. Théophile Gautier (1852–58)
- Marguerite, romance. Words by O. Pradere (1854–55)
- Chant de paix (1854–55)
- Les vacances. Words by L. Bigorie. (1854–55)
- Le jour des prix. Words by E. Scribe (1854–55)
- Le temps qui fuit et s'envole (1854–55)
- La prière et l'étude: L'emploi de la journée. Words by C. Turpin (1854–55)
- La récréation; L'ècriture; L'arithmétique. Words by C. Turpin (1854–55)
  - Version for duet for "L'ècriture" and "L'arithmétique"
- Fêtes des ècoles. 3-part. Words by A. Lefèvre. For chorus (1854–55)
  - Version for 4 voices
- L'hiver, by Lully. For chorus (1854–55)
- Chantons, chantons de Dieu le pouvoir éternel, by Handel. For chorus (1854–55)
- En ce doux asile, by Rameau. For chorus (1854–55)
- L'ange gardien. Four-part. Words by Quételard. For chorus (1854–55)
- Mon habit, by Béranger (1855)
- Six mélodies (1855)
- Deux vieux amis, scene. Words by Pierre Véron. For tenor and baryton (1855)
- Sérénade. Words by Victor Hugo. With piano, organ, and harmonium ad libitum (1855, revised 1864, 1866, and 1867)
- Les châteaux en Espagne. Words by Pierre Véron. For tenor and baryton (1855)
- L'âme de la morte. Words by Théodore de Banville (1860)
- L'âme d'un ange. Words by Théodore de Banville (1860) [Based on the Italian folk song "La rondinella"]
- Chanson de printemps. Words by Eugène Tourneux (1860)
- La jeune fille et la fauvette. Words by Edmond de La Chauviniere (1860)
- Dans cette étable, pastorale. For chorus and orchestra (1860) [Based on an 18th-century "noël"]
- Le Juif errant. Words by Béranger (1860)
- Six mélodies enfantines. With piano (1860)
- A une jeune Grecque, epitaph. Words by Prosper Yvaren, from the Greek words by Sappho (1860)
- Medjé, Arab song. Words by Jules Barbier (1865)
- Solitude. Words by A. de Lamartine (1865)
- Tombez mes ailes, romance. Words by Ernest Legouve (1865)
- Stances. Words by Louise Bertin (1865)
- Crépuscule. Words by M. (1865)
- Un rève. Words by M. Spenner. Arranged with piano by F. Morand (1865)
- Au printemps. Words by J. Barbier (1865)
- Le vendredi-saint. 6-part. Words by Alexis Bardou. For chorus and piano (1865)
- A une bourse. Words by Émile Augier (1865)
- A une jeune fille. Words by Émile Augier (1865)
- Les pauvres du bon Dieu Words by M. Lebeau. Arranged by F. Morand (1865)
  - Version with words by Baelen [Hommage to countess Herminie de Leautaud's recently born son]
- Envoi de fleurs. Words by Émile Augier (1865)
- Donne-moi cette fleur. Words by Léon Gozlan (1865)
- Départ, scene. Words by Émile Augier (1865)
- Déesse ou femme, madrigal. Words by Barbier and Carré (1865)
- Boire à l'ombre. Words by Émile Augier (1865)
  - Version in English by A. Phillips
- Le temple de l'harmonie, 12 choruses and a cantata. For voice and piano (1865)
- Les martyrs, scene. For men's chorus (1869)
- "20 melodies." For voice and piano (1869)
- Absence. Words by A. de Ségur (1870)
- Chantez Noël 2-part. Words by Jules Barbier. For soprano and alto (1870)
- La cigale et la fourmi. For chorus (1870)
- Le corbeau et le renard. For chorus (1870)
- Je ne puis espérer. Words by Albert Delpit (1870)
- Chantez, voix bénies, hymn. Words by Louis Gallet (1870)
  - Versions:
1. In Italian by Zaffira (1872)
2. In English by C. J. Rowe
- Par une belle nuit, nocturne. 2-part. Words by A. de Ségur. For soprano and alto (1870)
- La paquerette. Words by Alexandre Dumas (1871)
- Chanter et souffir. Words by Albert Delpit (1871)
- Mignon. Words by Louis Gallet (1871)
- Le souvenir. Words by Joseph Collin (1871)
- Oh! that we two are maying. Words by Charles Kingsley. With harmonium and viola ad libitum (1871)
- The sea hath its pearls. With harmonium and violin ad libitum (1871)
- Beware: I know a maiden. Words by Henry Wadsworth Longfellow (1871)
- Queen of love. Words by Francis Turner Palgrave (1871)
- La siesta, duet (1871)
- The daisy. Words by Henry Dulcken, from the French words by A. Dumas (1871)
- Boléro. Words by Jules Barbier (1871)
  - Version in English by B. Kett
- Good night. Words by Shelley (1871)
- It is not always May. Words by Henry Wadsworth Longfellow (1871)
- Oh, happy home! Oh, blessed flower! Words by E. Maitland (1871–72)
- The fountains mingle with the river. Words by Shelley (1871–72)
- There is dew. Words by Thomas Hood (1871–72)
- Woes me! Woes me! Words by Campbell (1871–72)
- The Royal Albert Hall. For chorus (1871–72)
- Le pays bien heureux: Question d'enfant. (1871–72) [From "The better land" by Felicie Hemans]
- Perche piangi? Cantilena. Words by Corrade Marchese Pavesi (1871–72)
- Prière du soir. Words by C. Ligny (1871–72)
  - Version in English by Webb (1869)
- Quanti mai. Words by Jules Barbier, from Metastasio (1871–72)
- Si vous n'ouvrez votre fenêtre. Words by A. Dumas (1871–72)
- Biondina, in 12 numbers. Words by Giuseppe Zaffira (1871–72)
- Heureux sera le jour. Words by Ronsard. H. Lemoine (1871–72)
- La fauvette. Words by Millevoye (1871–72)
- La fleur du foyer. Words by Charles Ligny and E. Maitland (1871–72)
- Oh! dille tu! madrigal. Words by Giuseppe Zaffira (1871–72)
- Chanson d'avril, serenade by Passant and François Coppée (1872)
- Chanson de la brise, duo. Words by C. Ligny (1872)
- Maid of Athens. Virgine d'Atene/Vierge d'Athène. Words by Lord Byron (1872)
  - Versions:
1. In French by J. Ruelle
2. In Italian by A. Zanardini
- The message of the breeze, duet (1872)
- Ma belle amie est morte, lamento. Words by Théophile Gautier (1872)
- Little Celandine. Words by C. Ligny. For soprano and alto (1872)
- Barcarola Words by Giuseppe Zaffira. For soprano and baryton (1872–73)
  - Version in French by Jules Barbier
- Blessed is the man (1872–73)
- Chidiock Tichborne (1872–73)
- Ella è malaia (1872–73)
- E le campane hanno suonato (1872–73)
- Entreat me not to leave thee (1872–73)
- E stati, alquanto (1872–73)
- Ha qualche tempo (1872–73)
- L'ho accompagnata (1872–73)
- There is dew. Words by Thomas Hood (1872–73)
- Ho messo nuove corde al mandolino (1872–73)
- Ier fu mandata (1872–73)
- If thou art sleeping, maiden, awake. Words by Henry Wadsworth Longfellow (1872–73)
- Invocation. Words by O. Pradère (1872–73)
- Le labbra ella compose (1872–73)
- Loin du pays (1873)
- Roy's wife of Aldivalloch (1873)
- My beloved spake (1873)
- The Worker. Words by Frederick Weatherley (1873)
- L'ouvrier, lyric scene. Words by Charles Ligny and Frederick Weatherley (1873)
- Peacefully slumber (1873)
- Prière du soir. Words by Eugène Manucl (1873)
- Comeio son poeta (1873)
- Siam iti l'altro giorno (1873)
- Sotto un cappello rosa (1873)
- Welcome to skye (1873)
- Stances à la mémoire de Livingstone. Words by Lord Houghton (1873)
- Sur la montagne. Words by Jules Barbier (1874)
- A la Madone. Words by Jules Barbier (1874)
- Aimons-nous. Words by Jules Barbier (1874)
- A la brise. Madrigal. Words by Jules Barbier (1875)
- Clos ta paupière. Berceuse. Words by Jules Barbier (1875)
- En avant, military song. Words by Paul Déroulède. For solo, chorus, and piano 4 hands (1875)
- Mon amour a mon cœur. Words by Jules Barbier (1875)
- Viens, les gazons sont verts. Words by Jules Barbier (1875)
- Cantate, in 5 movements. Four-part. With organ (1875)
- Cantate pour la fête du T.-C. Frère Libanos (Note: Frère Libanos was the director of the Pensionnat des Frères des écoles chrétiennes à Passy.) (1876). For 4 singers and piano.
- Prend garde. Words by Jules Barbier (1876)
- Prière. Words by Sully-Prudhomme (1876)
- Compliment. Words by A. Dumas (1876)
- Les lilas blancs, waltz. Words by Paul Bourguignat (1876)
- Ma fille, souviens-toi. Words by Louise-Marie B. (1876)
- A toi, mon cœur! Words by Jules Barbier (1876)
- Les jeunes Françaises, duet. Words by E. Iegollvé (1876)
- L'absent (1876)
- "20 Mélodies." For soprano or tenor and piano (1877)
  - Version for alto or bass and piano
- Vive la France! Words by P. Déroulède. Orchestrated by A. Wormser (1877)
  - Version for solo and chorus
- La chanson du patre (1878)
- Le départ du mousse, barcarolle. Words by Pierre Barbier (1878)
- La reine du matin. Words by Jules Barbier and M. Carré (1878)
- Rêverie. Words by Jules Barbier (1878)
- Jesus à la crèche, "Noël" (1878)
- "15 children's melodies." With piano (1878)
- Mélancolie, rêverie. Words by François Coppée (1879–80)
- Les châteaux en Espagne. Words by Pierre Véron. For tenor and baryton (1881)
- Tu m'aimes: Réponse de Medjé. Words by Marie Barbier (1882)
- Elle sait. Words by Georges Boyer (1882)
- Ce que je suis sans toi. Words by M. de Peyre (1882)
- Chant des sauveteurs bretons. Words by Anais Ségalas (1882)
- Pauvre Braga, charmant garçon! Words by G. Nadaud (1882)
- La chanson de la glu, by J. Richepin (1883)
- Déjà l'aube matinale, duo (1883)
- Dernières volontés. Words by Louis Veuillot (1883)
- Les deux pigeons. Words by La Fontaine (1883)
- Memorare. For soprano and alto (1883)
- Voguons sur les flots, barcarolle (1883)
- "14 big choruses." Four-part. With piano (1883)
- A Cécile. Words by G. Dubufe (1883)
- Quand l'enfant prie. Words by Georges Boyer (1883)
- La couronne des reines. Words by D'ennery and Brésil (1885)
- Les adieux à la maison (1885)
- Blessures. Words by Henri Turpin (1885)
- Voix d'Alsace-Lorraine. Words by R. Rousseil (1885)
- Le temps des roses. Words by Camille Roy (1885)
  - Versions:
1. In Italian by A. Zanardini
2. In English by Germaine Mellor (1888)
- Aria di camera, pastoral by Johann Adolph Hasse (1886)
  - Versions:
1. In French by E. Vergin [Also: E. Colonne]. With piano
2. With orchestra
- Dieu partout. 2-part. Words by E. Plouvier (1886)
- Le travail béni. 2-part. Words by E. Plouvier (1886)
- La fête des couronnes. 2-part. Words by E. Plouvier (1886)
- "Six choruses" (1886)
- Le temps qui fuit (1887)
- Ce qu'il faut à mon ame, canticle. Words by Félix Sédillot (1887)
- Vincenette. Words by Pierre Barbier (1887)
- Gliding, down the river, boat song. Words by H. B. Farnie (1887)
- Passiflora. Words by Jeanne de Chambrun (1888)
- Hymne à la nuit. Words by Jules Barbier (1889)
- Aubade à la fiancee. Words by A. Dennery and J. Brésil (1890)
- "20 mélodies." For voice and piano (1890)
- A la nuit (1891)
- L'absent (1892)
- Tout l'univers obéit a l'amour. Words by La Fontaine (1893)
- Blanche Colombe; A la Madone; A ma sœur; Parlez pour moi, romances (no date) [From the collection L'âge d'or]
- Au rossignol. Words by A. de Lamartine (no date)
- La liberté éclairant le monde. 3-part. Words by E. Guiard (published 1894)
- L'aveu. Words by Jean Rameau (published 1894)
- "3 songs." (published 1895)
1. "Tranquil night" ["Night resplendent" from Cinq-Mars]
2. "Love in Arcadia"
3. "Image so dear"
- Repentir ("O Divine Redeemer"), for mezzo-soprano (published 1894)
- When the children pray. Words by O. Thospe. With violin and harmonium by H. Kingswill (published 1894)
- Célèbre sérénade, berceuse. 2-part. Words by V. du Fresnel. For 2 voices or chorus (published 1895)
- Le beau. Words by Jules Barbier (published 1895)
- La chanson du pécheur. Words by Théophile Gautier (published 1895)
- Souvenir d'un bal (published 1895)
- Soir d'automne (published 1896)
- Easter eve. Words by C. Armstrong (published 1897)
- Óyeme. Words by Sully-Prudhomme, from Spanish words by El Marqués de Alta Villa (published 1898)

== Instrumental ==
- "Fugues" (1837–39)
- "Scherzo" (1837)
- "Marche militaire suisse" (1840–41)
- "Quintette" (1840–41)
- "Plusieurs petits morceaux" (1840–41)
- "Canon" (1843)
- "Instrumental piece" (1843)
- "Méditation." For violin, piano, and organ (1852) [Based on Bach's first prelude]
  - Version for piano solo
- "Valse" (1854)
- La jeune religieuse, by Schubert. For piano, violin, violoncello ad libitum, and Debain harmonicorde (1856)
- "Quintette de Cosi fan tutte," by Mozart. For violin, violoncello, organ, and piano (1856)
- Symphonie No. 1. For orchestra (1855)
  - Versions:
1. For piano 4 hands. Arranged by Georges Bizet
2. For piano 2 hands. Arranged by A. Goria (1856)
- Symphonie No. 2. For orchestra (1855)
  - Version for piano 2 hands. Arranged by Antony Choudens (1866)
- "Communion." For organ (1858)
- "Overture from the opera Le medecin malgré lui." For piano 2 hands (1858)
- L'angelus, menuet. For piano 4 hands (1858)
  - Version for easy piano
- "Valse caractéristique." For piano 2 hands (1860)
  - Version for piano 4 hands
- "Meditation on Faust. For piano, violin, vlc., and organ (1862)
- La pervenche, romance (1861)
- Le ruisseau, romance (1861)
- Musette: Les pifferari, impromptu. For piano (1861)
- Royal-Menuet. For piano (1863)
- "Rêverie arabe" from La reine de Saba. For piano or organ, violin, and vlc. (1863)
- "Serenade." For piano, violin, and vlc. (1863)
  - Versions:
1. For piano and organ
2. For piano
3. For easy piano
- Le bal d'enfants. For easy piano (1864)
- "Le berger de la crau" from Mireille. For piano (1864)
  - Versions:
1. For easy piano
2. For organ
- "Choeur des magnanarelles" from Mireille (1864)
- "Valse-ariette" from Mireille (1864)
- "Heureux petit berger" from Mireille. For piano (1864)
- Hymne a Sainte-Cécile. For violin, organ, and piano (1864)
  - Version for violin, harps, timpani, wind instruments, and contrabasses (1865)
- Georgina. For piano (1864)
- "6 melodies." For piano (1864)
- "8 melodies." For piano (1864)
1. "Les champs"
2. "Chant du guerrier"
3. "Le vallon"
4. "Le Juif errant"
5. "Visions de Faust"
6. ?
7. "L'ame d'un ange"
8. "Le chant d'Euryclée"
- Aubade; Chant d'automne; Le lever, O ma belle rebelle; Le premier jour de mai; Venise. For easy piano (1864)
- "Marche nuptiale" (1864)
- Le Soir, romance (1864)
- Le Calme, romance (1864)
- Chant des compagnons, For orchestra (1865)
- Valse des fiancés: Souvenances, nocturne. For piano (1865)
- La chanson du printemps, romance (1866)
- Marche pontificale (1869)
- "Variety of chorales by J. S. Bach." For organ (1869–70)
- La melodia, romanza. For organ (1871)
- Ivy: Le lierre, For piano (1871)
- Saltarello. For orchestra (1871)
- "Marche romaine" (1872)
- Dodelinette. lullaby. For piano (1873)
- Marche funèbre d'une marionnette For piano (1873). Orchestrated 1879. [Published with narrative in 1882 with words by George Price and Jean Ker Mary]
- Maid of Athens. For piano (1873)
- Peacefully slumber, lullaby. For violin and piano (1873)
- Offertorium. For organ (1873)
- La veneziana. For piano (1873)
- La fête de Jupiter, march. For piano (1877–85)
- Sarabande de Cinq-Mars. For piano (1877–85)
- Cinq-Mars, march. For organ and hp. (1877–85)
  - Version for piano 4 hands
- "Invocation; Prélude." For piano (1877–85)
- "Pastorale; Sérénade." For piano (1877–85)
- "Marche-fanfare." For piano (1877–85)
- "Marche religieuse." For orchestra (1877–85)
- "Grand waltz" (1877–85)
- "Meditation." For piano (1877–85)
- "Overture from Cinq-Mars" For piano 4 hands (1877–85)
  - Version for piano 2 hands
- "Saltarelle; Marche religieuse." For piano 2 hands (1877–85)
  - Version for piano 4 hands
- Cinq-Mars, fantasy. For piano and violin (1877–85)
- "Marche solennelle." For piano (1877–85)
  - Version for harmonium and piano
- "3 small and easy pieces." For piano 4 hands (1879)
1. "La nacelle"
2. "La rosière"
3. "Le page"
- "Valse caractéristique." For piano (1881)
- "Wedding march No. 1." For piano (1881)
  - Version for organ and 3 trb. (1882)
- "Wedding march No. 2." For piano (1882)
- "Petite etude-scherzo." For 2 cb. (1877–85)
- "Meditation on the song The arrow and the song." For piano, violin or tpt., vlc., and organ (1877–85)
- Le rendez-vous, valses. For piano and orchestra (1877–85)
- Passacaille, serenade by Jacques Bosch. For guitar and violin ad libitum (1877–85)
- Fantaisie sur l'hymne national russe. For pedal piano and orchestra (1886)
- Suite concertante. For pedal piano and orchestra (1888)
  - Versions:
1. No. 3. For 2 piano Arranged by Camille Saint-Saëns and A. Leduc
2. No. 5. For piano 2 hands. Arranged by G. Pierné (1889)
3. No. 5. For piano 4 hands. Arranged by C. de Bériot (1889)
- "Petite symphonie." fl., 2 ob., 2 cl., 2 hn., and 2 bsn. (1888)
- Concerto in E-flat major. For pedal piano and orchestra (1889)
- Tempo di marcia (1893) [Incomplete; only 8 measures]
- "Preparatory preludes and fugues for Bach's The Well-Tempered Clavier. (published 1895)
- "Quartet." For 2 violin, vla., and vlc. (published 1895)
- "Scherzo." For piano (published 1896)
- Album for the pianoforte. Revised, phrased, and fingered by O. Thürner (published 1906)
- "6 pieces." For piano (published 1907)
- "6 string quartets." (published 1993)
