= Amélie Faivre =

French mezzo-soprano (1837–1897)

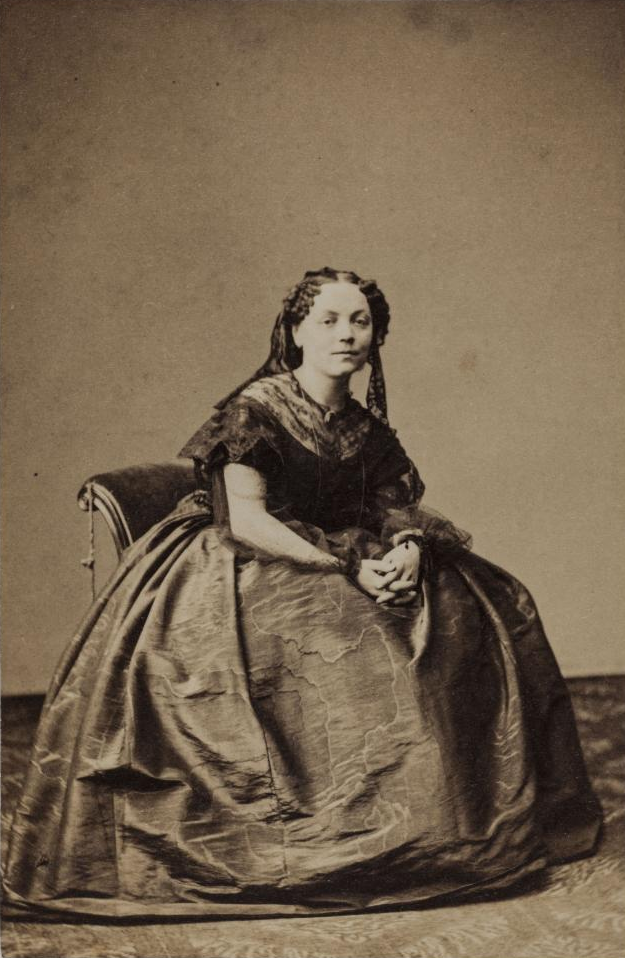
Image of Amélie Faivre

Louise Marie Amélie Faivre (4 February 1837 - 17 November 1897) was a French mezzo-soprano.

Born in Paris, the daughter of François-Théodore Faivre (1799-1861), a trombonist with the Théâtre-Italien, and Julie-Coralie Bolot (1814-1883), Faivre studied at the Conservatoire de Paris, where in 1857 she received third prize in singing and second in the field of opéra-comique. A career singer at the Théâtre Lyrique, at which she debuted in 1857 in Euryanthe by Carl Maria von Weber, she ultimately rose to become principal dugazon of that company, for which she created a number of roles. Most notably, in 1859, she was the first Siébel in Faust by Charles Gounod; other roles which she created for the company included parts in Le moulin du roi, by Adrien Boieldieu; La colombe, by Gounod; Les deux amours, by François-Auguste Gevaert; Erostate, by Ernest Reyer; and La fille de l'orfèvre, by Edmond Membrée. For la Monnaie she was the first Fatima in Oberon by Weber. She was the first to perform La mort de Socrate by Pierre-Edmond Hocmelle; she also created parts in Le valet-poète, by Raoul de Lostanges, and Le tricorne enchanté, by Léon Jouret. Faivre was the sister of Marie Faivre, also a singer. With her husband, Charles Réty, she was the mother of Marie Madeleine Emilie Réty, known as Bernerette Gandrey, a singer as well. Faivre died at home in the 17th arrondissement of Paris, and was buried at Père Lachaise Cemetery.
