= Tobie =

1854 oratorio by Charles Gounod

Tobie is an oratorio by Charles Gounod to words by Lefèvre from 1854.

== Recordings ==
- Paris Sorbonne Chorus, Paris Sorbonne Orchestra, Jacques Grimbert 1995
