= Le médecin malgré lui (opera) =

Opéra comique by Charles Gounod

Le médecin malgré lui, libretto, 1858

Le médecin malgré lui (The Doctor in spite of himself; sometimes also called The Mock Doctor) is an opéra comique in three acts by Charles Gounod to a libretto by Jules Barbier and Michel Carré after Molière's play of the same name. The work premiered at the Théâtre Lyrique in Paris on 15 January 1858.

== Performance history ==
As the work uses spoken dialogue and verse taken directly from Molière's play, the Comédie-Française tried unsuccessfully to block performance of the opera. It was revived at the Opéra-Comique in 1872, 1886, 1902 and 1938; was seen in Hamburg, Stockholm and Warsaw in 1862; and in England between 1865 and 1891. On 25 November 1978 the opera received its 100th performance at the Opéra-Comique, conducted by Sylvain Cambreling and with Jean-Philippe Lafont, Jocelyne Taillon and Jules Bastin among the cast.

In June 1923, Sergei Diaghilev commissioned Erik Satie to compose recitatives to replace the spoken dialogue. According to one assessment of the stylistic relationship between Satie's contribution and the recitatives Gounod wrote for other operas is that "the harmonic paths, smoothly consequential in Gounod's recitatives, are more nervous and sharp-cornered in those of Satie" who creates "musical situations that are unmistakably personal". The Satie recitatives premiered in Monte Carlo on 5 January 1924.

The opera has been rarely performed in recent years, although there have been radio broadcasts: from the BBC in the 1950s and French radio in the 1970s. Yale Opera, in a partnership with the Beinecke Rare Book & Manuscript Library and the Yale French Department, performed the piece with the Satie recitatives in April 2004 in New Haven, Connecticut. Utopia Opera in New York City performed the work in French with English supertitles in March 2013 and February 2014. Still given from time to time in the French provinces, the Grand Théâtre de Genève mounted a production by Laurent Pelly in April 2016.

== Roles ==
Roles, voice types, premiere cast
Role	Voice type	Premiere cast 15 January 1858 Conductor: Adolphe Deloffre
Sganarelle, a woodcutter ('fagotier')	baritone	Auguste Meillet
Léandre, Lucinde's lover	tenor	Fromont
Martine, Sganarelle's wife	mezzo-soprano	Amélie Faivre
Jacqueline, Lucas' wife	mezzo-soprano	Caroline Girard
Lucinde, Géronte's daughter	soprano	Esther Caye
Géronte, a wealthy bourgeois	bass	Lesage
Valère, Géronte's valet	baritone	Émile Wartel
Lucas, Géronte's servant	tenor	Adolphe Girardot
Monsieur Robert	actor	Ernest Leroy
Woodcutters, musicians, peasants	chorus	

== Synopsis ==
Place: Rural France
Time: the 17th century

Overture

=== Act 1 ===
In a forest

Sganarelle is a drunken wood-cutter who ill-treats his wife (duet "Non, je te dis que je n'en veux rien faire"). She is waiting for a chance for revenge (couplet "Toute femme tient"), when Valère and Lucas, servants of wealthy Géronte, present themselves in search of a doctor for Géronte's daughter, Lucinde who is feigning dumbness in order to avoid an unpalatable marriage.

Martine, Sganarelle's wife tells Valère and Lucas that her husband is a learned doctor, but will refuse to practise his art unless he is given a thrashing. They find the oblivious wood-cutter drinking (couplet "Qu'ils sont doux"), and force him (trio "Monsieur n'est ce pas"), by blows to admit his imputed profession and go with them (chorus "Nous faisons tous").

=== Act 2 ===
A room in Géronte's house

In the entr'acte, Léandre sings a serenade for Lucinde (Sérénade "Est-on sage"). Géronte complains to Lucinde's nurse Jacqueline's that he has got a rich husband in line for Lucinde as Léandre is too poor (couplet "D'un bout du monde"). Sganarelle puts on an act as a doctor with nonsense words and false treatments (sextet "Eh bien, charmante demoiselle"; finale "Sans nous").

=== Act 3 ===
Entr'acte: Géronte's house

(Air "Vive la médicine") After Sganarelle has been introduced to the "patient" Lucinde, her lover Léandre obtains an interview with him, and under the disguise of an apothecary, arranges an elopement with Lucinde while the mock doctor distracts the father (scene and chorus "Sarviteur Monsieur le Docteur").

(Change of scenery) Sganarelle and Jacqueline flirt (duo "Ah! que j'en suis, belle nourrice"). When the mock doctor and his apothecary return, Lucinde sees her lover and instantly regains the power of speech. (quintet "Rien n'est capable") Géronte's fury is so great he is about to call for justice and to have Sganarelle hanged, when Léandre announces his father-in-law that he has just inherited a large property from an uncle. Géronte's objection to Léandre (his poverty) is thus overcome, Sganarelle is saved from punishment, Martine claims the credit for her husband's social elevation – and Sganarelle forgives her (finale).

== Musical style and reputation ==
The light, non-sentimental style of the music in Le médecin malgré lui has attracted many musicians and critics, including Berlioz. "Gounod is at his best... – an elegant musician, with a charming lyrical gift, a genuine instinct for what may be called 'chamber' drama, and a discreet and well-balanced sense of the orchestra".

Alongside his distinctive feel throughout for French prosody, the sextet from act 2 has been noted for its use of song and melodrame where Sganarelle has to diagnose Lucinde's muteness; Gounod also manages pastiches of earlier styles in the march that closes act 2 and Léandre's serenade.

== Other operas based on the same play ==
By: Désaugiers (1792), Haibel (1841), Ferdinand Poise (1887, never performed)
