= D'un cœur qui t'aime =

1851 sacred motet by Gounod

- Motet by Charles Gounod
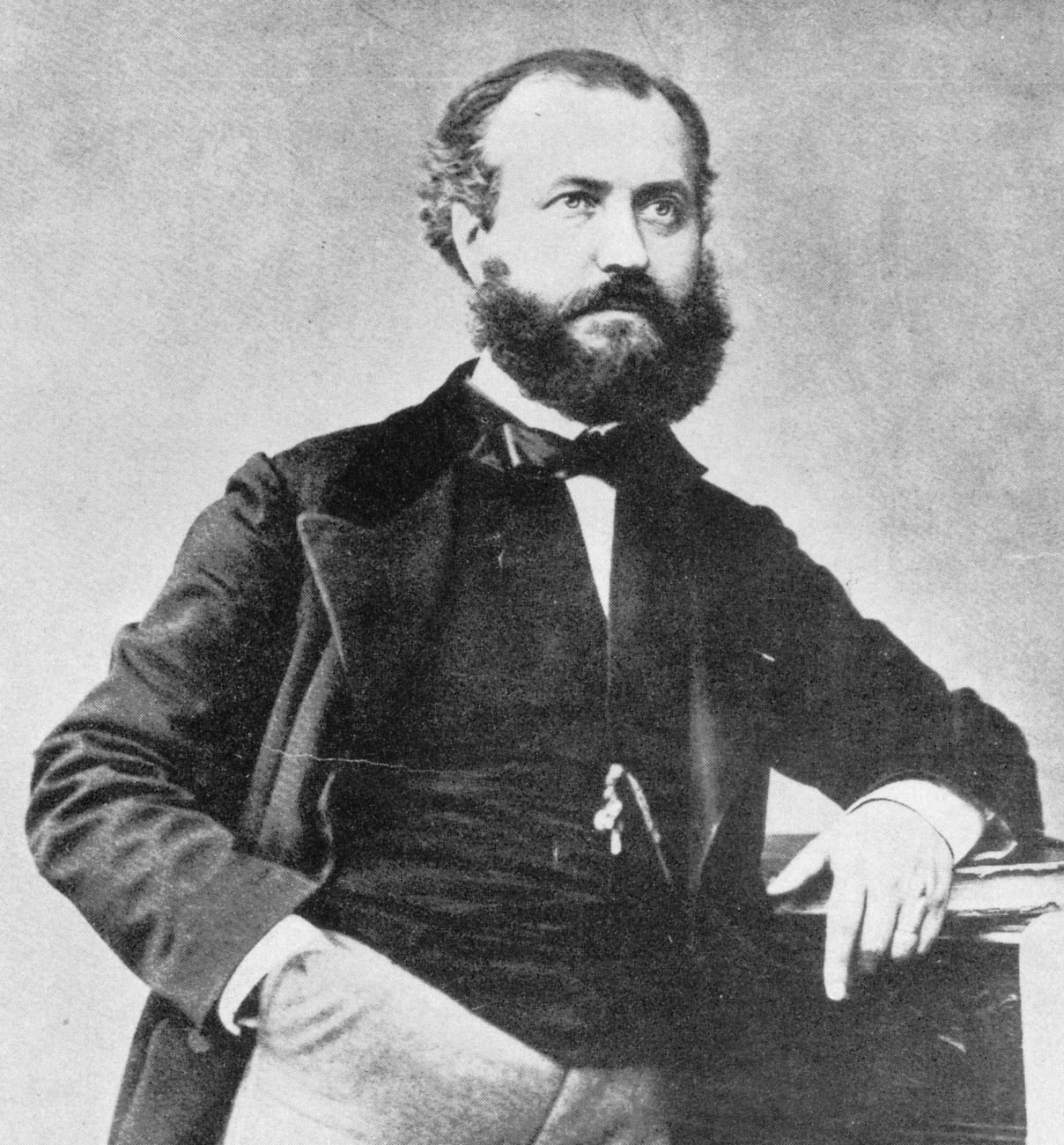
- Gounod in 1859
- English: A heart that loves you
- Text: by Jean Racine
- Language: French
- Composed: 1851
- Published: 1861

D'un cœur qui t'aime (A heart that loves you) is a motet by Charles Gounod. He set a religious text by Jean Racine in both a version for soprano, alto and piano, and another for two four-part choirs a capella.
