= Messe brève no. 7 (Gounod) =

Missa brevis by Charles Gounod

- in C aux chapelles
- Missa brevis by Charles Gounod
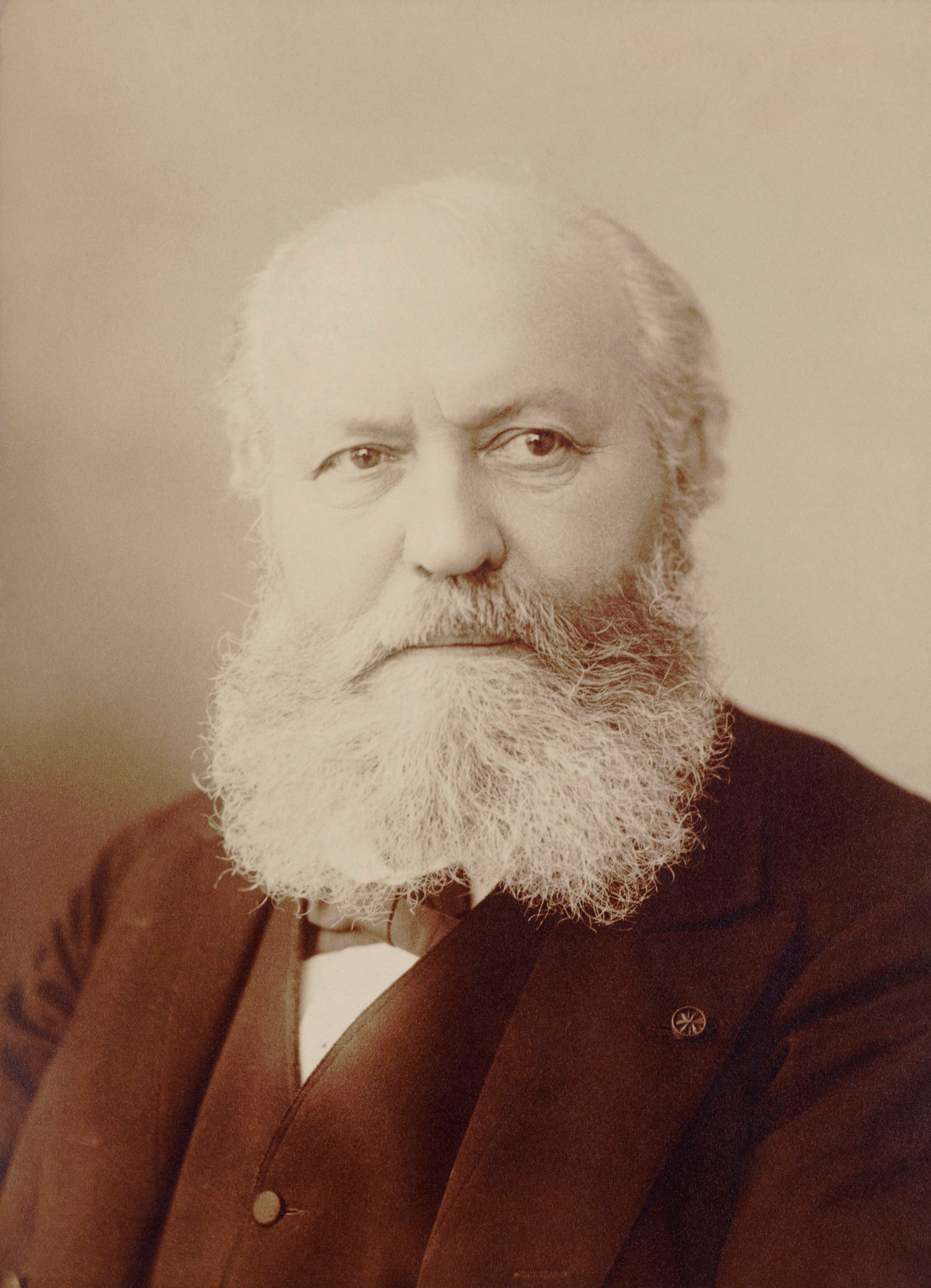
- The composer in 1890
- Text: Order of Mass
- Language: Latin
- Composed: 1877 / 1890
- Movements: 5
- Vocal: SATTBB choir; tenor and bass
- Instrumental: organ

Messe brève no. 7 is a missa brevis in C major by Charles Gounod, composed in 1877 for two vocal parts and organ, and expanded in 1890 to four choir parts and organ. It is subtitled "in C aux chapelles".

== History ==
Charles Gounod, known for operas, was a prolific composer of sacred music. In 1877, he composed the missa brevis in C major, without a Credo and Benedictus but with an added "O salutaris hostia". This first version was scored for two voices (solo and choir) and organ. He wrote a version for two soloists, tenor and bass, four-part choir and organ in 1890. At that time, "aux chapelles" (for chapels) was added to the title. It was first published in 1893. It was published again by Carus-Verlag in 1987, edited by Günter Graulich. In that edition, the music of "O salutaris hostia" is printed with the missing liturgical text Benedictus, adapted by Thomas Kohlhase.

The mass has been included in a recommendation for small choirs.

== Composition ==
Of the Order of Mass, Gounod omitted the Credo and Benedictus, but added a setting of "O salutaris hostia". The vocal parts of the mass are performed by two soloists (tenor and bass) and a choir of four parts in the final version. The soloists sing short versions within the structure, often both as a duet.

In the following table of the movements, the markings, keys and time signatures are taken from the choral score. All movements are in common-time.

No.	Part	Marking	Key
I	Kyrie	Moderato, (sans lenteur)	C major
II	Gloria	Allegro, Andante, Allegro	C major
III	Sanctus	Andante	C major
IV	O salutaris hostia	Adagio	F major
V	Agnus Dei	Moderato	C major

The style is characterised by tone repetitions similar to liturgical chanting. The composer follows the declamation of the words also in motifs. The mass is intentionally simple, with some surprising harmonic developments.

== Recording ==
The mass was recorded as part of a collection of Musica Sacra, sacred music by Gounod, published in 2005 by Carus. It was performed by the chamber choir I Vocalisti, conducted by Hans-Joachim Lustig, with Tobias Götting as the organist.

== Sources ==
- Messe breve No.7 (Gounod, Charles): Scores at the International Music Score Library Project
- Free scores of Messe brève no. 7 (Gounod) in the Choral Public Domain Library (ChoralWiki)
