= James Harding (music writer) =

British writer on music and theatre

James Harding (30 May 1929 – 21 June 2007) was a British writer on music and theatre with a particular interest in 19th- and early 20th-century French subjects and popular British music.

== Biography ==
James Harding was born in Bath, England, but the family moved to Trowbridge. He went on to study French at Bristol University, also spending time at the Sorbonne in Paris, France. He undertook national service in the RAF, but through an accidental hand grenade detonation lost hearing in his left ear. After the war, he worked as a copywriter with Clarks in Somerset, then moved to advertising agencies in London. He wrote a column for the News of the World with the pseudonym "Jane Dunbar". He married and had a son and a daughter.

In 1969 Harding changed his career and became a Lecturer in French at Woolwich Polytechnic, where he taught for 25 years. He obtained a doctorate from Birkbeck College in 1973 with his thesis on the French diarist Paul Léautaud, and published in 1975 wrote a book, Lost Illusions: Paul Léautaud and his World. Initially as a holiday activity he began writing, with his first book in 1965 on Saint-Saëns and His Circle following this in 1968 with Sacha Guitry, The Last Boulevardier and studies of Massenet, Rossini, Gounod, Satie, Offenbach, Maurice Chevalier and Jacques Tati, and provided notes for French music records. British subjects treated by him included Ivor Novello and George Robey.

Late in life Harding became interested in Malaysia, which he visited several times; he taught himself Malay in order to compile a book on the singer and film actor P. Ramlee. He was also a radio broadcaster. Journals for which he wrote included The Listener, Music and Musicians, Records and Recordings and Connaissances des Hommes; and he also had articles in the American Encyclopedia of Music and Musicians and the Dictionnaire de la Musique.

== Selected publications ==
- James Harding, Saint-Saëns and His Circle (1965)
- James Harding, Sacha Guitry: The Last Boulevardier (1967)
- James Harding, The Astonishing Adventure of General Boulanger (1971)
- James Harding, The Ox on the Roof; Scenes From the Musical Life in Paris in the Twenties (1972)
- James Harding, Gounod (1973)
- James Harding, Erik Satie (1975)
- James Harding, Folies de Paris: The Rise and Fall of French Operetta (1979)
- James Harding, Jacques Offenbach: A Biography (1980)
- James Harding, Ivor Novello (1987)
- James Harding, Gerald du Maurier: The Last Actor-Manager (1989)
- James Harding, George Robey and the Music Hall (Hodder & Stoughton Ltd, 1990) ISBN 978-0340499559
