= Saint Francois d'Assise (Gounod) =

Oratorio by Charles Gounod

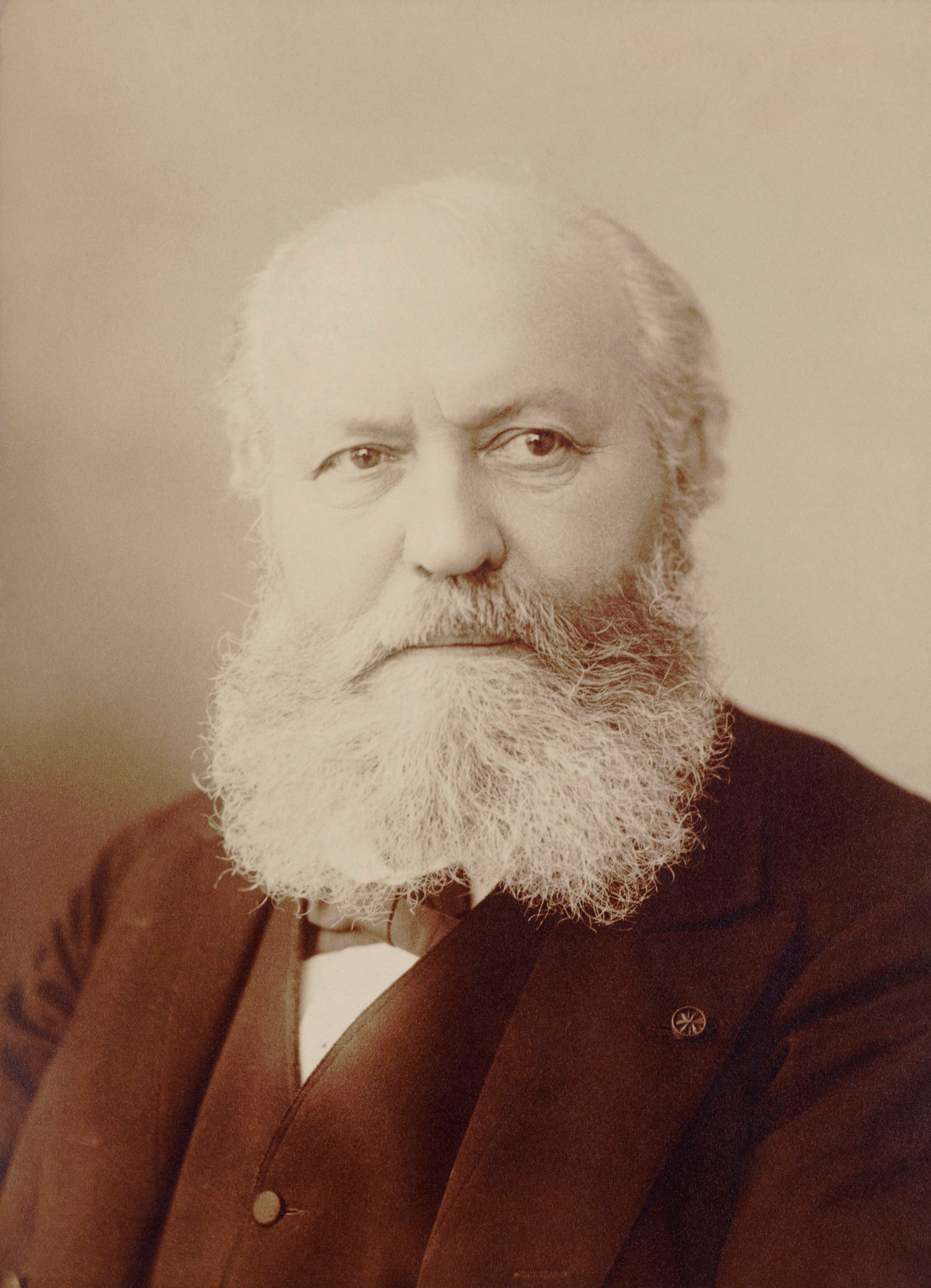
Gounod in 1890, a year before the oratorio's première.

Saint Francois d'Assise is an oratorio from 1891 by Charles Gounod. The oratorio was considered lost until a manuscript was discovered in a convent in Auvers-sur-Oise.

== Recordings ==
- Accentus, Laurence Equilbey. Naïve, sponsored by Palazzetto Bru Zane 2016
