= La colombe =

1860 opera by Charles Gounod

La Colombe
- Opéra comique by Charles Gounod
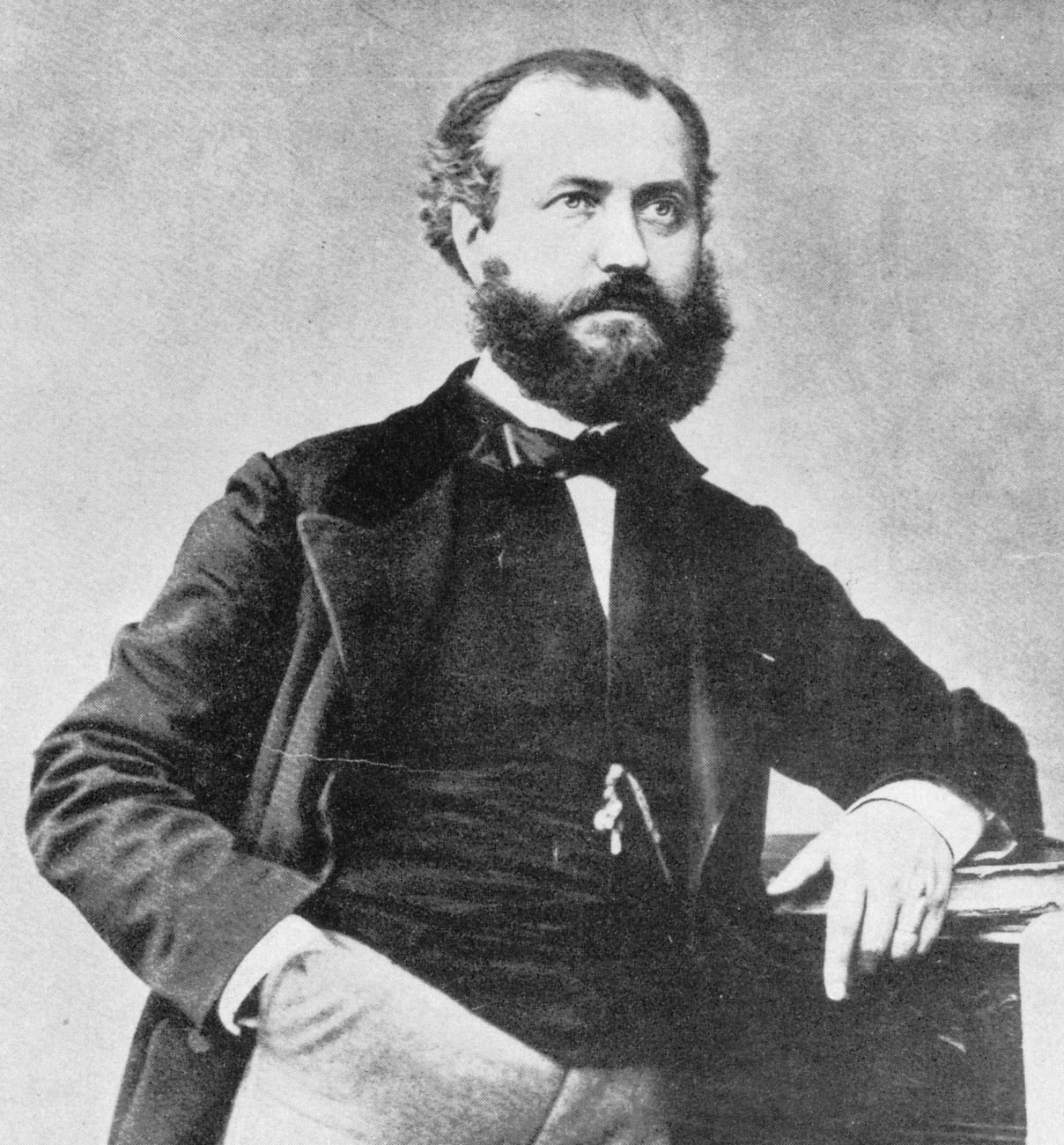
- The composer in 1859, at the premiere of Faust
- Translation: The Dove
- Librettist: Jules Barbier; Michel Carré
- Language: French
- Based on: Le Faucon by Jean de la Fontaine
- Premiere: 3 August 1860 (one-act version); Baden-Baden

La Colombe (The Dove) is an opéra comique in two acts by Charles Gounod with a libretto by Jules Barbier and Michel Carré based on the poem Le Faucon by Jean de La Fontaine, itself after a tale (V,9) in The Decameron of Giovanni Boccaccio.

It premiered in a one-act version at the Theater der Stadt in Baden-Baden on 3 August 1860, where it was well received and performed four times. It was presented in a revised two-act version, with additional music, on 7 June 1866 by the Opéra-Comique at the Salle Favart in Paris.

== Performance history ==
Gounod's previous opera, Philémon et Baucis, also with a text by Barbier and Carré based on a story by La Fontaine, had originally been commissioned for the summer season of 1859 by Édouard Bénazet, the director of the theatre and casino at Baden-Baden. When the political situation between France and Germany deteriorated in June, Gounod's opera was preemptively withdrawn to avoid potential negative reaction from German audiences, and it ended up being premiered in an expanded form in February 1860 by Léon Carvalho at the Théâtre Lyrique in Paris.

To compensate Bénazet for his loss, Gounod quickly composed La colombe during a two-week period for the following summer. (The score is dedicated to Bénazet.) Although the original one-act version received an ovation in Baden-Baden, it did not do particularly well in its expanded two-act revision in 1866 at the Opéra-Comique, receiving a total of only 29 performances.

It was presented in Brussels on 5 December 1867, in Stockholm in Swedish on 11 February 1868, at the Crystal Palace in London on 20 September 1870 (as The Pet Dove in an English translation by Henry Brougham Farnie), in Copenhagen in Danish on 27 April 1873 and Prague in Czech on 22 September 1873. It was presented in Bologna in Italian and again in Paris in French in 1912. Sergei Diaghilev presented it on 1 January 1923 at the Opéra de Monte-Carlo, with recitatives composed by the 24-year-old Francis Poulenc replacing the spoken dialogue.

In the 21st century, La colombe was performed in 2013 in Siena and in Buxton, and also in Paris in 2014.

The opera includes a breeches role for the valet Mazet, and Maitre Jean has a bass aria (Le grand art de cuisine) on the past glories of the kitchen that still turns up in recital occasionally.

== Roles ==
Role	Voice type	Premiere cast, 3 August 1860 (Conductor: –)	Revised version, 7 June 1866 (Conductor: Théophile Tilmant)
Sylvie, a wealthy countess	soprano	Marie Caroline Miolan-Carvalho	Marie Cico
Horace, poor, but in love with Sylvie	tenor	Gustave-Hippolyte Roger	Victor Capoul
Mazet, manservant to Horace	soprano	Amélie Faivre	Caroline Girard
Maître Jean, majordomo of the countess	bass	Mathieu-Émile Balanqué	Charles-Amable Bataille

== Synopsis ==
The opera takes place in Florence.

=== Act 1 ===
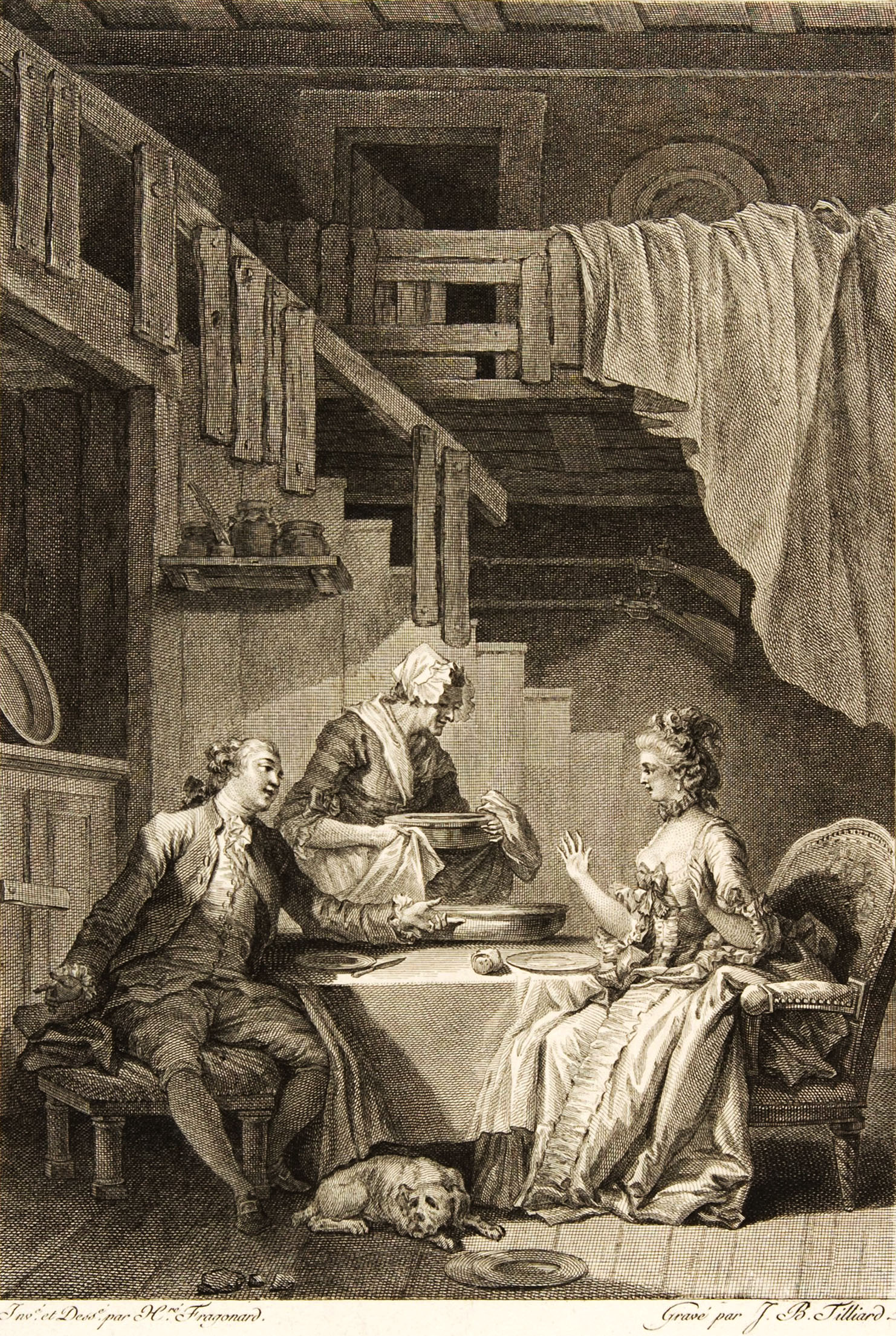
Le Faucon. Etching by Jean-Baptiste Tilliard, after Jean-Honoré Fragonard. The conte by La Fontaine was the primary source for the libretto of La Colombe

Mazet, the servant of Horace, a young Florentine noble who has lost his fortune, sings couplets in praise of his master's dove (romance: Apaisez blanche colombe, "Soothe the white dove"). Maître Jean, the majordomo of Countess Sylvie, arrives to buy the bird for her, as she is jealous of her rival Aminte, who seduces her lovers with a trained parrot. Mazet explains that the dove cannot be used as a messenger, but that he will try to convince his master to sell it. Despite the poverty in which he lives – and to Maître Jean's surprise – Horace does not want to give up his favourite bird (romance and trio: Qu'il garde son argent, "Let him keep his money"). Maître Jean learns, however, that Horace is in love with Sylvie. He suggests to Sylvie that she try to buy the dove herself; she hesitates but finally agrees. Sylvie is confident that the power of love will lead Horace to let her have the bird (aria: Je veux interroger ce jeune homme, "I want to question this young man"). Sylvie's arrival causes Horace the greatest happiness. She announces that she will stay for dinner (quartet: O douce joie, "Oh, sweet joy").

=== Act 2 ===
Maître Jean has volunteered to prepare the meal and sings about the culinary arts (aria: Le grand art de cuisine, "The great art of cooking"). Mazet returns from the market empty-handed, because the suppliers refuse to give Horace credit. After a long discussion with Maître Jean about the best way to serve different dishes, all of which are obviously impossible to prepare in such circumstances, Horace and Mazet set the table and decide to kill the dove for the meal (duet: Il faut d'abord dresser la table, "First, the table must be set"). Meanwhile, Sylvie is filled with tender thoughts of Horace (romance: Que de rêves charmants, "What charming dreams"). They sit down to dinner and, as Sylvie is about to ask for the dove, Horace reveals that it has been killed for her dinner. Mazet appears with a roasted bird, but it is not the dove, but Aminte's parrot that had escaped earlier. Sylvie is delighted to learn that Horace's dove is still alive, as it will always be there to remind her of his love.

== Differences from the text sources ==
In both the Boccaccio tale (day V, story 9) from the Decameron, and the conte Le Faucon of La Fontaine, the bird, a falcon, is killed and served. The lady is moved by the sacrifice made by the bird's owner and responds with love.

== Recordings ==
Year	Cast (Sylvie, Horace, Mazet, Maître Jean)	Conductor, Orchestra	Label
2015	Erin Morley, Javier Camarena, Michèle Losier, Laurent Naouri	Mark Elder, The Hallé	CD: Opera Rara; Cat: ORC53
