= Gebhard =

Gebhard (Gebhart) is a German given name, recorded at least from the 9th century. It is composed of the Old High German elements geb "gift" and hard "brave, hardy".

== People with the surname ==
- Bob Gebhard, American baseball player and general manager
- Chris Gebhard, American politician
- David Gebhard, American architectural historian
- Derek Gebhard, American soccer player
- Elisa Gebhard, Finnish politician
- Enrique Gebhard, Chilean architect
- Fran Gebhard, Canadian theatre director and actor
- Frederick Gebhard (1860–1910), American racehorse owner
- Hannes Gebhard, Finnish economist, cooperative movement activist and politician
- Hans Gebhard-Elsaß, German composer and music educator
- Hedvig Gebhard, Finnish journalist and politician
- Heike Gebhard (born 1954), German politician
- Heinrich Gebhard (1878–1963), German-American pianist, composer and teacher
- Isabelle Gebhard Neilson, American socialite
- Jaycee Gebhard, Canadian ice hockey player
- John Gebhard, American lawyer and politician
- Louis Gebhard, American football player and coach
- Maiju Gebhard, Finnish inventor
- Paul Gebhard (1917-2015), American anthropologist and sexologist
- Philipp Müller-Gebhard, German general
- Renate Gebhard (born 1977), Italian jurist and politician
- Rollo Gebhard (1921–2013), German sailor and writer
- Wilhelm Gebhard (born 1976), German politician

== Given and/or ceremonial names ==
- Gebhard, Count of the Lahngau
- Gebhard, Duke of Lorraine (888–910), Frankish noble
- Gebhard of Constance (949–995), Austrian bishop and saint
- Gebhard I (bishop of Regensburg) (died 1023)
- Gebhard I von Mansfeld-Vorderort, Archbishop-Elector of Cologne
- Gebhard I of Plain
- Gebhard II (bishop of Regensburg) (died 1036)
- Gebhard III (bishop of Constance)
- Gebhard III (bishop of Regensburg) (died 1060)
- Gebhard III of Sulzbach
- Gebhard XXV. von Alvensleben, Magdeburg Privy Councilor, aristocrat and historian
- Gebhard of Lippe
- Gebhard of Salzburg (about 1010–1088), Archbishop there, from 1060
- Gebhard of Supplinburg
- Gebhard Flatz, Austrian painter
- Gebhard Fugel, German painter
- Gebhard Fürst, German Roman Catholic bishop
- Gebhard Gerner, politician from Liechtenstein
- Gebhard Gritsch, Austrian sports coach and consultant
- Gebhard Halder, Austrian farmer and politician
- Gebhard Hoch, politician from Liechtenstein
- Gebhard Leberecht von Blücher, Prussian field marshal
- Gebhard Ludwig Himmler, German Nazi functionary, mechanical engineer and older brother of Reichsführer-SS Heinrich Himmler
- Gebhard Moltke, Danish nobleman and civil servant
- Gebhard Müller, German lawyer and politician
- Gebhard Oberbichler, Austrian luger
- Gebhard Poltera, Swiss ice hockey player
- Gebhard Rohner, Swiss politician
- Gebhard Schädler, surgeon from Liechtenstein
- Gebhard Truchsess von Waldburg, archbishop-elector of Cologne
- Gebhard Ullmann, German jazz musician and composer
- Gebhard von Dollnstein-Hirschberg, birth name of Pope Victor II
- Alexander Heinrich Gebhard von Zastrow, Prussian officer
- Augustus Maria Bernard Anthony John Gebhard Toebbe, German-born American prelate of the Catholic Church
- Johann Gebhard Maass, German psychologist
- Sebastian Gebhard Messmer, Swiss-born American Catholic prelate

== See also ==
- Gebhard, the former name of Agate, Colorado, United States
- Gebhard v Consiglio dell'Ordine degli Avvocati e Procuratori di Milano, EU law case
- Gebhard Woods State Park, Illinois, United States
- Gephardt
