= Hannula =

Hannula is a Finnish-language surname. Notable people with the name include:

- Dick Hannula, American swimming coach
- Edvard Hannula (1859–1931), Finnish Lutheran clergyman and politician
- Heidi Hannula (born 1980), Finnish sprinter
- Janne Hannula (born 1982), Finnish football player
- Jim Hannula (born 1959), American football player
- Joose Olavi Hannula (1900–1944), Finnish colonel and historian
- Mandi Hannula (1880–1952), Finnish schoolteacher and politician
- Mika Hannula, (born 1979), Swedish ice hockey player
- Mikko Hannula, Finnish sports commentator and journalist
- Rodney R. Hannula, retired Major General in the National Guard of the United States
- Toni Hannula (born 1962), Finnish wrestler
- Uuno Hannula (1891–1963), Finnish journalist and politician
