= Faust (opera) =

Grand opera in five acts by Charles Gounod

- Opera by Charles Gounod
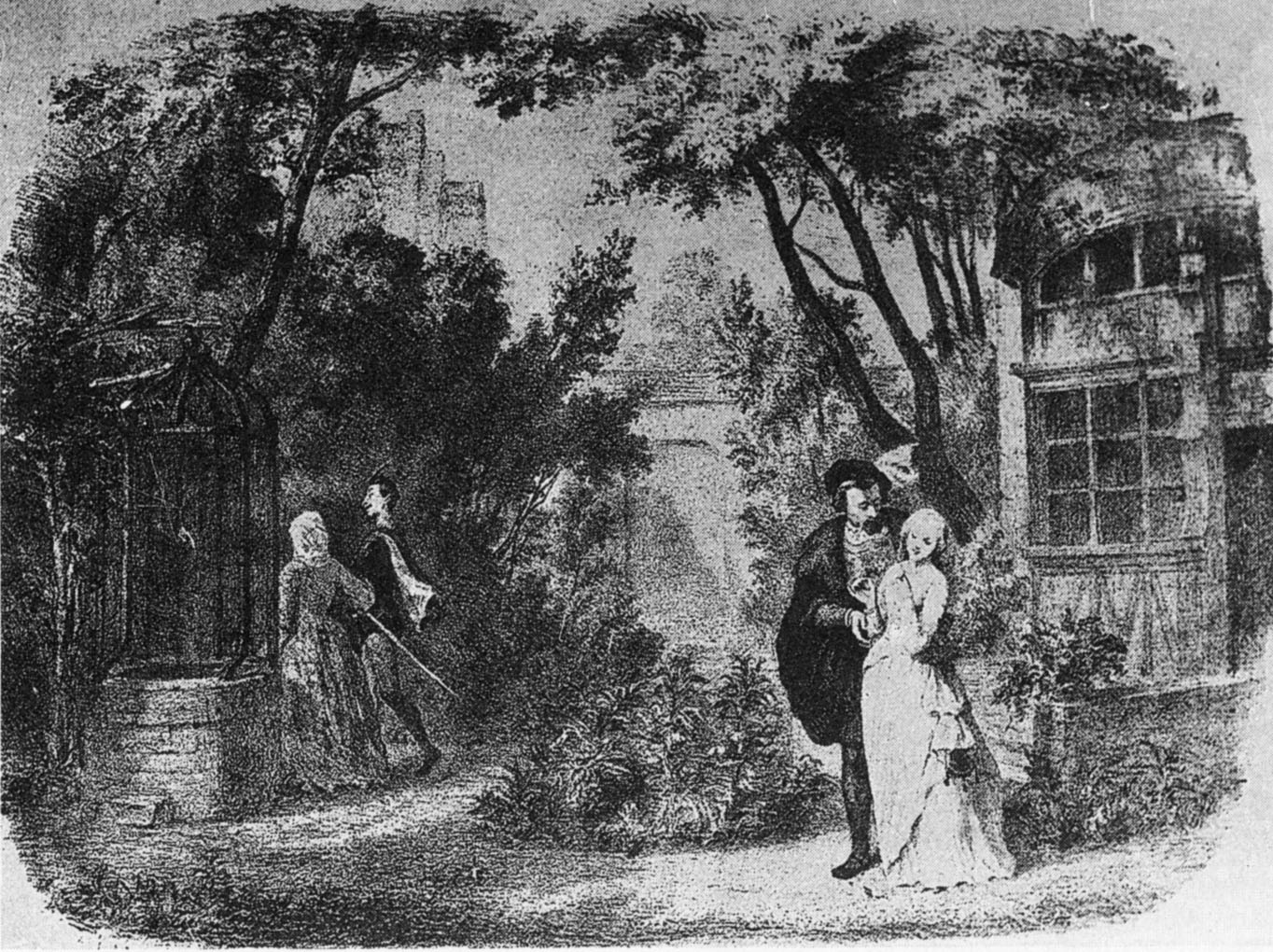
- Marguerite's garden in the original production, set design by Édouard Desplechin
- Other title: Margarethe or Gretchen
- Librettist: Jules Barbier; Michel Carré
- Language: French
- Based on: Faust et Marguerite by Michel Carré
- Premiere: 19 March 1859; Théâtre Lyrique, Paris
- Website: Profile at Opera-Online.com

Faust is a grand opera in five acts by Charles Gounod to a French libretto by Jules Barbier and Michel Carré from Carré's play Faust et Marguerite, in turn loosely based on Johann Wolfgang von Goethe's Faust, Part One. It debuted at the Théâtre Lyrique on the Boulevard du Temple in Paris on 19 March 1859, with influential sets designed by Charles-Antoine Cambon and Joseph Thierry, Jean Émile Daran, Édouard Desplechin, and Philippe Chaperon.

== Performance history ==
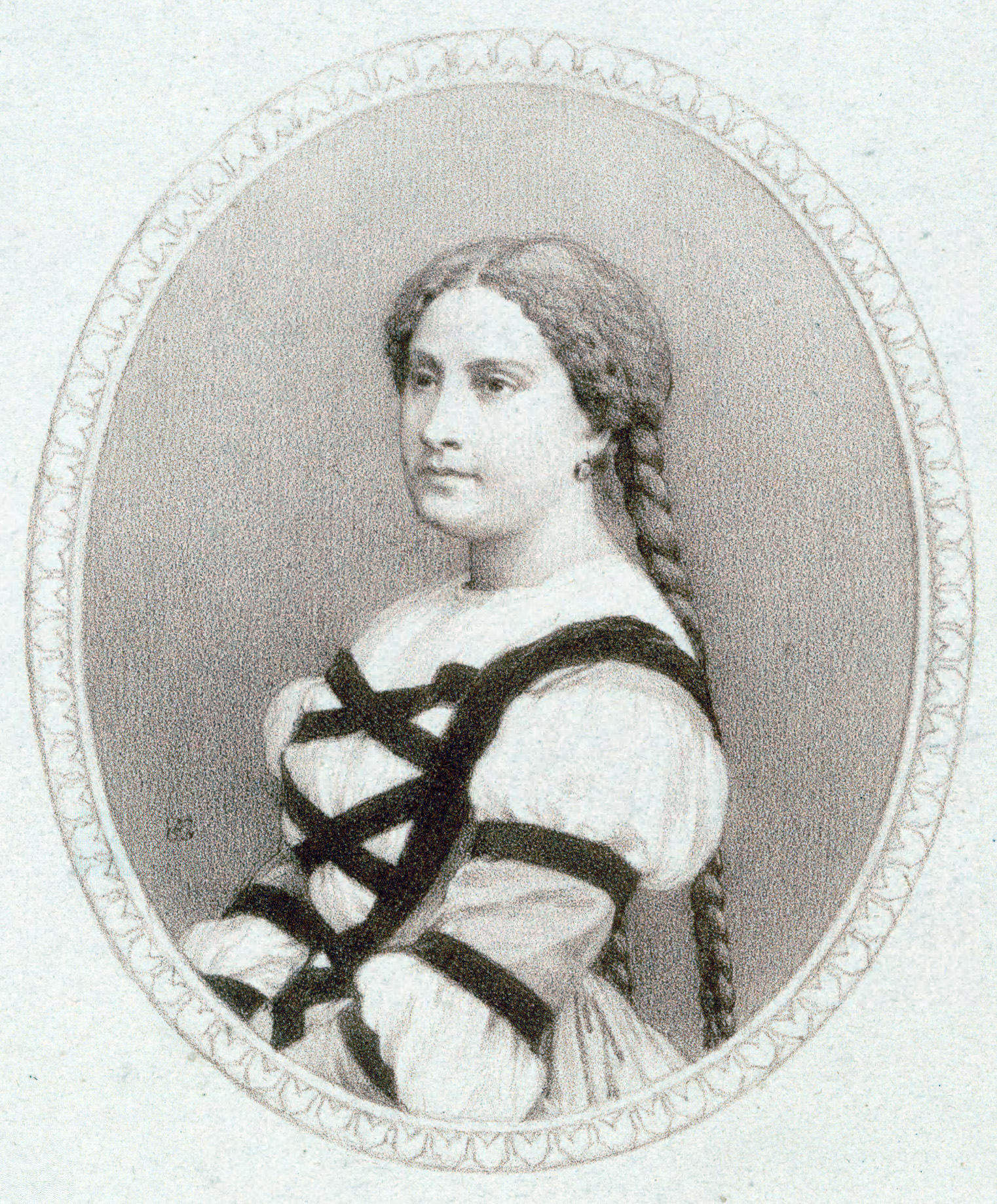
Miolan-Carvalho as Marguerite (1860)

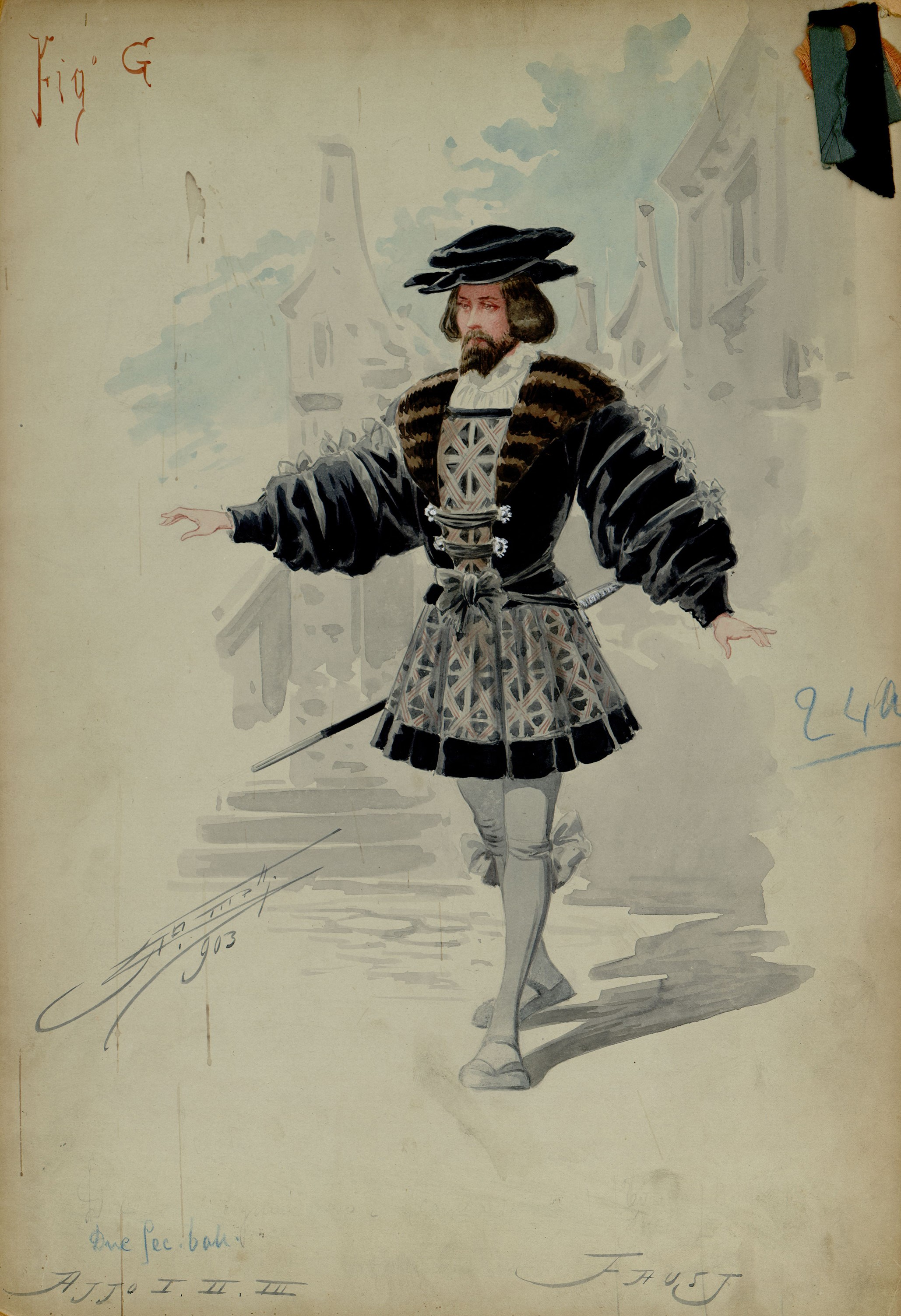
Costume design for Faust

The original version of Faust employed spoken dialogue, and it was in this form that the work was first performed. The manager of the Théâtre Lyrique, Léon Carvalho cast his wife Caroline Miolan-Carvalho as Marguerite and there were various changes during production, including the removal and contraction of several numbers. The tenor Hector Gruyer was originally cast as Faust but was found to be inadequate during rehearsals, being eventually replaced by a principal of the Opéra-Comique, Joseph-Théodore-Désiré Barbot, shortly before the opening night.

After a successful initial run at the Théâtre Lyrique the publisher Antoine Choudens, who purchased the copyright for 10,000 francs, took the work (now with recitatives replacing the spoken dialogue) on tour through Germany, Belgium, Italy and England, with Caroline Miolan-Carvalho repeating her role.

Performances in Germany followed, with the Dresden Semperoper in 1861 being the first to bill the work as Margarethe rather than Faust. For many years this custom – or alternatively, staging the opera as Gretchen – continued in Germany. Some sources claim this was out of respect for part 1 of Goethe's poetic drama, which the opera follows closely. Others claim the opposite: that the retitling was done to emphasise Gounod's opera's reliance on Goethe's characters, and to differentiate it from Louis Spohr's Faust, which had held the stage for many years in Germany and had recently appeared (1851) in a three-act revision. It is also possible that the 1861 Dresden title change was out of respect for Spohr's close and long association with the city.

The opera was given for the first time in Italy at La Scala in 1862 and in England at Her Majesty's Theatre, London (in Italian) in 1863. In 1864, when the opera was given at the same venue in English, Gounod took a theme from the prelude to the opera and wrote a new aria for the star baritone Charles Santley in the role of Valentin, 'Even bravest heart may swell' (with words by Henry Chorley). This number was then translated into French for subsequent productions as "Avant de quitter ces lieux" and has become one of the most familiar pieces from the opera.

In 1869 a ballet had to be inserted (into the first scene of the final act) before the work could be played at the Opéra: it became the most frequently performed opera at that house. With the change from spoken dialogue to sung recitatives, plus the musical and balletic additions, the opera was thus finally transformed into a work following the conventions of grand opera.

It was Faust - performed in Italian - with which the Metropolitan Opera in New York City opened for the first time on 22 October 1883; the opera remained so popular there during its first few decades that the Met was nicknamed the "Faustspielhaus", a pun on Festspielhaus. It is Met's eighth most frequently performed opera, with 753 performances through the 2012–2013 season. It was not until the period between 1965 and 1977 that the full version was performed (and then with some minor cuts), and all performances in that production included the Walpurgisnacht ballet.

Composer Jerry Goldsmith uses three pieces from Faust in his soundtrack to Franklin J. Shaffner's 1973 film Papillon. Three pieces are heard diegetically by the characters as they struggle to escape during a prison concert.

Martin Scorsese's 1993 film The Age of Innocence shows a scene from the opera at the beginning (duet Marguerite/Faust: “Il se fait tard! ... adieu!”, third act).

A recording was made in 2018 of the 1859 version, by Les Talens Lyriques conducted by Christophe Rousset, which endeavoured to present the opera as first performed at the Théâtre Lyrique "closer in kinship to the traditional opéra comique in its interleaving of musical numbers with spoken passages". The recording, produced by Bru Zane, featured Véronique Gens, Benjamin Bernheim and Andrew Foster-Williams in principal roles.

== Roles ==
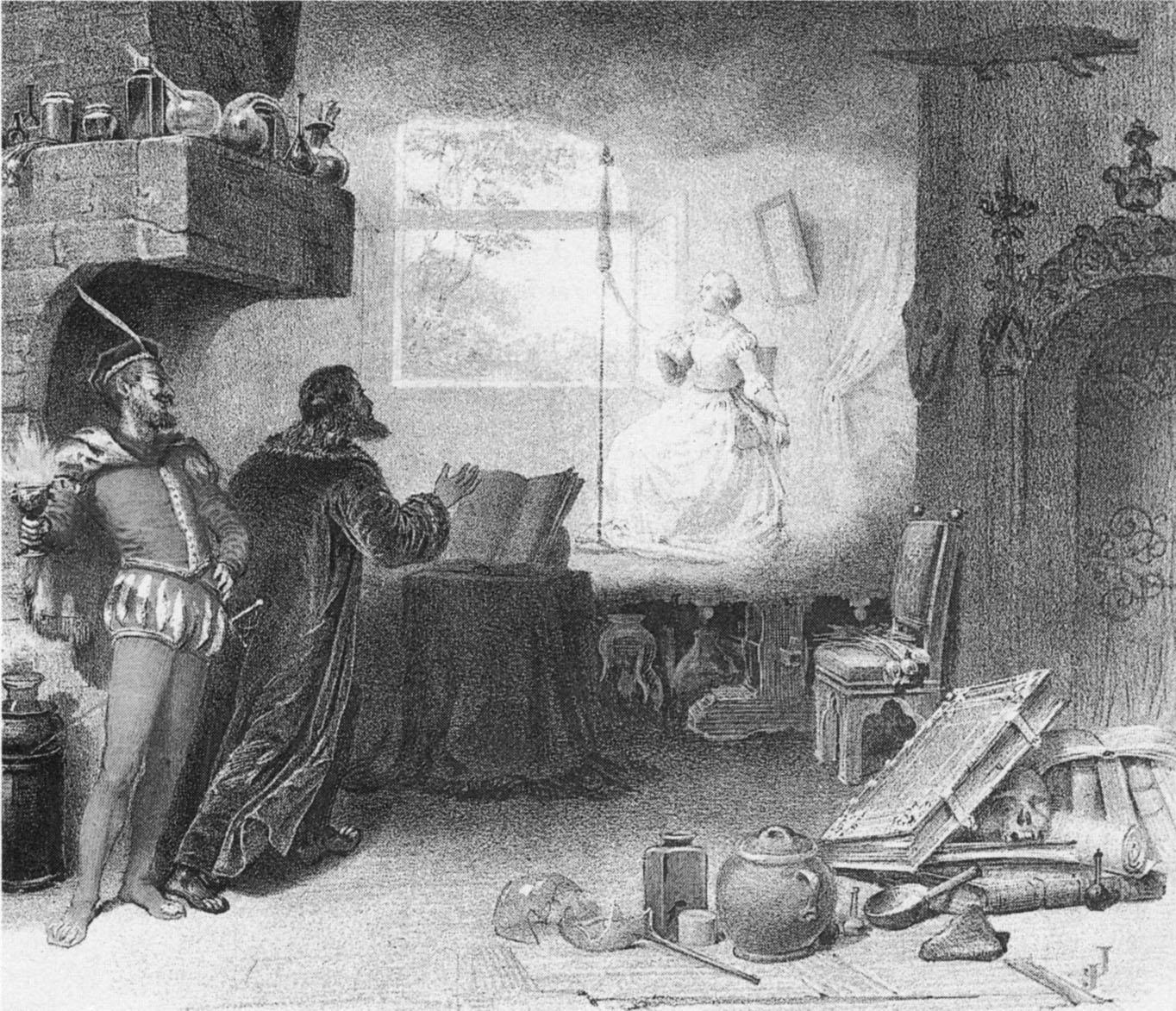
The vision of Marguerite as staged at Covent Garden in 1864 with Jean-Baptiste Faure as Méphistophélès and Giovanni Mario as Faust

Roles, voice types, premiere cast
| Role | Voice type | Premiere cast, 19 March 1859 Conductor: Adolphe Deloffre |
|---|---|---|
| Faust, a philosopher and metaphysician | tenor | Joseph-Théodore-Désiré Barbot |
| Méphistophélès, a familiar spirit of Hell | bass-baritone | Mathieu-Émile Balanqué |
| Marguerite, a young maiden | soprano | Caroline Miolan-Carvalho |
| Valentin, a soldier and Marguerite's brother | baritone | Osmond Raynal |
| Wagner, friend of Valentin | baritone | M. Cibot |
| Siebel, a youth in love with Marguerite | mezzo-soprano (breeches role/travesti) | Amélie Faivre |
| Marthe Schwerlein, Marguerite's guardian | mezzo-soprano or contralto | Duclos |
Young girls, labourers, students, soldiers, burghers, matrons, invisible demons, church choir, witches, queens and courtesans of antiquity, celestial voices

== Synopsis ==
Place: Germany
Time: 16th century

=== Act 1 ===
Faust's cabinet

"O merveille! ... A moi les plaisirs"
Méphistophélès (Marcel Journet) gives Faust (Enrico Caruso) a glimpse of Marguerite, and he signs the contract with the Devil, and heads out with him to experience the world, in this 1910 recording of the act 1 finale.

"Le veau d'or"
Méphistophélès, act 2, performed by Feodor Chaliapin

Faust, an aging scholar, determines that his studies have come to nothing and have only caused him to miss out on life and love ("Rien! En vain j'interroge"). He attempts to kill himself (twice) with poison but stops each time when he hears a choir. He curses hope and faith, and asks for infernal guidance. Méphistophélès appears (duet: "Me voici") and, with a tempting image of Marguerite at her spinning wheel, persuades Faust to buy Méphistophélès's services on Earth in exchange for Faust's in Hell. Faust's goblet of poison is magically transformed into an elixir of youth, making the aged doctor a handsome young gentleman; the strange companions then set out into the world.

=== Act 2 ===
At the city gates

A chorus of students, soldiers and villagers sings a drinking song ("Vin ou Bière"). Valentin, leaving for war with his friend Wagner, entrusts the care of his sister Marguerite to his youthful friend Siebel ("O sainte médaille ... Avant de quitter ces lieux"). Méphistophélès appears, provides the crowd with wine, and sings a rousing, irreverent song about the golden calf ("Le veau d'or"). Méphistophélès predicts Wagner will not return from the war and maligns Marguerite, and Valentin tries to strike him with his sword, which shatters in the air. Valentin and friends use the cross-shaped hilts of their swords to fend off what they now know is an infernal power (chorus: "De l'enfer"). Méphistophélès is joined by Faust and the villagers in a waltz ("Ainsi que la brise légère"). Marguerite appears and Faust declares his admiration, but she refuses Faust's arm out of modesty, a quality that makes him love her even more.

=== Act 3 ===
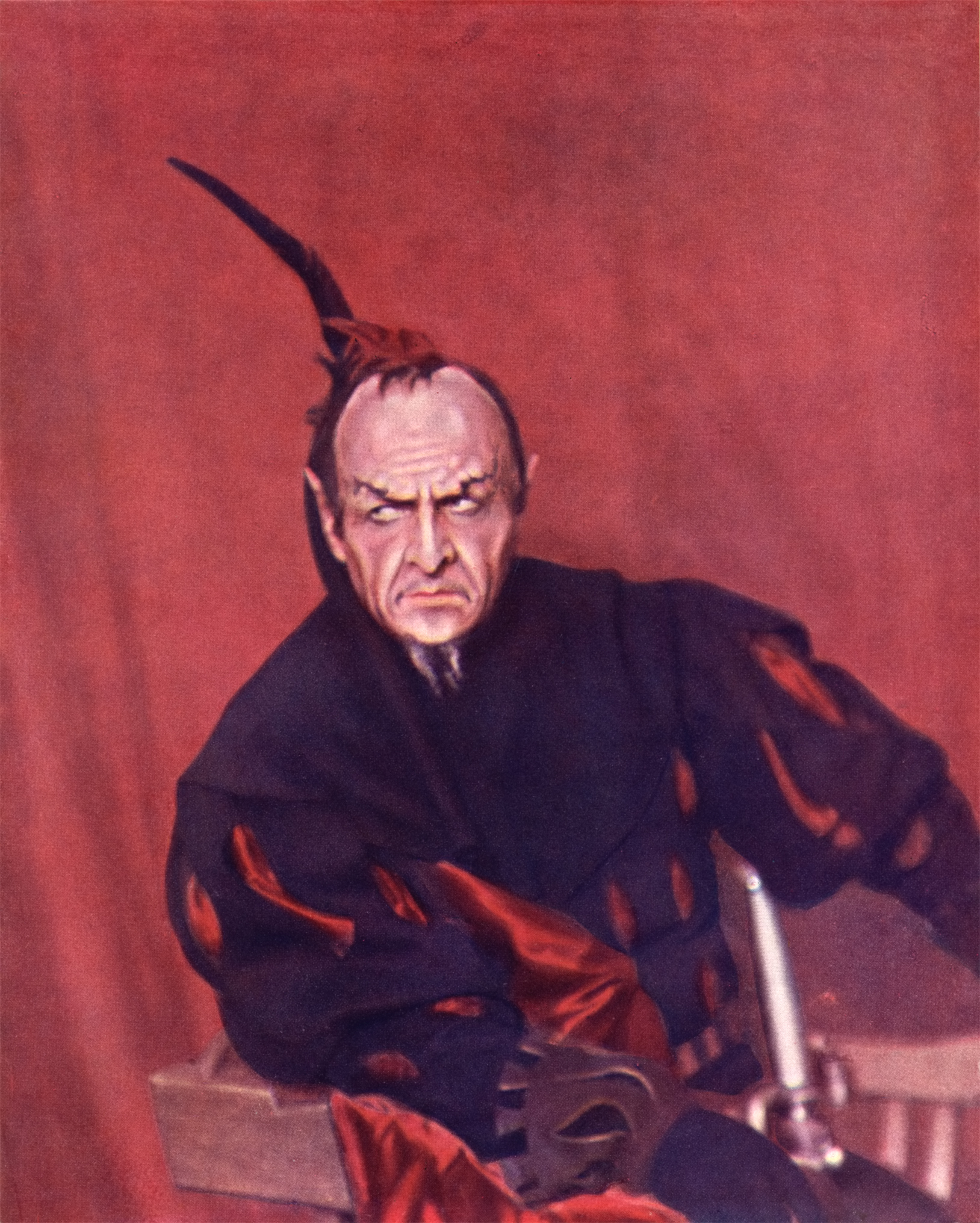
Feodor Chaliapin as Méphistophélès, 1915

Marguerite's garden

The lovesick boy Siebel leaves a bouquet for Marguerite ("Faites-lui mes aveux"). Faust sends Méphistophélès in search of a gift for Marguerite and sings a cavatina ("Salut, demeure chaste et pure") idealizing Marguerite as a pure child of nature. Méphistophélès brings in a decorated box containing exquisite jewelry and a hand mirror and leaves it on Marguerite's doorstep, next to Siebel's flowers. Marguerite enters, pondering her encounter with Faust at the city gates, and sings a melancholy ballad about the King of Thule ("Il était un roi de Thulé"). Marthe, Marguerite's neighbour, notices the jewellery and says it must be from an admirer. Marguerite tries on the jewels and is captivated by how they enhance her beauty, as she sings in the famous aria, the Jewel Song ("Oh dieu! Que de bijoux ... Ah! je ris de me voir si belle en ce miroir"). Méphistophélès and Faust join the women in the garden and romance them. Marguerite allows Faust to kiss her ("Laisse-moi, laisse-moi contempler ton visage"), but then asks him to go away. She sings at her window for his quick return, and Faust, listening, returns to her. Under the watchful eye and malevolent laughter of Méphistophélès, it is clear that Faust's seduction of Marguerite will be successful.

=== Act 4 ===
"Vous qui faites l'endormie"
Méphistophélès, act 4, performed by Feodor Chaliapin

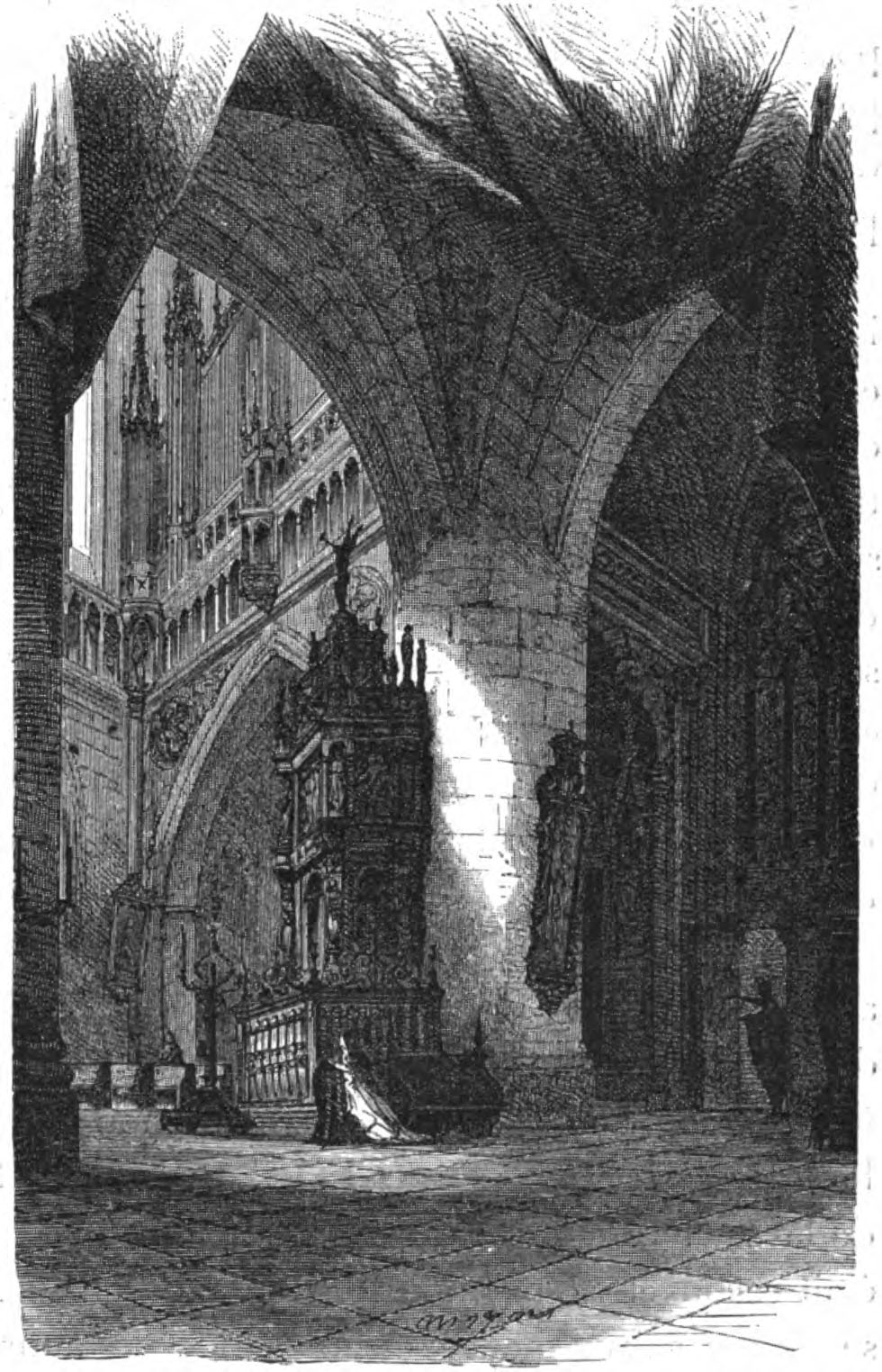
Marguerite prays in the cathedral, set design by Charles-Antoine Cambon

Marguerite's room / A public square outside her house / A cathedral

[Note: The scenes of act 4 are sometimes given in a different order and portions are sometimes shortened or cut in performance.] After being made pregnant and seemingly abandoned by Faust, Marguerite has given birth and is a social outcast. She sings an aria at her spinning wheel ("Il ne revient pas"). Siebel stands by her. The scene shifts to the square outside Marguerite's house. Valentin's company returns from the war to a military march ("Déposons les armes" and "Gloire immortelle de nos aïeux", the well-known "soldiers' chorus"). Siebel asks Valentin to forgive Marguerite. Valentin rushes to her cottage. While he is inside Faust and Méphistophélès appear, and Méphistophélès, knowing that Marguerite is not in there alone, sings a mocking burlesque of a lover's serenade under Marguerite's window ("Vous qui faites l'endormie"). Valentin takes the bait and comes out of the cottage, now knowing that Faust has debauched his sister. The two men fight, but Faust is reluctant to hurt the brother of the woman he adores. Méphistophélès blocks Valentin's sword, allowing Faust to make the fatal thrust. With his dying breath Valentin blames Marguerite for his death and condemns her to hell before the assembled townspeople ("Ecoute-moi bien Marguerite"). Marguerite goes to the church and tries to pray there but is stopped, first by the sadistic Méphistophélès and then by a choir of devils. She finishes her prayer but faints when she is cursed again by Méphistophélès.

=== Act 5 ===
The Harz mountains on Walpurgis Night / A cavern / The interior of a prison

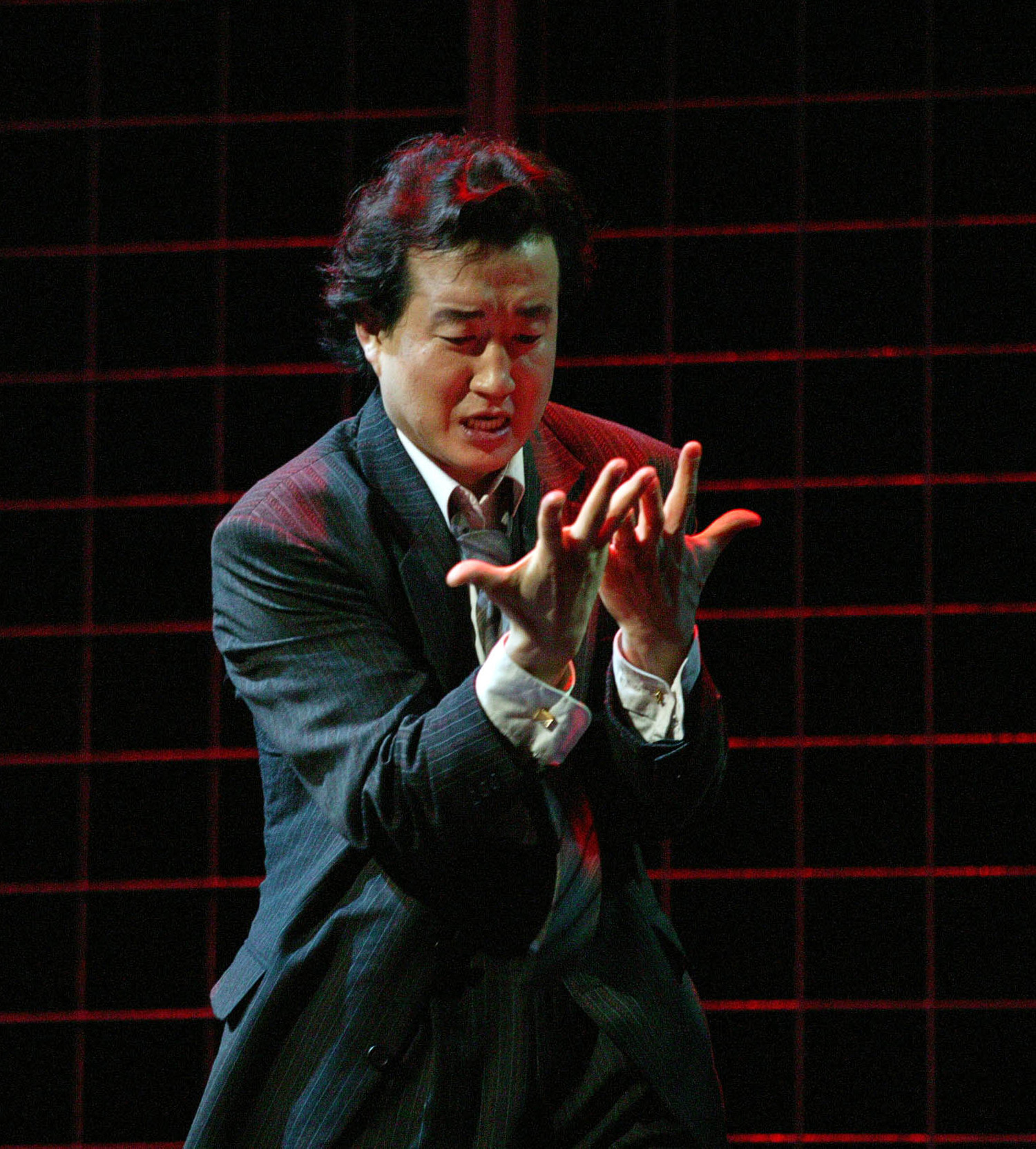
Faust (Jaewoo Kim) realises the consequences of his actions, 2006 New Zealand Opera production

Méphistophélès and Faust are surrounded by witches ("Un, deux et trois"). Faust is transported to a cave of queens and courtesans, and Méphistophélès promises to provide Faust with the love of the greatest and most beautiful women in history. An orgiastic ballet suggests the revelry that continues throughout the night. As dawn approaches, Faust sees a vision of Marguerite and calls for her. Méphistophélès helps Faust enter the prison where Marguerite is being held for killing her child. They sing a love duet ("Oui, c'est toi que j'aime"). Méphistophélès states that only a mortal hand can deliver Marguerite from her fate, and Faust offers to rescue her from the hangman, but she prefers to trust her fate to God and His angels ("Anges purs, anges radieux"). At the end she asks why Faust's hands are covered in blood, pushes him away, and falls down motionless. Méphistophélès curses, as a voice on high sings "Sauvée!" ("Saved!"). The bells of Easter sound and a chorus of angels sings "Christ est ressuscité!" ("Christ is risen!"). The walls of the prison open, and Marguerite's soul rises to heaven. In despair Faust follows it with his eyes; he falls to his knees and prays. Méphistophélès is turned away by the shining sword of the archangel.

== Ballet ==
Although the Walpurgisnacht ballet sequence from act 5 is usually omitted from modern staged performances of Faust, it is frequently performed separately as a concert work or part of a ballet program, e.g. George Balanchine's Walpurgisnacht Ballet.
