= 2008 Rally Finland =

Motor rally competition

2008 Rally Finland 58th Neste Oil Rally Finland
Round 9 of the 2008 World Rally Championship
← Previous event	Next event →
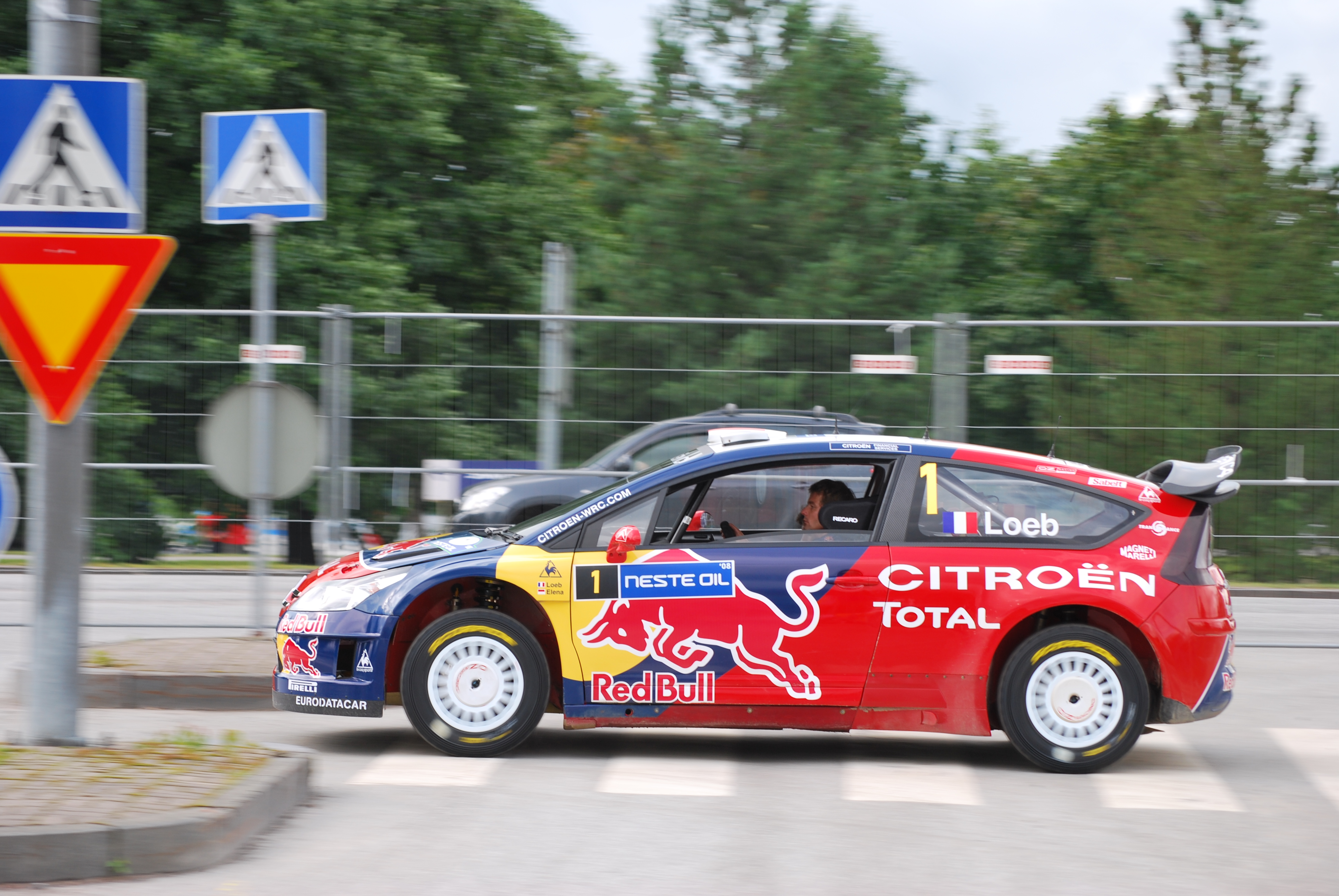
- Sebastien Loeb driving out from service at Jyväskylä.
- Host country: Finland
- Rally base: Jyväskylä, Finland
- Dates run: July 31 – August 3, 2008
- Stages: 24 (340.42 km; 211.53 miles)
- Stage surface: Gravel
- Overall distance: 1,461.58 km (908.18 miles)

Statistics
- Crews: 108 at start, 68 at finish

Overall results
- Overall winner: (France) Sébastien Loeb; Citroën Total World Rally Team

The 58th Rally Finland, the ninth rally of the 2008 World Rally Championship season took place between July 31 and August 3, 2008. The event was the first rally held after a six-week mid season break. The rally was based in the city of Jyväskylä in the centre of Finland with the special stages held on fast gravel roads in the lake district area of the country. The winner was the reigning world champion Sébastien Loeb, who became only the fourth non Scandinavian driver to win the event in fifty-eight runnings. It was his sixth win of the season and reduced the gap in the championship standings between himself and Finland's Mikko Hirvonen to just one point. Hirvonen finished in second, with Chris Atkinson taking the third podium spot for the Subaru World Rally Team. This would prove to be Subaru’s final podium in the world championship.

== Event ==
=== Day one ===
The event started with a short superspecial stage on Thursday evening - which was won by Sébastien Loeb - before the first full day of action on Friday. The first stage on Friday demonstrated the competitive nature of the rally, with Loeb and Hirvonen setting identical times, and Jari-Matti Latvala only finishing three seconds behind them. However, Latvala was the first big casualty, hitting a rock on SS3 and damaging the suspension - an accident that put him out for the day and angered his Ford team boss Malcolm Wilson (rally). Meanwhile, Loeb was eking out a narrow advantage by winning every special stage until SS8. Hirvonen was also driving flat out and matched Loeb's time on SS6 and took his first outright stage win on the 7.86 mile test at Urria. At the end of day one, Loeb had built up a useful lead of 14.4 seconds, although Hirvonen had not given up hope. Behind the two leaders saw a three way battle between the two Stobart Ford drivers, Henning Solberg and Gigi Galli, and Loeb's teammate Dani Sordo. These three were covered by only twelve seconds. The two Subaru World Rally Team drivers, Petter Solberg and Chris Atkinson were having their own private battle, just over ninety seconds behind the leader. Suzuki's Per-Gunnar Andersson was in the final points paying position despite suffering a huge spin on SS2. Impressive performances were made by privateers Urmo Aava and Andreas Mikkelsen, with both featuring in the points earlier on day one - Aava was third after SS4 with Mikkelsen in fifth. However they both crashed out near the end of day one - Aava in SS9 and Mikkelsen in SS10.

=== Day two ===
The battle between Loeb and Hirvonen continued throughout day two with the pair regularly setting fastest times. They were opening up a big lead to the drivers behind them, with Hirvonen describing the pace as "crazy...how much longer can this go on for, I don't know." By the end of the day Loeb had pulled out another four seconds to take his lead to eighteen seconds. Most of this time was gained when Hirvonen stalled at the start of SS20. Behind the leaders, Gigi Galli had been drawing away in the battle for third before an accident in the Kakaristo stage (which was a truncated and reversed version of Ouninpohja) put him out of the rally. After Galli, PG Andersson also rolled at the same corner. The main mover of the day was Subaru driver Chris Atkinson who leapt from seventh to third on the leaderboard by the end of day two. Dani Sordo was only a second behind in fourth but was having to be cautious in order to score manufacturer points. Henning Solberg was slipping back in fifth place while his brother Petter was one place behind in sixth. Privateer driver Matti Rantanen had moved up to seventh due to the retirements of others and Toni Gardemeister was keeping his Suzuki in the points despite having problems with his gearbox.

== Results ==
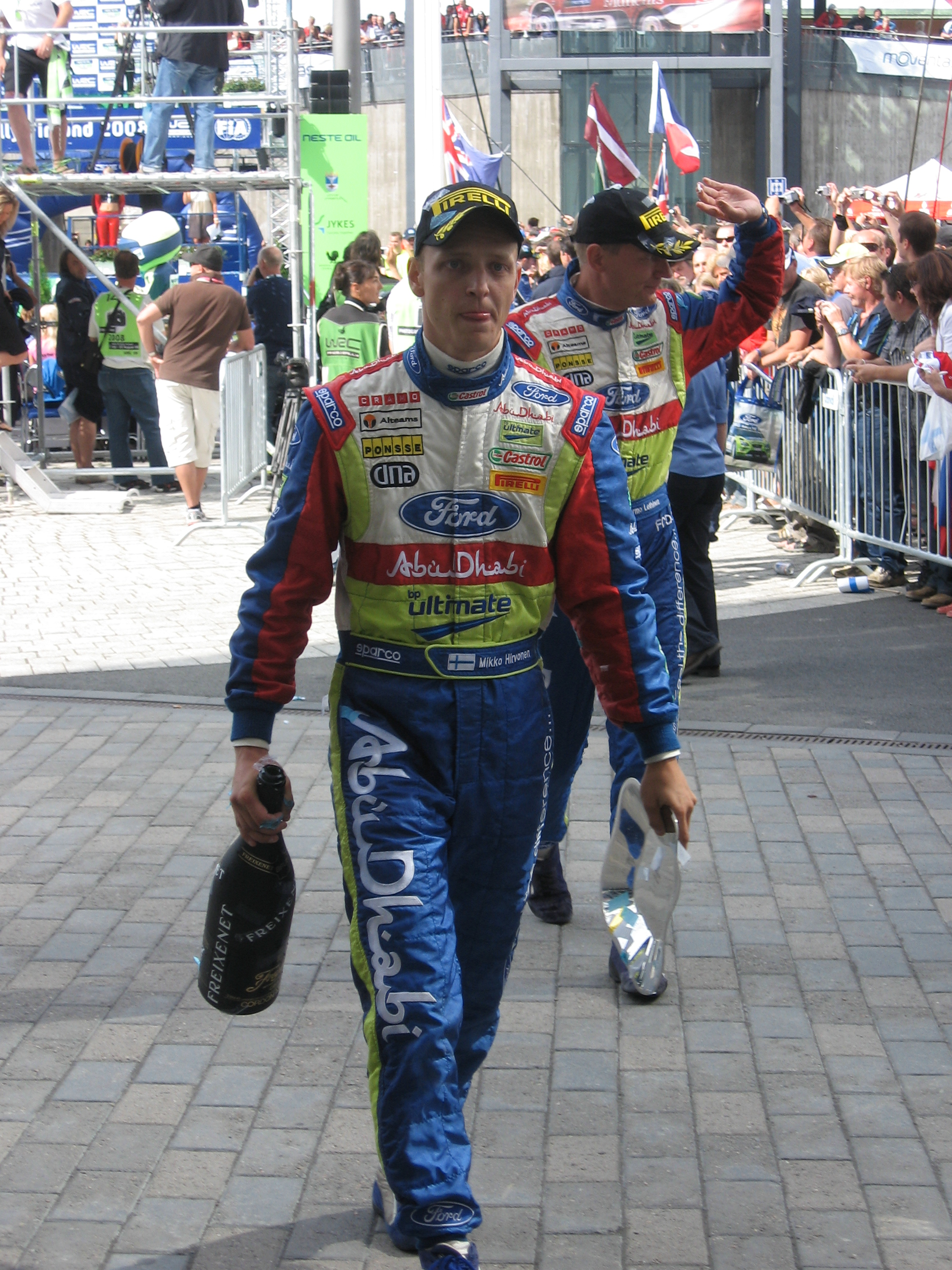
Mikko Hirvonen finished second, only 9 seconds behind winner Loeb.

Pos.	Driver	Co-driver	Car	Time	Difference	Points
WRC
1.	(France) Sébastien Loeb	(Monaco) Daniel Elena	Citroën C4 WRC	2:54:05.5	0.0	10
2.	(Finland) Mikko Hirvonen	(Finland) Jarmo Lehtinen	Ford Focus RS WRC 2007	2:54:14.5	+9.0	8
3.	(Australia) Chris Atkinson	(Belgium) Stéphane Prévot	Subaru Impreza WRC 2008	2:57:22.5	+3:17.0	6
4.	(Spain) Dani Sordo	(Spain) Marc Marti	Citroën C4 WRC	2:57:36.4	+3:30.9	5
5.	(Norway) Henning Solberg	(Norway) Cato Menkerud	Ford Focus RS WRC 2007	2:58:03.2	+3:57.7	4
6.	(Norway) Petter Solberg	(United Kingdom) Phill Mills	Subaru Impreza WRC 2008	2:58:09.6	+4:04.1	3
7.	(Finland) Matti Rantanen	(Finland) Jan Lönegren	Ford Focus RS WRC 2006	3:00:16.6	+6:11.1	2
8.	(Finland) Toni Gardemeister	(Finland) Tomi Tuominen	Suzuki SX4 WRC	3:02:24.2	+8:18.7	1
JWRC
1. (21.)	(Czech Republic) Martin Prokop	(Czech Republic) Jan Tománek	Citroën C2 S1600	3:17:52.2	0.0	10
2. (22.)	(Sweden) Patrik Sandell	(Sweden) Emil Axelsson	Renault Clio S1600	3:18:09.7	+17.5	8
3. (23.)	(Poland) Michal Kosciuszko	(Poland) Maciek Szczepaniak	Suzuki Swift S1600	3:19:26.9	+1:34.7	6
4. (29.)	(Germany) Aaron Nikolai Burkart	(Germany) Michael Koelbach	Citroën C2 S1600	3:26:24.7	+8:32.5	5
5. (31.)	(Republic of Ireland) Shaun Gallagher	(Republic of Ireland) Paul Kiely	Citroën C2 S1600	3:29:36.6	+11:44.4	4
6. (34.)	(Netherlands) Kevin Abbring	(Belgium) Erwin Mombaerts	Renault Clio R3	3:32:23.9	+14:31.7	3
7. (35.)	(Luxembourg) Gilles Schammel	(Belgium) Renaud Jamoul	Renault Clio R3	3:35:40.1	+17:47.9	2
8. (41.)	(Netherlands) Hans Weijs Jr.	(Netherlands) Hans Van Goor	Citroën C2 R2	3:40:30.9	+22:38.7	1
PWRC
1. (13.)	(Finland) Juho Hänninen	(Finland) Mikko Markkula	Mitsubishi Lancer Evolution IX	3:08:38.1	0.0	10
2. (14.)	(Sweden) Patrik Flodin	(Sweden) Göran Bergsten	Mitsubishi Lancer Evolution IX	3:11:08.3	+2:30.2	8
3. (15.)	(Finland) Jussi Välimäki	(Finland) Jarkko Kalliolepo	Mitsubishi Lancer Evolution IX	3:11:51.7	+3:13.6	6
4. (17.)	(Finland) Jari Ketomaa	(Finland) Miika Teiskonen	Subaru Impreza WRX STI	3:13:53.6	+5:15.5	5
5. (18.)	(Sweden) Oscar Svedlund	(Sweden) Björn Nilson	Subaru Impreza WRX STI	3:14:40.5	+6:02.4	4
6. (24.)	(Japan) Fumio Nutahara	(United Kingdom) Daniel Barritt	Mitsubishi Lancer Evolution IX	3:21:41.6	+13:03.5	3
7. (25.)	(Finland) Jussi Tiippana	(Finland) Marko Salminen	Subaru Impreza WRX STI	3:22:01.1	+13:23.0	2
8. (28.)	(Russia) Evgeny Aksakov	(Estonia) Aleksander Kornilov	Mitsubishi Lancer Evolution IX	3:26:10.7	+17:32.6	1

== Special stages ==
All dates and times are EEST (UTC+3).

Day	Stage	Time	Name	Length	Winner	Time	Avg. spd.	Rally leader
1 (31 JUL/1 AUG)	SS1	19:45	Killeri 1	2.06 km	(France) S. Loeb	1:20.5	92.1 km/h	(France) S. Loeb
1 (31 JUL/1 AUG)	SS2	07:30	Vellipohja 1	17.16 km	(France) S. Loeb (Finland) M. Hirvonen	8:16.9	124.3 km/h	(France) S. Loeb
1 (31 JUL/1 AUG)	SS3	08:26	Mokkipera 1	11.38 km	(France) S. Loeb	5:30.5	124.0 km/h	(France) S. Loeb
1 (31 JUL/1 AUG)	SS4	09:09	Palsankyla 1	13.90 km	(France) S. Loeb	7:12.7	115.6 km/h	(France) S. Loeb
1 (31 JUL/1 AUG)	SS5	11:47	Vellipohja 2	17.16 km	(France) S. Loeb	8:09.9	126.1 km/h	(France) S. Loeb
1 (31 JUL/1 AUG)	SS6	12:43	Mokkipera 2	11.38 km	(France) S. Loeb (Finland) M. Hirvonen	5:28.8	124.6 km/h	(France) S. Loeb
1 (31 JUL/1 AUG)	SS7	13:26	Palsankyla 2	13.90 km	(France) S. Loeb	7:07.8	117.0 km/h	(France) S. Loeb
1 (31 JUL/1 AUG)	SS8	16:18	Urria	12.65 km	(Finland) M. Hirvonen	6:00.5	126.3 km/h	(France) S. Loeb
1 (31 JUL/1 AUG)	SS9	16:50	Lautapera	7.87 km	(France) S. Loeb	3:52.4	121.9 km/h	(France) S. Loeb
1 (31 JUL/1 AUG)	SS10	17:29	Jukojarvi	22.18 km	(France) S. Loeb	10:37.2	125.3 km/h	(France) S. Loeb
1 (31 JUL/1 AUG)	SS11	20:00	Killeri 2	2.06 km	(France) S. Loeb	1:20.0	92.7 km/h	(France) S. Loeb
2 (2 AUG)	SS12	07:13	Himos	15.35 km	(Finland) M. Hirvonen	8:37.3	106.8 km/h	(France) S. Loeb
2 (2 AUG)	SS13	08:09	Hirvimaki	10.67 km	(France) S. Loeb	5:47.7	110.5 km/h	(France) S. Loeb
2 (2 AUG)	SS14	08:34	Surkee 1	14.80 km	(France) S. Loeb	8:03.4	110.2 km/h	(France) S. Loeb
2 (2 AUG)	SS15	10:46	Leustu	21.43 km	(Finland) M. Hirvonen	10:12.4	126.0 km/h	(France) S. Loeb
2 (2 AUG)	SS16	11:45	Kakaristo 1	20.09 km	(Finland) J. Latvala	10:43.2	112.4 km/h	(France) S. Loeb
2 (2 AUG)	SS17	12:26	Kaipolanvuori	13.64 km	(Finland) J. Latvala	7:06.6	115.1 km/h	(France) S. Loeb
2 (2 AUG)	SS18	13:31	Surkee 2	14.80 km	(France) S. Loeb	7:55.9	112.0 km/h	(France) S. Loeb
2 (2 AUG)	SS19	16:13	Kakaristo 2	20.09 km	(Finland) M. Hirvonen	10:34.7	113.0 km/h	(France) S. Loeb
2 (2 AUG)	SS20	17:03	Juupajoki	21.13 km	(Finland) J. Latvala	10:57.4	115.7 km/h	(France) S. Loeb
2 (2 AUG)	SS21	17:56	Väärinmaja	16.25 km	(France) S. Loeb	8:22.5	116.4 km/h	(France) S. Loeb
3 (3 AUG)	SS22	09:38	Lankamaa	23.09 km	(Finland) M. Hirvonen (France) S. Loeb	11:11.0	123.9 km/h	(France) S. Loeb
3 (3 AUG)	SS23	10:44	Hannula	10.92 km	(Finland) J. Latvala	5:43.8	114.3 km/h	(France) S. Loeb
3 (3 AUG)	SS24	12:02	Ruuhimaki	6.46 km	(Norway) P. Solberg	3:12.9	120.6 km/h	(France) S. Loeb

== Championship standings after the event ==
=== Drivers' championship ===
Pos	Driver	MON (Monaco)	SWE (Sweden)	MEX (Mexico)	ARG (Argentina)	JOR (Jordan)	ITA (Italy)	GRC (Greece)	TUR (Turkey)	FIN (Finland)	GER (Germany)	NZL (New Zealand)	ESP (Spain)	FRA (France)	JPN (Japan)	GBR (United Kingdom)	Pts
1	(Finland) Mikko Hirvonen	2	2	4	5	1	2	3	1	2							67
2	(France) Sébastien Loeb	1	Ret.	1	1	10	1	1	3	1							66
3	(Australia) Chris Atkinson	3	21	2	2	3	6	Ret.	13	3							37
4	(Spain) Dani Sordo	11	6	17	3	2	5	5	4	4							35
5	(Finland) Jari-Matti Latvala	12	1	3	15	7	3	7	2	39							34
6	(Norway) Petter Solberg	5	4	12	Ret.	Ret.	10	2	6	6							23
7	(Norway) Henning Solberg	9	13	5	Ret.	4	7	8	5	5							20
8	(Italy) Gigi Galli	6	3	Ret.	7	8	4	Ret.	Ret.	Ret.							17
9	(United Kingdom) Matthew Wilson	10	Ret.	6	Ret.	5	12	6	7	9							12
10	(Argentina) Federico Villagra			7	6	6	14	13	9	Ret.							8
11	(Zimbabwe) Conrad Rautenbach	Ret.	16	16	4	26	13	10	8	10							6
11	(Estonia) Urmo Aava		18			Ret.	8	4	Ret.	16							6
13	(Belgium) François Duval	4															5
14	(Norway) Andreas Mikkelsen		5				Ret.		19	12							4
15	(Finland) Toni Gardemeister	Ret.	7	Ret.	Ret.	Ret.	Ret.	9	Ret.	8							3
16	(France) Jean-Marie Cuoq	7															2
16	(Finland) Matti Rantanen									7							2
18	(Sweden) Per-Gunnar Andersson	8	Ret.	Ret.	24	Ret.	9	11	Ret.	Ret.							1
18	(Finland) Juho Hänninen		8							13							1
18	(France) Sébastien Ogier			8		11	22										1
18	(Austria) Andreas Aigner		31		8			14	11	Ret.							1
Pos	Driver	MON (Monaco)	SWE (Sweden)	MEX (Mexico)	ARG (Argentina)	JOR (Jordan)	ITA (Italy)	GRC (Greece)	TUR (Turkey)	FIN (Finland)	GER (Germany)	NZL (New Zealand)	ESP (Spain)	FRA (France)	JPN (Japan)	GBR (United Kingdom)	Pts

Key
Colour	Result
Gold	Winner
Silver	2nd place
Bronze	3rd place
Green	Points finish
Blue	Non-points finish
Blue	Non-classified finish (NC)
Purple	Did not finish (Ret)
Black	Excluded (EX)
Black	Disqualified (DSQ)
White	Did not start (DNS)
White	Cancelled (C)
Blank	Withdrew entry from the event (WD)

=== Manufacturers' championship ===
Rank	Team	Event															Total points
Rank	Team	MON (Monaco)	SWE (Sweden)	MEX (Mexico)	ARG (Argentina)	JOR (Jordan)	ITA (Italy)	GRC (Greece)	TUR (Turkey)	FIN (Finland)	GER (Germany)	NZL (New Zealand)	ESP (Spain)	FRA (France)	JPN (Japan)	GBR (United Kingdom)	Total points
1	(United Kingdom) BP Ford World Rally Team	8	18	11	7	13	14	10	18	9	-	-	-	-	-	-	108
2	(France) Citroën Total World Rally Team	11	4	10	16	9	14	15	11	15	-	-	-	-	-	-	105
3	(Japan) Subaru World Rally Team	10	6	9	8	6	3	8	3	9	-	-	-	-	-	-	62
4	(United Kingdom) Stobart M-Sport Ford	8	8	3	3	7	5	3	4	4	-	-	-	-	-	-	45
5	(Argentina) Munchi's Ford World Rally Team	0	0	6	4	4	2	0	3	0	-	-	-	-	-	-	19
6	(Japan) Suzuki World Rally Team	2	3	0	1	0	1	3	0	2	-	-	-	-	-	-	12
