= Festspielhaus =

A Festspielhaus or Festival Theatre is a German language term describing a theatre designed for opera or music festivals.

There are several examples of Festival Theatres in the German-speaking world:

- Bayreuth Festspielhaus or the Bayreuth Festival Theatre in Bayreuth, Germany
- Festspielhaus Baden-Baden in Baden-Baden, Germany
- Grosses Festspielhaus (Grand Festival Hall) in Salzburg, Austria
- Kleines Festspielhaus (Little Festival Hall) in Salzburg, Austria
- Festspielhaus St. Pölten in St. Pölten, Austria
- Festspielhaus Hellerau in the district of Hellerau, now part of Dresden, Germany; see info in the German Wikipedia
- FestSpielHaus, in Munich, Germany
