= Hans Gebhard-Elsaß =

German composer (1882–1947)

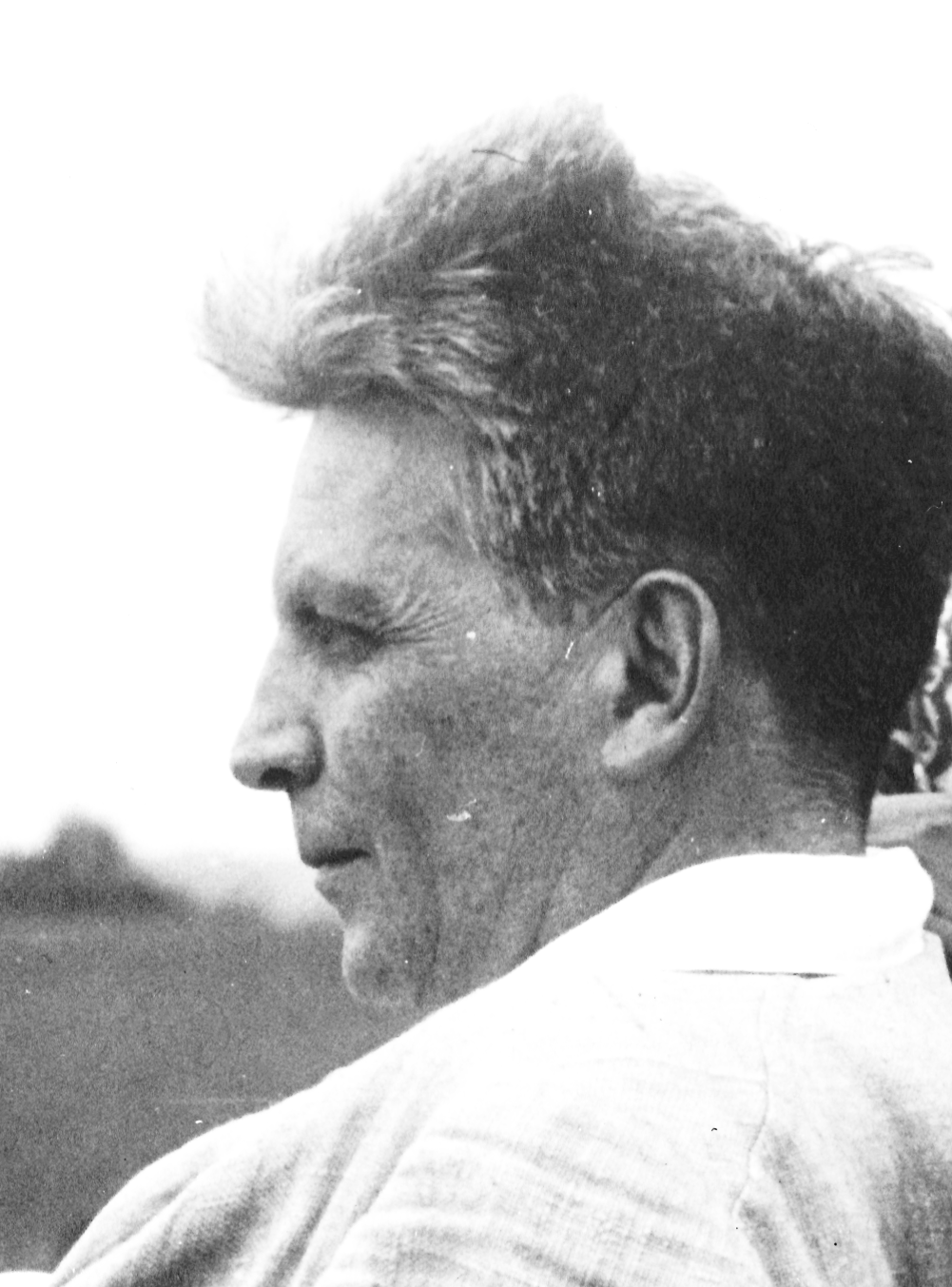
Hans Gebhard-Elsaß, c. 1929

Hans Gebhard-Elsaß (née Hans Julius Gebhard; born 26 September 1882 – 4 October 1947) was a German composer and music educator.

== Family ==
His father was Paul Julius Gebhard, a judge and later military personnel who took part in the Franco-Prussian War. His mother was Mathilde Küss, a pianist from Alsace.

== Biography ==
Gebhard was born in Mülhausen and grew up wanting to become a composer, his father though, wanted him to study art history and Philosophy. After his studies, he was taught violin and cello under Hugo Becker, piano under Gustavo Uzielli and composition and music theory under Iwan Knorr and Robert Kahn.

In 1913, he would then get offered a job as an improvisation teacher by Émile Jaques-Dalcroze at his self-founded school "Festspielhaus Hellerau", but would later quit in 1918. Gebhard in 1941, would teach in Marburg until his death in 1947.

== References and sources ==
=== Sources ===
- Stephani, Hermann (1932). Hans Gebhard-Elsass. Berlin: Schuster & Loeffler.
- Müller, Erich Herrmann (1929). Deutsches Musiker-Lexikon. Dresden: Limpert Verlag.
