= Dish drying cabinet =

Kitchen innovations

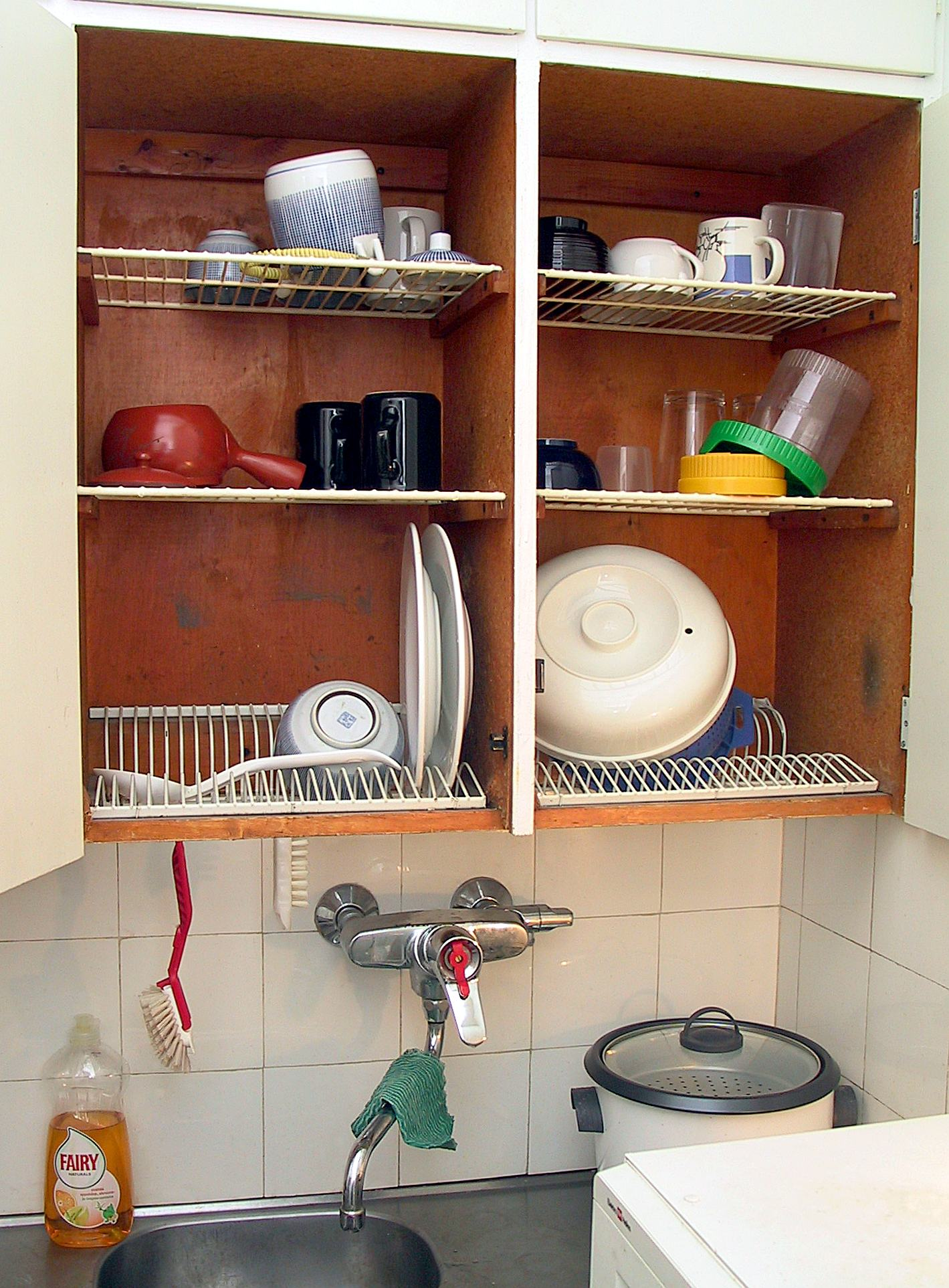
A dish draining cabinet in a Finnish home

A dish drying cabinet (Finnish: astiankuivauskaappi) is a piece of kitchen shelving placed above the sink, with an open bottom and shelves made of steel wire or dowels to allow washed dishes set within to drip into the sink and air dry.

While recorded history of the idea goes back as far as 1876 with a patent application by an American inventor Chandler Vashti, the concept was popularised in Finland in the 1940s by Maiju Gebhard, the head of the household department at the Finnish Work Efficiency Institute. Though Gebhard had introduced a doorless, wall-mounted dish drying rack in her 1930 book Pienviljelijäemännän kotitalousopas, her 1940s cabinet was inspired by a countertop dish drying rack used in Sweden. Gebhard's motivation was to save the time and effort of women; according to her calculations, a Finnish housewife spent 30,450 hours of her life washing dishes, and the dish drying cabinet resulted in a time saving of 50 percent.

Gebhard developed the dish drying cabinet in 1944 and 1945, and the Institute started manufacturing the cabinets and selling the design in 1945. These cabinets were wholly made of wood, and made only in two sizes. Enso-Gutzeit began industrial production of the cabinets in 1948, and in 1954 a rack made from plastic-coated steel wire was introduced. The measurements of the cabinets were standardised in 1982. Dish drying cabinets have become a standard accessory in virtually every Finnish home.

In 1972, an Israeli engineer, Nathan Manor, patented an assembly of superposed trays, for storing and drying dishes, slidably supported on rails and vertically retractable into and out of an encasement. The assembly included springy manipulator members fixed on both sides with a latch element normally engageable with the encasement to retain the assembly within the encasement. The product was called an "Almagov" (אלמגוב, Hebrew: "No towel dry") and became widely used as such.

An improvement to the design of the Almagov was patented by Tal Simhoni in 2012 for a dish drying cabinet installation kit. Simhoni produced a cut out template with a plurality of rigid vertical support members to include holes that receive fasteners for attaching the entire unit to the inside walls of any kitchen cabinet, without limiting the installation to standardized measurements of prepared cabinets.

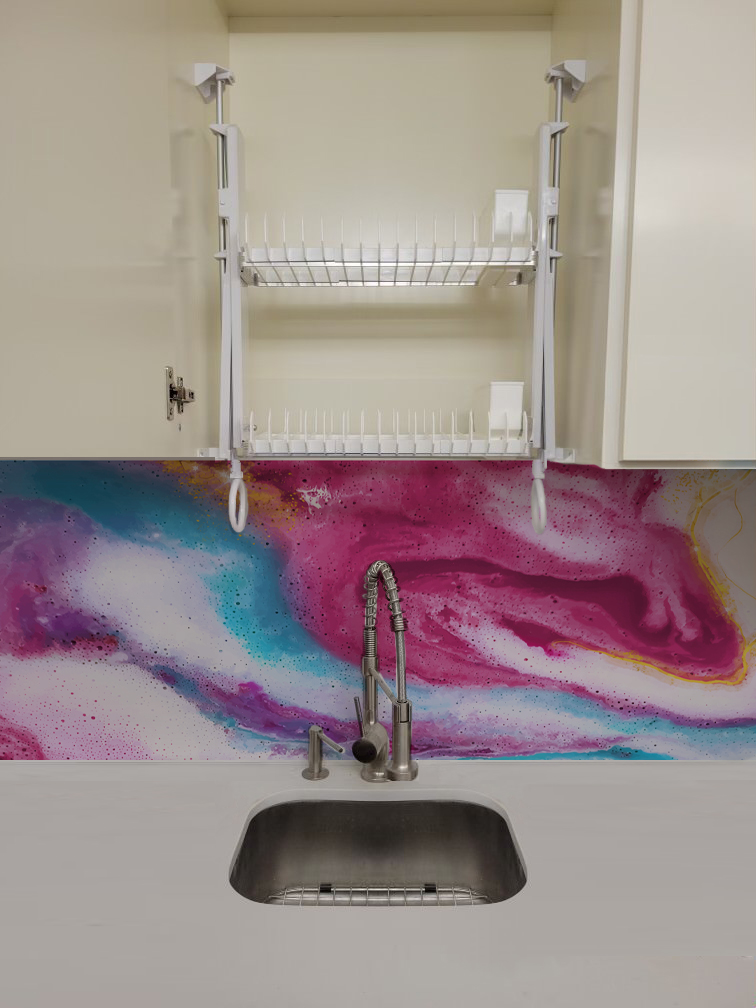
Dish rack mounted in kitchen cabinet

== See also ==
- List of home appliances
