= Kotiliesi =

Finnish women's magazine

- Categories: Family magazine; Women's magazine
- Frequency: Bimonthly
- Publisher: Otava Media Oy
- Founder: Hedvig Gebhard
- Founded: 1922; 103 years ago
- First issue: December 1922
- Company: Otava Group
- Country: Finland
- Based in: Helsinki
- Language: Finnish
- Website: Kotiliesi
- ISSN: 0023-4281

Kotiliesi (Finnish: Fireside) is a bimonthly family and women's magazine published in Helsinki, Finland. Founded in 1922, it is one of the oldest magazines in the country and is the first Finnish magazine addressing housewives.

== History and profile ==
Kotiliesi was first published in December 1922, being the first specialized magazine for housewives in the country. The original motto of the magazine was "Home is society's heart." Its founder and one of the editors was Hedvig Gebhard, who was a journalist and the member of the Finnish Party. She served at the Parliament. The founding publishing company was SanomaWSOY, which started its business activities in the magazine publishing sector with the establishment of Kotiliesi. The headquarters of the magazine is in Helsinki.

The magazine is part of the Otava Group and is published bimonthly by Otava Media Oy. Its former publisher was Yhtyneet Kuvalehdet Oy.

Alli Viherheimo is the first editor-in-chief of Kotiliesi. Mandi Hannula, a woman member of the Parliament, contributed to the magazine in the 1920s. It originally focused on articles about home economics, kitchen architecture and domestic duties. In 1968 the magazine covered articles on the need for reforms related to schooling, education, social security and employment patterns for women. At the end of the 1990s the magazine changed its focus from social topics and policies to personal well-being, families and babies. Later the magazine expanded its coverage to include articles on food, decoration, family business, health among others.

== Circulation ==
Kotiliesi had a circulation of 645,000 copies in 2003. The magazine sold 160,700 copies in 2006. Its circulation fell to 152,700 copies in 2007. It was the third best-selling Finnish women's magazine in 2009 with a circulation of 140,000 copies. Its circulation slightly rose to 141,520 copies in 2010. It sold 137,772 copies in 2011 and 119,105 copies in 2012. The magazine had a circulation of 137,772 copies in 2013, making it the seventh best-selling magazine in Finland.

== See also ==
List of magazines in Finland
