= Maiju Gebhard =

Finnish inventor

{{Expand Finnish|Finnish article title|date=February 2026}}

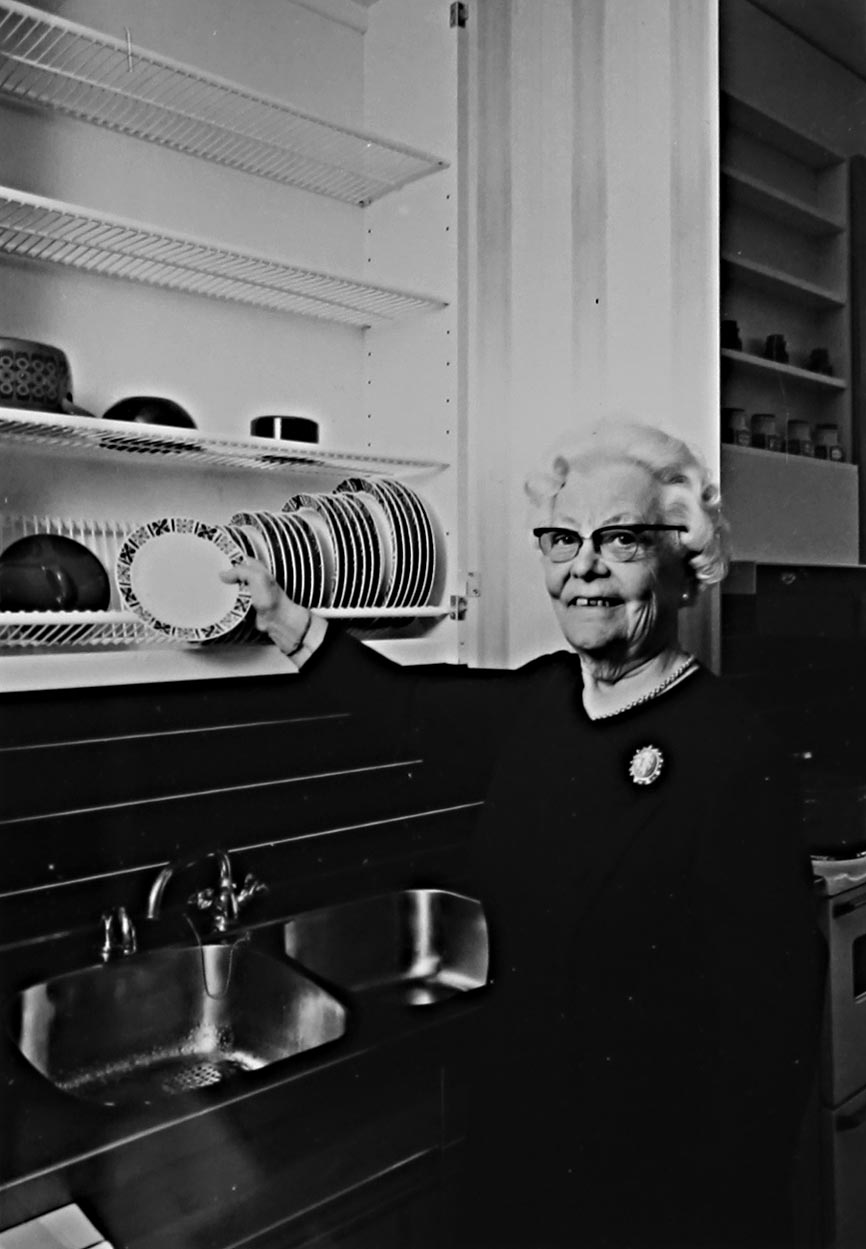
Maiju Gebhard

Maiju Gebhard (September 15, 1896, in Helsinki – July 18, 1986, in Helsinki) was a Finnish inventor who invented the dish drying cabinet as the head of the household department at the Finnish Work Efficiency Institute in 1944 and 1945. She was the only child of economist Hannes Gebhard and politician Hedvig Gebhard.
