= Joose Olavi Hannula =

Finnish colonel and historian

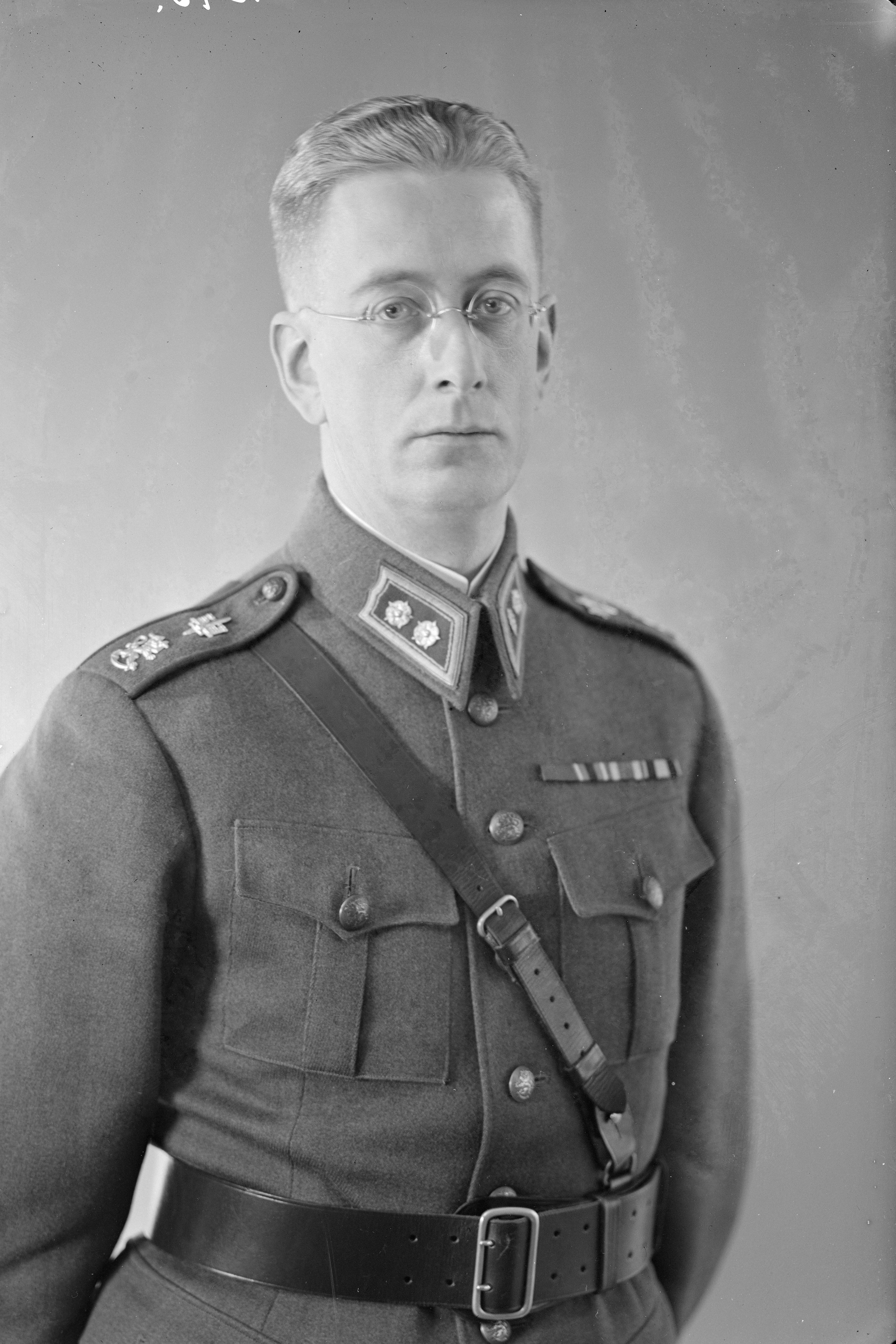
Hannula in 1938

Joose Olavi Hannula (5 September 1900 – 12 June 1944) was a Finnish colonel and historian.

Hannula was born in Turku. After studying at a military college in the 1920s, he joined the Finnish army, serving in the Uusimaa regiment and as a first division staff officer. He was a lecturer in the history of war at Finland's academy of military sciences from 1927 to 1939. He returned to active service as the commanding officer of a regiment and a brigade, and died at Salla in an air raid during the Continuation War of 1941–1944.

== Bibliography ==
- Clausewitz sotateoreetikkona (1927)
- Napuen taistelu (1929)
- Itäarmeijan operaatioiden suunnittelu ja johto v. 18 (1932)
- Sotataidon historia (3 parts, 1933)
- Maailmansodan historia (2 parts, 1935–1936)
- Hakkapeliittoja ja karoliineja (1939)
- Suomi taistelee (3 parts, with B. Fagerström och B. Sandberg, 1940)
