= FestSpielHaus =

Coordinates: 48°06′32″N 11°38′34″E

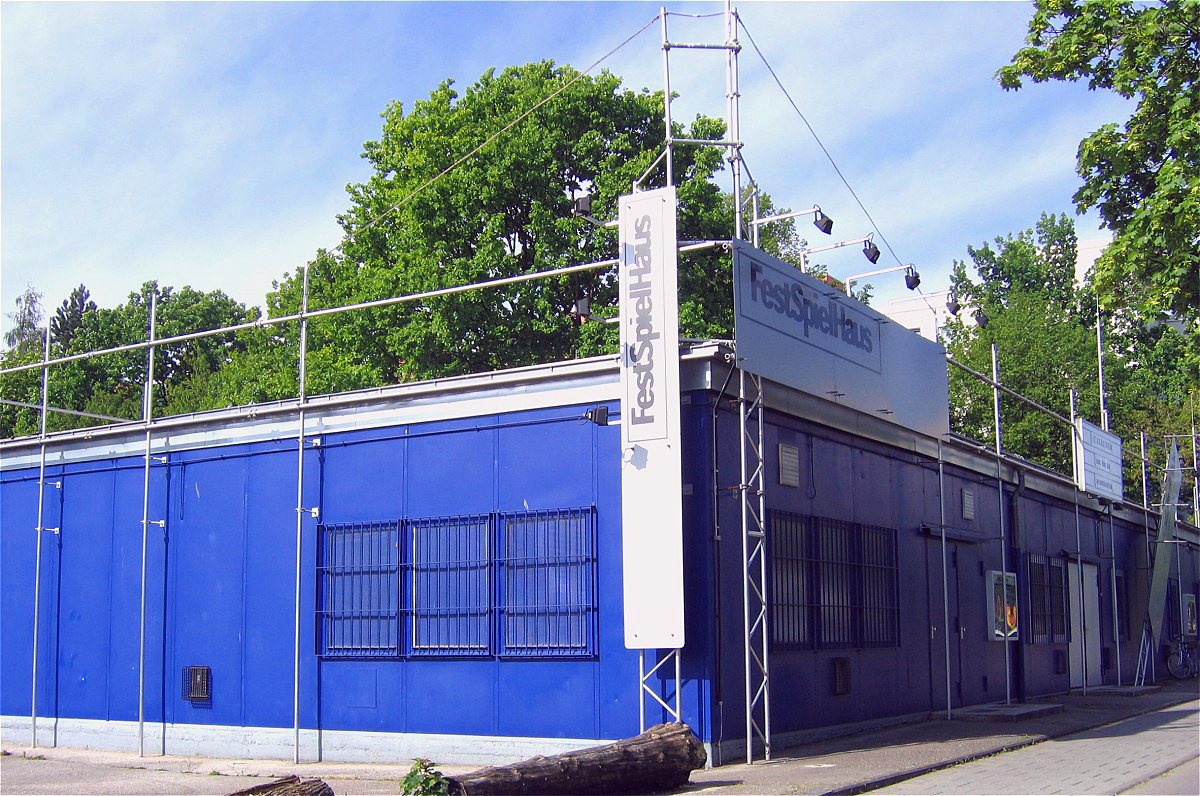
An image of FestSpielHaus

FestSpielHaus is a theatre in Munich, Bavaria, Germany.
