= Hannes Gebhard =

Finnish economist, cooperative movement activist and politician

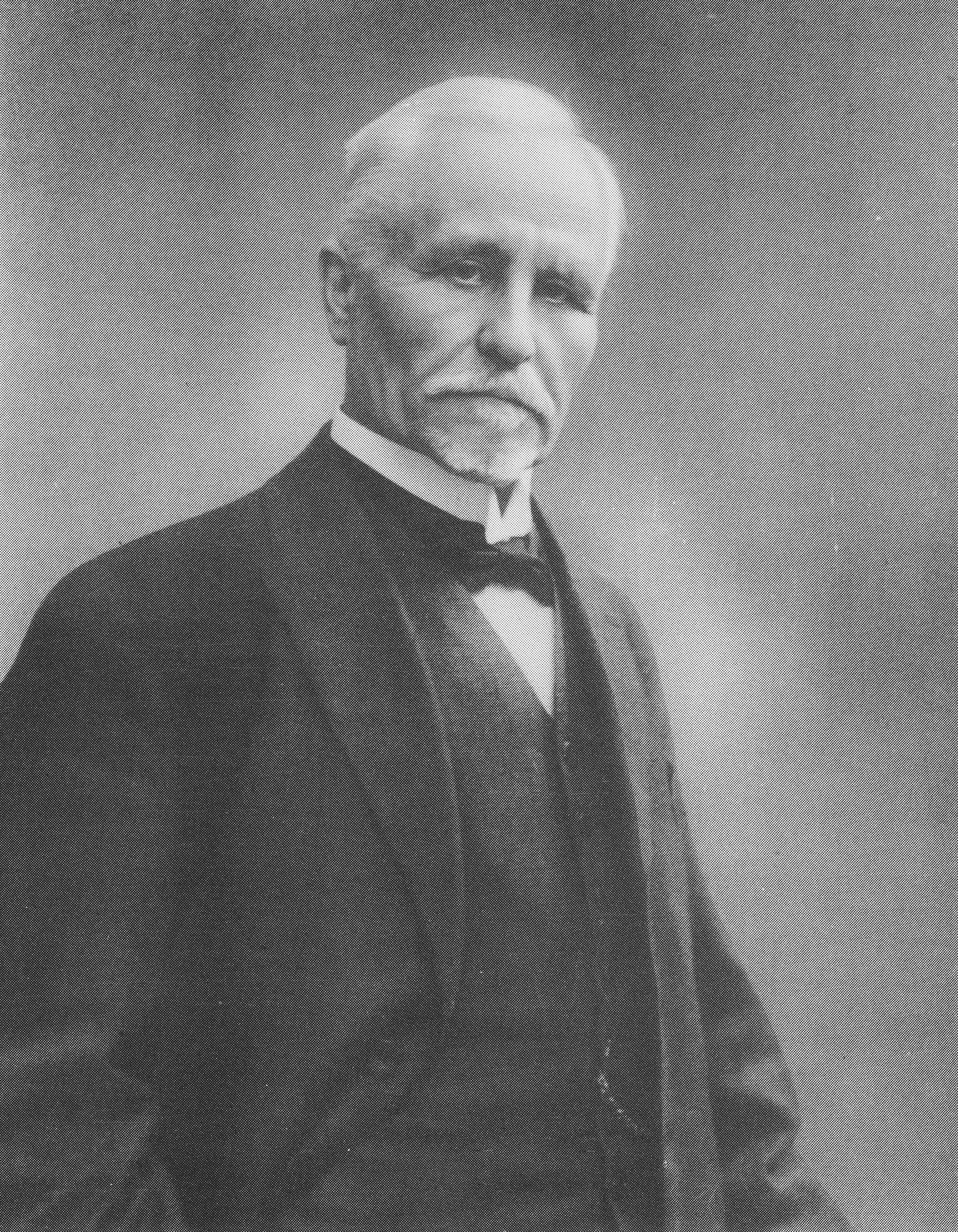
Hannes Gebhard

Hannes Gebhard (8 April 1864 – 23 February 1933) was a Finnish economist, cooperative movement activist and politician. He was a member of the Parliament of Finland from 1907 to 1909, representing the Finnish Party. He was born in Kemijärvi, and was married to Hedvig Gebhard. They had a daughter, the inventor Maiju Gebhard.

He is buried in the Hietaniemi Cemetery in Helsinki.
