= Hedvig Gebhard =

Finnish journalist and politician

Hedvig Maria Gebhard
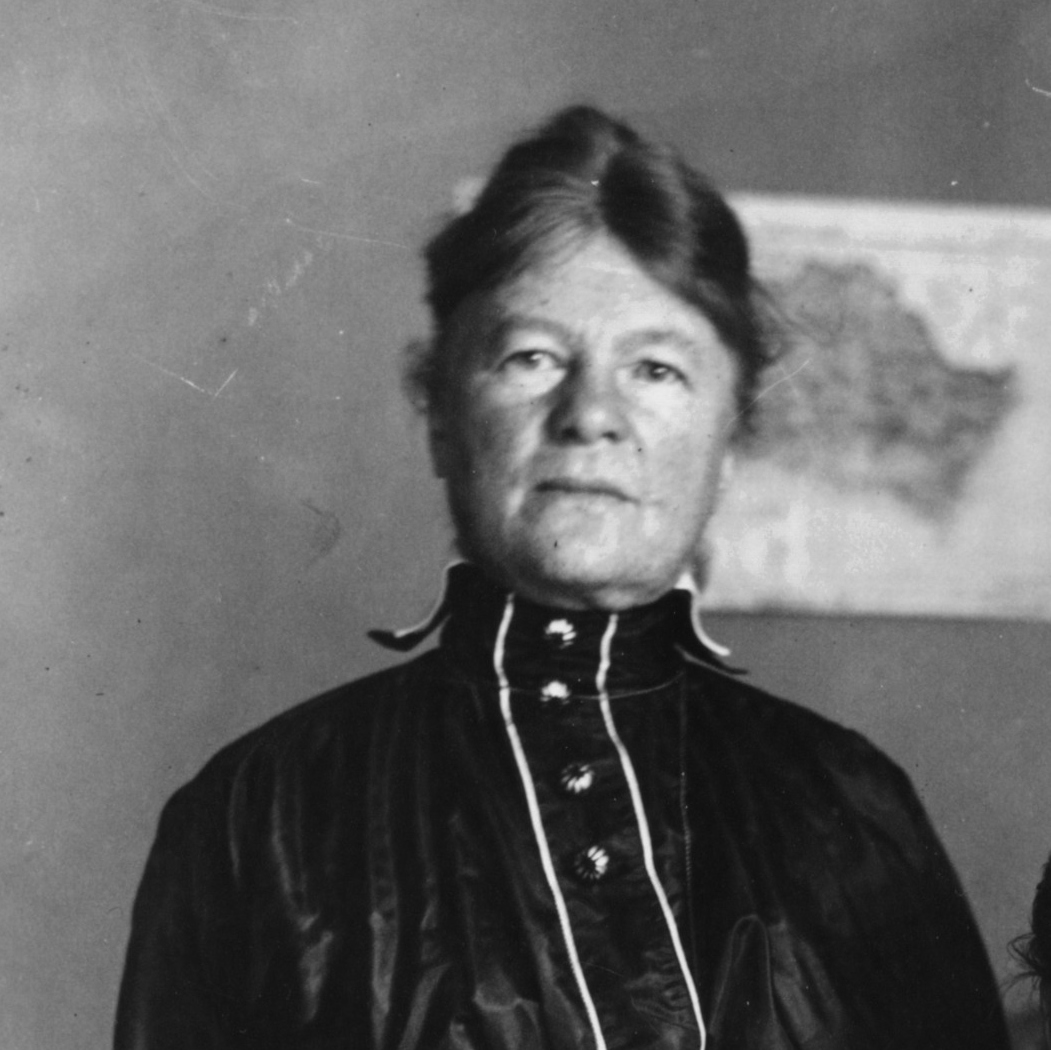
- Member of Parliament Hedvig Gebhard in 1910
- Born: Hedvig Silén; 14 December 1867; Turku, Finland
- Died: 13 January 1961 (aged 93); Helsinki, Finland
- Education: Uppsala University
- Occupations: Journalist and politician
- Known for: Member, Parliament of Finland
- Spouse: Hannes Gebhard
- Children: Maiju Gebhard

Hedvig Maria Gebhard (née Silén; 14 December 1867 in Turku – 13 January 1961 in Helsinki) was a Finnish journalist and politician. She was an elected member of the Parliament of Finland, representing the Finnish Party from 1907 to 1909 and the National Coalition Party from 1919 to 1922 and again from 1924 to 1929.

== Life and work ==
Born in Turku, Finland, Hedvig Gebhard came from a Swedish-speaking home. Her father was August Oskar Silén who began life as a poor shoemaker but made his fortune by virtue of hard work. Her mother was Hedvig Josephina Palmberg.

Hedvig, also called Heddi, could not graduate from school in Finland because they were restricted to boys at the time, so she continued her studies at the Lyceum for girls in Stockholm, Sweden. She graduated from nearby Uppsala University in 1889.

After graduation, she moved to Helsinki to continue her studies and became a student of the "Finnish-minded history master" Hannes Gebhard, with whom she fell in love and married in February 1891. She soon became a citizen of Finland.

=== Politician ===
In politics, Gebhard was primarily an advocate for families and for the domestic economy. As an advocate for women, she co-founded the Union, the Women's Affairs Association in Finland. She was active in the Union for several decades and became acquainted with other activists including Miina Sillanpää, who became her friend and parliamentary colleague.

In 1907, Gebhard (and Sillanpää) were among the first 19 female members elected to the Parliament of Finland. Her husband was also elected to Parliament that year.

=== Journalist ===
She had planned to become a journalist but found it impossible to enter the newspaper industry until 1922 when Kotiliesi, a magazine concerning women and homes, made her the chairperson of its editorial staff. Kotiliesi was first published in 1923 and Gebhard continued to be part of the editorial staff for more than forty years, until her death in 1961.

=== Personal life ===
She was married to the economist Hannes Gebhard; they had a daughter, the inventor Maiju Gebhard.

== Selected memberships ==
- Finnish Women's Association (chairman)
- Nordic Committee for Women's Affairs (chair)
- Finnish Committee of the International Voting Rights Association (Chairman)
- Helsinki Cooperative District Council (Chairman)
- Board of the Home Teachers Association (Chairman)
- SOK Orphanage Board (Chairman)
