= Mandi Hannula =

Finnish politician (1880–1952)

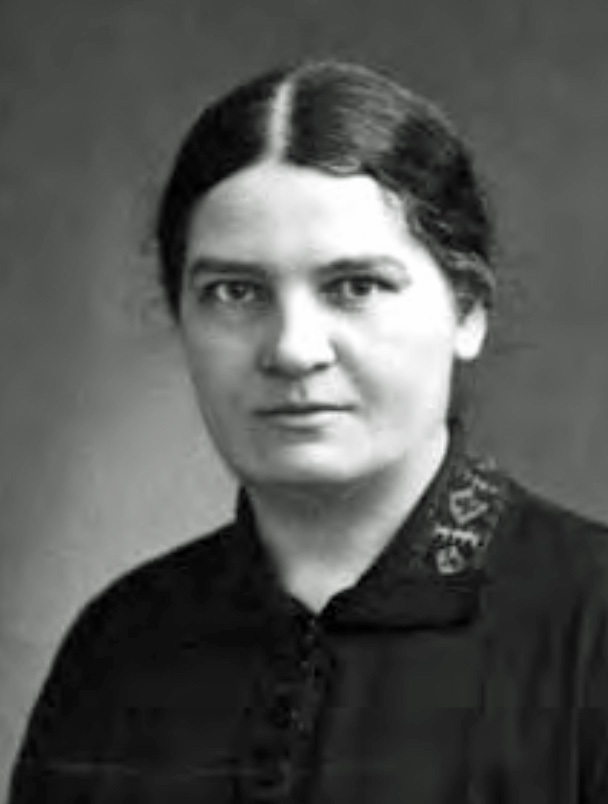
Mandi Hannula

Amanda (Mandi) Hannula (25 March 1880, in Huittinen – 9 January 1952) was a Finnish schoolteacher and politician. She was a member of the Parliament of Finland from 1919 to 1930 and again from 1936 to 1945, representing the National Progressive Party. She also contributed to the family magazine Kotiliesi.
