= Johann Maass =

German psychologist (1766–1823)

Johann Gebhard Ehrenreich Maass (German: Maaß; February 26, 1766 – December 23, 1823) was a German psychologist.

Maass was born in 1766 in Krottendorf near Halberstadt. In 1791 he became an extraordinary professor of philosophy, and in 1798 a full professor. Among his writings on psychology are Versuche: Über die Einbildungskraft (1792; 2nd ed. 1797), Über die Leidenschaften (1805–1807), and Über die Gefühle und Affekte (1811). He died in Halle in 1823.

== Publications ==
- Über die Einbildungskraft (Halle 1792, 2nd ed. 1797),
- Über die Leidenschaften (Halle 1805–1807, 2 vols.),
- Über die Gefühle und Affekte (Halle 1811)
- Grundriß der Rhetorik
- Grundriß der reinen Mathematik
- Grundriß des Naturrechts (Leipzig 1808)
- Ueber Rechte und Verbindlichkeiten überhaupt und die bürgerlichen insbesondere (Halle 1794)
- Sinnverwandte Wörter zur Ergänzung der Eberhardischen Synonymik
- Versuch einer allgemeinen teutschen Synonymik in einem kritisch-philosophischen Wörterbuche der sinnverwandten Wörter der hochdeutschen Mundart. Von Johann August Eberhard und Johann Gebhard Ehrenreich Maaß. (Halle 1826, 3rd ed.)
- Handbuch zur Vergleichung und richtigen Anwendung der sinnverwandten Wörter der deutschen Sprache: 3 vols.
- Ueber die Aehnlichkeit der christlichen mit der neuesten philosophischen Sittenlehre
- Merkwürdige Thatsachen aus Bonaparte's neuester Geschichte
- Kritische Theorie der Offenbarung

Philosophical articles:

- Johann Gebhard Maaß (1788). "Ueber die transcendentale Aesthetik". Philosophisches Magazin. 1 (2): 117–149.
- Johann Gebhard Maaß (1789). "Vorläufige Erklärung des Verfassers der Briefe über die Antinomie der Vernunft, in Rücksicht auf die Recension dieser Briefe in der allgem. Litt. Zeitung". Philosophisches Magazin. 1 (3): 340–343.
- Johann Gebhard Maaß (1789). "Berichtigung eines Urtheils in der allgem. Litt. Zeitung". Philosophisches Magazin. 1 (4): 406–412.
- Johann Gebhard Maaß (1789). "Ueber die Antinomie der reinen Vernunft". Philosophisches Magazin. 1 (4): 469–495.
- Johann Gebhard Maaß and J.A. Eberhard (1789). "Bemerkungen über eine Recension des zweyten Stücks dieses phil. Mag. in der Allg. Litt. Zeit. N. 90. dieses Jahrs". Philosophisches Magazin. 2 (1): 29–52.
- Johann Gebhard Maaß (1789). "Ueber den höchsten Grundsatz der synthetischen Urtheile; in Beziehung auf die Theorie von der mathematischen Gewisheit". Philosophisches Magazin. 2 (2): 186–231.
- Johann Gebhard Maaß (1790). "Ueber den Satz des zureichenden Grundes". Philosophisches Magazin. 2 (2): 173–204.
- Johann Gebhard Maaß (1791). "Zusätze zu der Abhandlung über den höchsten Grundsatz der synthetischen Urtheile". Philosophisches Magazin. 4 (2): 235–253.
- Johann Gebhard Maaß (1792). "Neue Bestätigung des Satzes: daß die Geometrie aus Begriffen beweise". Philosophisches Archiv. 1 (3): 96–99.
- Johann Gebhard Maaß (1792). "Beweis einiger (nicht identischen) mathematischen Sätze aus bloßen Verstandesbegriffen". Philosophisches Archiv. 1 (3): 100–113.
