= Festspielhaus Hellerau =

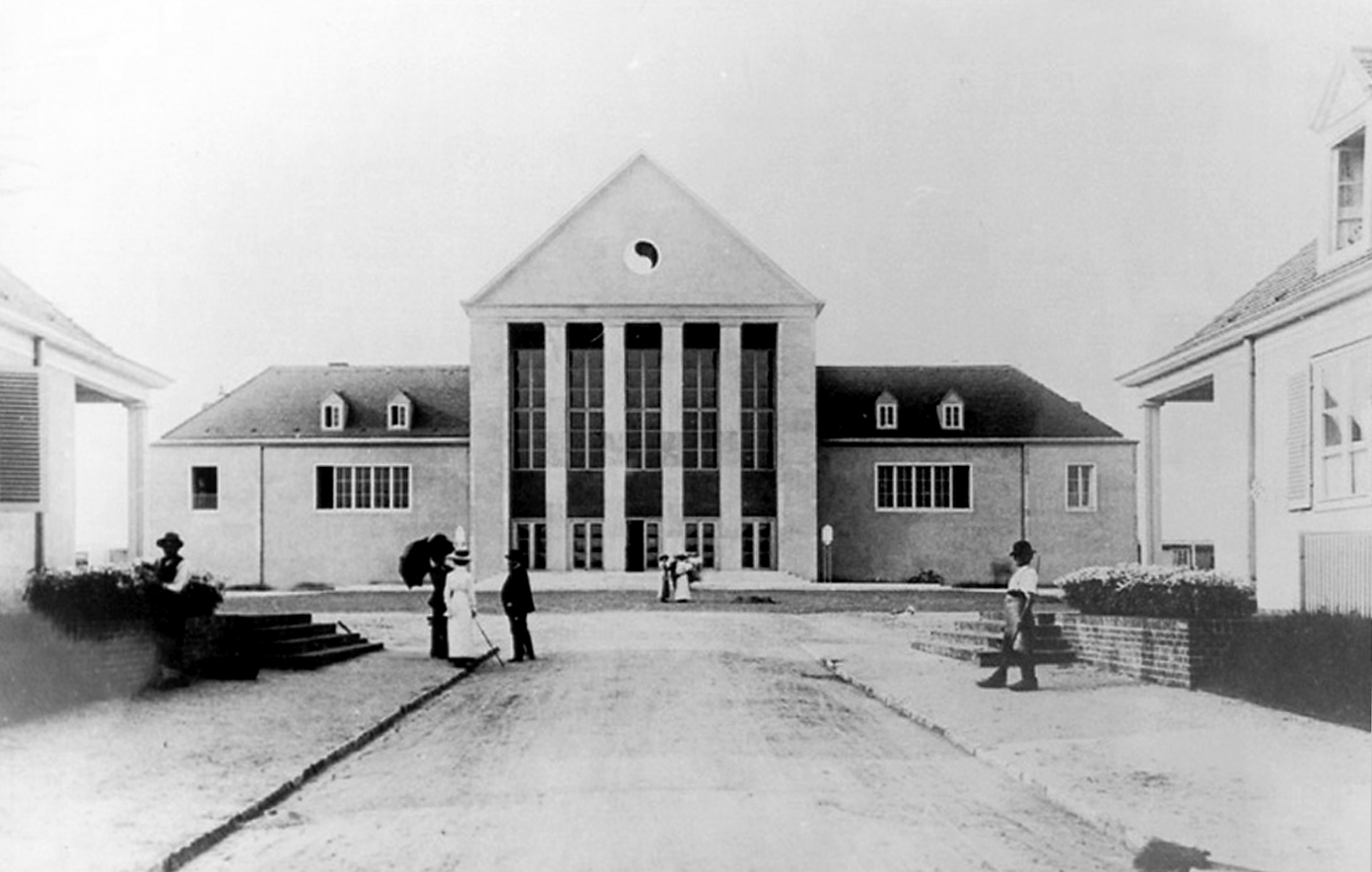
- The Hellerau Festspielhaus, circa 1913.
- Interactive map of Festspielhaus Hellerau
- Address: 56 Karl-Liebknecht Street, D-01109 Dresden, Germany; Dresden; Germany
- Coordinates: 51.113781°N 13.753133°E
- Capacity: 560 seats (1911)
- Type: German Festspielhaus

Construction
- Opened: 1911
- Closed: 1939–2006
- Rebuilt: 1992–2006 and ongoing
- Years active: 1911–1939, 2006–present
- Architect: Heinrich Tessenow

Website
- www.hellerau.org

Festspielhaus Hellerau (English: Hellerau Festival House or Hellerau Theatre) is a theatre/studio building/classroom building located in Hellerau, the famous garden city district of Dresden, Germany. Built in 1911, it was an important center for early modern theatre up until the rise of the Nazi party, World War II and afterward when the area became part of Communist-occupied East Germany. After the German reunification and the departure of the Red Army, efforts were begun to restore the building, then nearly in ruins, to its original grandeur. The theatre was reopened to the public in September 2006 and restoration is currently ongoing.

== Inception and early history, 1909–1939 ==
Adolphe Appia, who was then working with Émile Jaques-Dalcroze, and who had been greatly influenced by his studies of Richard Wagner's music and ideas, designed the theater at Hellerau for Dalcroze's school. Brockett states that it was "the first theatre of modern times to be built without a proscenium arch and with a completely open stage." According to Brockett, Appia designed the theater in 1910 and designed a series of productions for it in 1912 and 1913. The summer programmes at the Festspielhaus Hellerau attracted around 5000 international guests, including leaders in the arts such as George Bernard Shaw, Vaslav Nijinsky, and Konstantin Stanislavski.

== Occupation and decay, 1939–1992 ==
The start of World War II, in 1939, saw the Festpielhaus buildings commandeered by the Nazis and turned into a police academy. It served this function until the end of the war when the Soviet army took control of East Germany. Taking advantage of the fortifications the Germans had added to the property, the Festspielhaus continued to serve various military functions, first as a hospital and later a barracks. Neither the Germans or the Soviets gave much care to preservation of the building; rooms were rebuilt to suit while the Soviets tore down the ying-yang symbol on the front pediment and replaced it with a red star.

By the time the Soviets ultimately left in 1992 the building was in a very poor state. Roofs were caving in with many parts collapsed completely, the exterior stucco was stained and falling off in places and most of the original furnishings had been stripped.

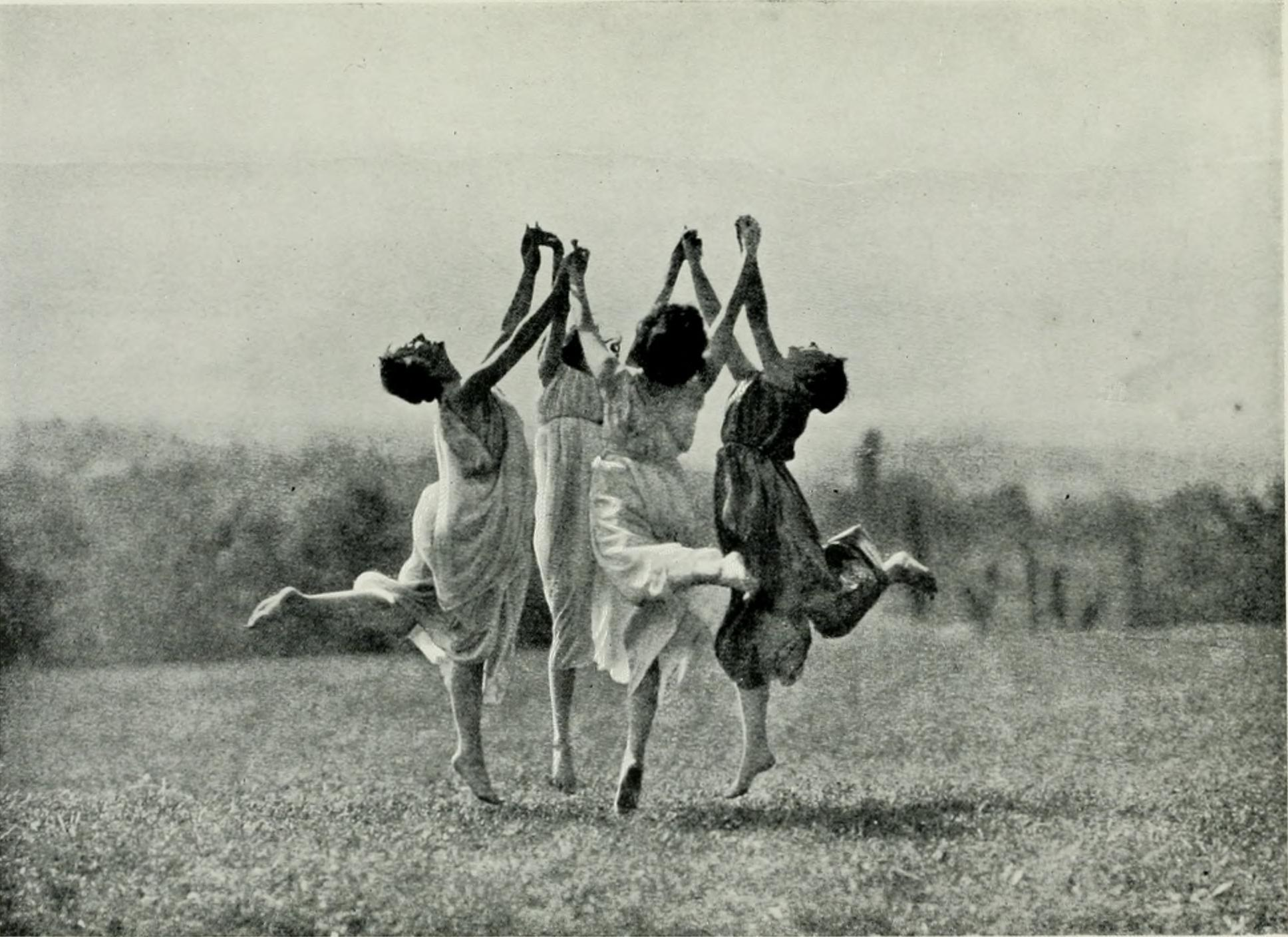
Pupils dancing on the lawn outside the Festspielhaus, 1912

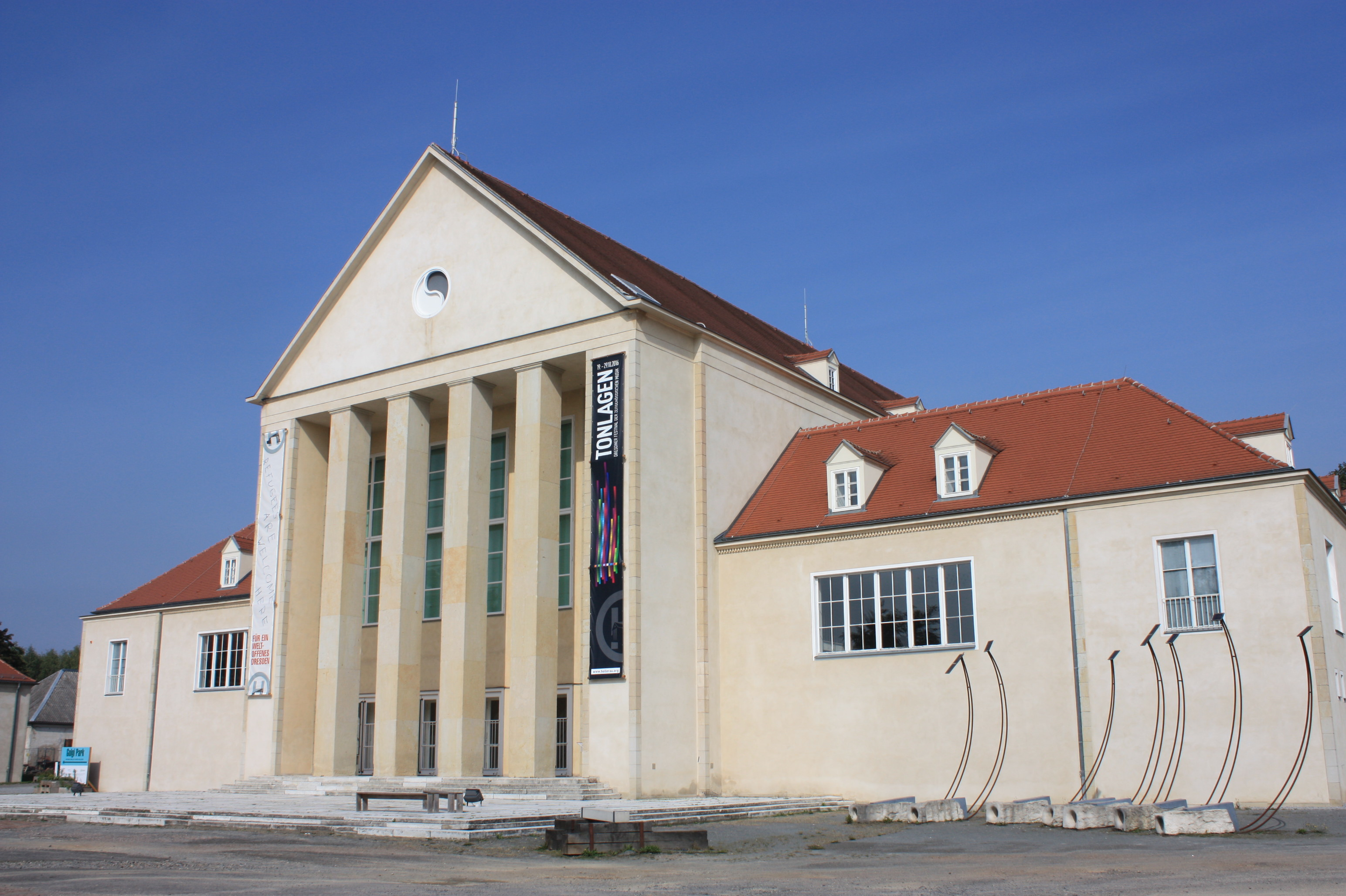

== See also ==
- Adolphe Appia
