= Mikko Hannula =

Mikko Hannula is a Finnish sports commentator and journalist who works for Finland's National Broadcasting Company Yle.

He works both as a real-time play-by-play commentator and makes news flashes for radio (Urheiluradio) and television (Urheiluruutu).

Hannula usually commentates on alpine skiing, track and field, sport wrestling and volleyball.

In 2004 Hannula was awarded the Sports Journalist of Year in Finland. Hannula has said that he likes to use the assistance of color commentators because four eyes can see more than two. Some of the color commentators Hannula has used are Timo Hoivala (volleyball), Pasi Sarkkinen (wrestling) and Juuso Aulanko (alpine skiing).
