= Gebhard Gritsch =

Austrian sports coach and consultant

- Born: 21 December 1956 (age 69); Silz, Tyrol, Austria
- Education: University of Innsbruck; University of Vienna
- Occupations: Sports coach and consultant

Gebhard Gritsch (born 21 December 1956) is an Austrian sports coach and consultant, and from 2009 to 2017, fitness coach and consultant to the Serbian tennis professional Novak Djokovic. Gritsch studied Sports Science and Sports Management at the universities of Innsbruck and Vienna and obtained his master's degree in 1985. In 1994, Gritsch earned his PhD from the University of Vienna, with his sports science based dissertation Handbook for player development: From the talented junior to the tennis professional.

== Career ==
Gritsch has over 20 years of experience in tennis player development, including as national coach in the Philippines and Indonesia. In New Zealand, he worked as head coach for the Central Region, and as consultant to the New Zealand Academy of Sports.

Gritsch worked as Novak Djokovic’s fitness coach and consultant from 2009 to 2017. His role included sports-science-based training and performance management during training and competition.[5][6][7][8]

Gebhard Gritsch provides sports planning expertise to training centres, sports federations and governmental sports organizations.
