= Janne Hannula =

Finnish footballer (born 1982)

Personal information
- Date of birth: 3 January 1982 (age 44)
- Place of birth: Finland
- Height: 1.78 m (5 ft 10 in)
- Position: Defender

Team information
- Current team: JJK
- Number: 3

Senior career*
Years	Team	Apps	(Gls)
2009–	JJK	38	(3)
- * Club domestic league appearances and goals as of 12 October 2009

Janne Hannula (born 3 January 1982) was a Finnish footballer who played for JJK.
