= Théâtre Lyrique =

Former opera company in Paris

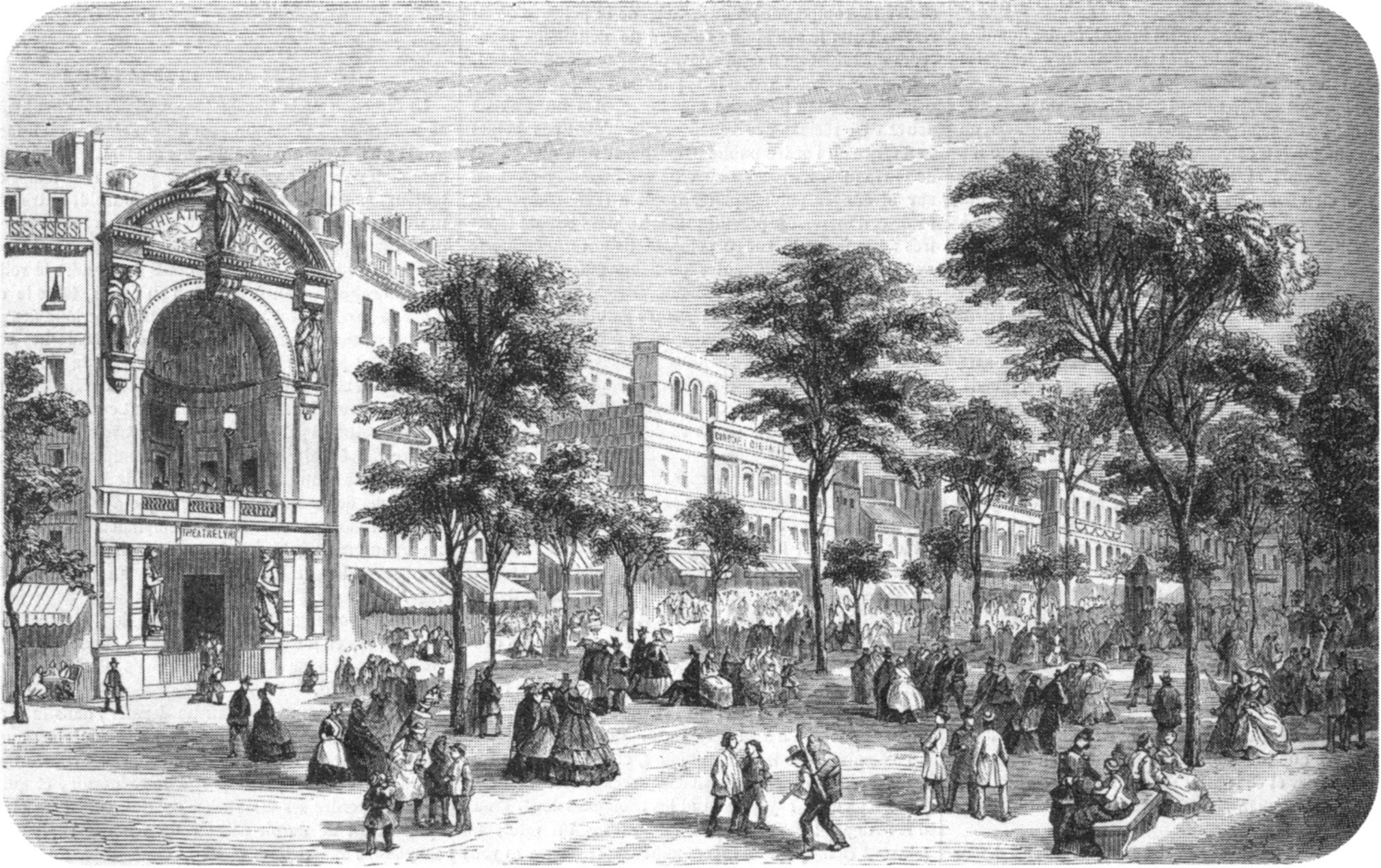
The Théâtre Lyrique on the Boulevard du Temple

The Théâtre Lyrique (French pronunciation: [teɑtʁ liʁik]) was one of four opera companies performing in Paris during the middle of the 19th century (the other three being the Opéra, the Opéra-Comique, and the Théâtre-Italien). The company was founded in 1847 as the Opéra-National by the French composer Adolphe Adam and renamed Théâtre Lyrique in 1852. It used four different theatres in succession, the Cirque Olympique, the Théâtre Historique, the Salle du Théâtre-Lyrique (now the Théâtre de la Ville), and the Salle de l'Athénée, until it ceased operations in 1872.

The diverse repertoire of the company "cracked the strict organization of the Parisian operatic world by breaking away from the principle that institution and genre were of one substance." The company was generally most successful with revivals of foreign works translated into French, particularly operas by Gluck, Mozart, Weber, and Verdi, but probably is most remembered today for having given the first performance in Paris of Wagner's Rienzi, as well as the premieres of operas by French composers, in particular Georges Bizet's Les pêcheurs de perles, Hector Berlioz's Les Troyens à Carthage, Charles Gounod's Roméo et Juliette, and above all Gounod's Faust, the opera performed most often by the Théâtre Lyrique, and still one of the most popular operas throughout the world.

After the company ended operations in 1872 several short-lived companies revived the name, most notably Albert Vizentini's Théâtre National Lyrique (1876–1878), but none were as successful as the original.

== On the boulevard du Temple ==
=== 1852–1854: Jules Seveste ===
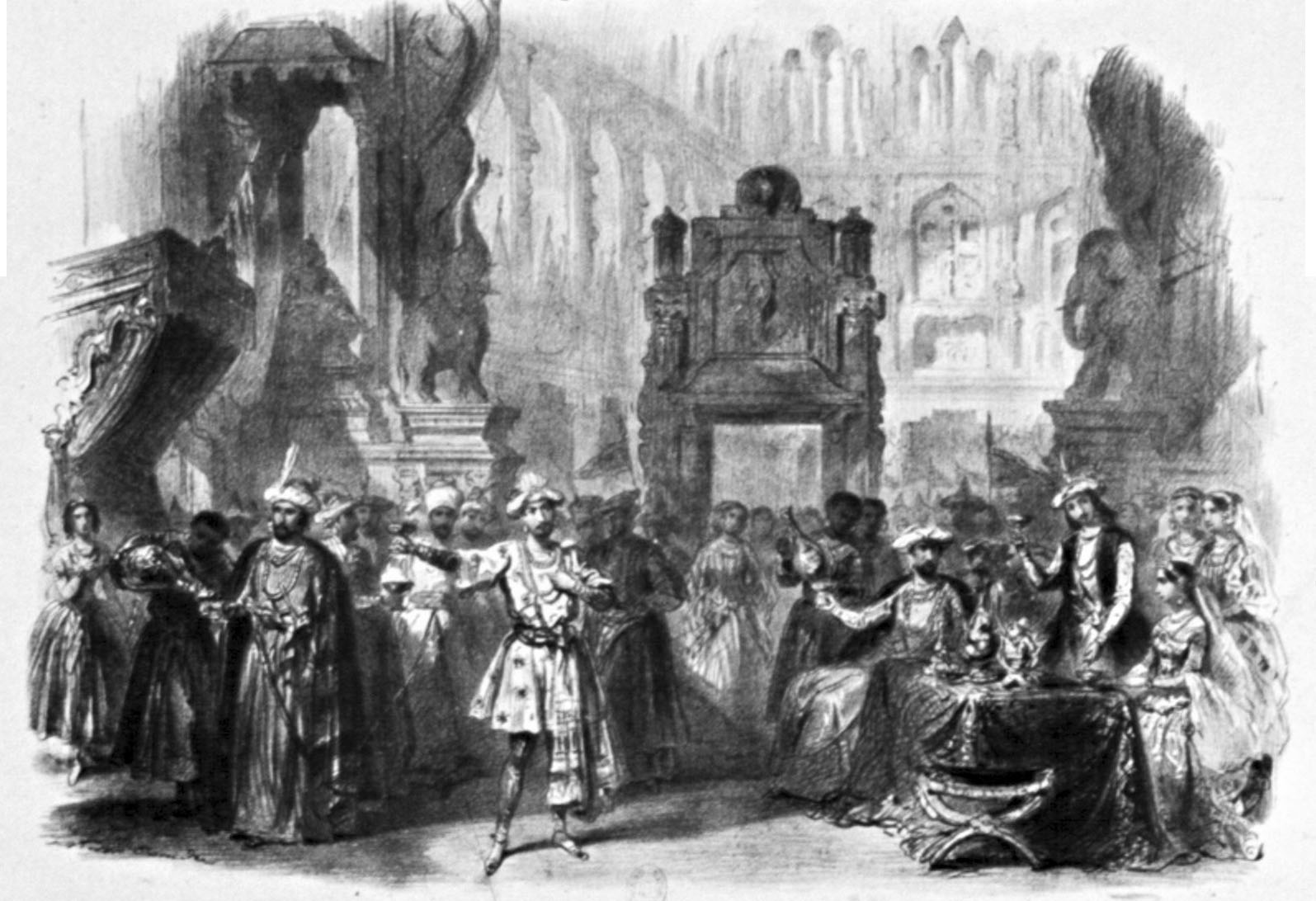
A scene from Si j'étais roi (1854)

The Théâtre Lyrique was created from the Opéra-National at the end of the latter's 1851–1852 season by a simple change of name. It continued to perform at the same venue, the Théâtre Historique on the boulevard du Temple. Jules Seveste, the new director who had taken over after the death of his brother Edmond, opened the season on 4 September 1852 with the premiere of a particularly noteworthy new French opéra comique, Adolphe Adam's three-act Si j'étais roi (If I Were King), which received an especially lavish production. Dual casts were employed so the piece could be performed on successive evenings. Adam's opera was given 66 times before the end of the year, and eventually received a total of 166 performances by the company, the last being in 1863. The 60th performance in December was an especially gala affair, attended by a noted patron of the arts, Princess Mathilde, daughter of Jérôme Bonaparte and cousin of Napoleon III. The latter had just established the Second French Empire, having himself crowned emperor on 2 December. For a boulevard theatre which typically charged a maximum of five or six francs for its most expensive seats, this was indeed an increase in status. Seveste was also fortunate with his second new offering that season, a "trifling" one-act opéra comique by Eugène Gautier called Flore et Zéphire, which was first performed on 2 October 1852 and ultimately presented 126 times by the company.

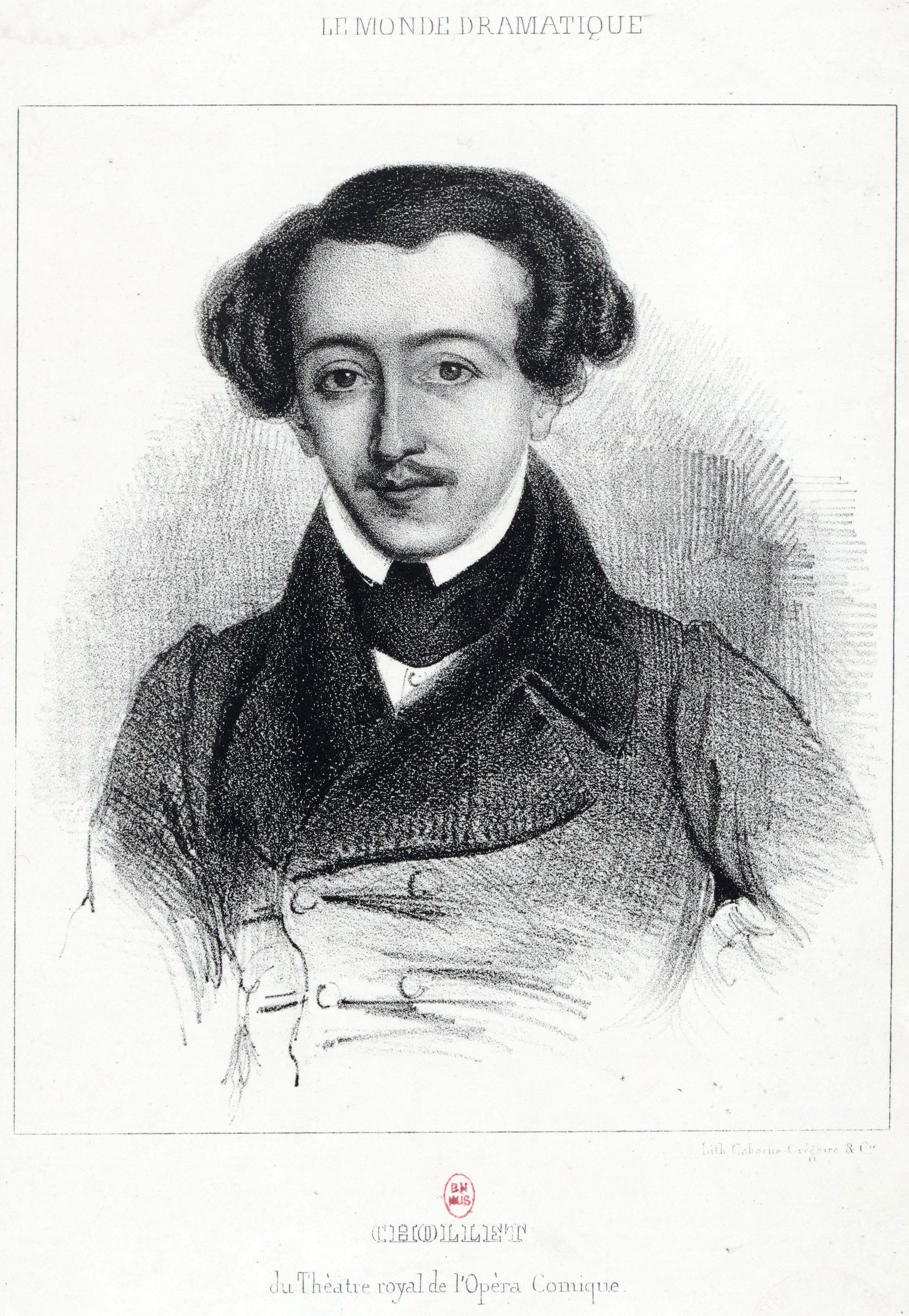
Chollet in 1840

The engagement of the famous tenor Jean-Baptiste Chollet, who had recently returned from London and at 54 was rather far along in his career, received much favorable coverage in the press. His debut with the company was on 3 November in the role of Chapelou in a revival of Adam's Le postillon de Longjumeau, a part which he had created to great acclaim in 1836. The critic Gustave Hécquet wrote that "Chollet has lost nothing of his talent from the old days. He still has his figure, his comic gestures, his delivery (clear and energetic)... You can imagine how he was received in the role in which he always triumphed. It was like a family gathering, a return of the prodigal son...".

On 22 January 1853 it was formally announced that Napoleon III would marry Countess Eugénie de Montijo, and the wedding took place a week later amid the usual festivities. Princess Mathilde may have reported favorably to her relatives of her visit to the Théâtre Lyrique: the Emperor and his new bride attended a performance there on the night of 28 February. The boulevard du Temple was specially lit up and decorated for the occasion, and Seveste received the couple at the foot of the staircase leading up to the auditorium. The program included Flore et Zéphire, Le postillon de Longjumeau, and the premiere of a two-act opéra-ballet, Le lutin de la vallée (The Goblin of the Valley). The last had a libretto by Jules Edouard Alboize de Pujol and Michel Carré and music by Eugène Gautier with insertions of pieces by Adam and Arthur Saint-Léon. Saint-Léon, a "very indifferent" composer, was primarily a dancer and choreographer, but also played violin. For the premiere Saint-Léon had composed and played a violin solo called "Une matinée à la Campagne" ("A morning in the country") in which he imitated all the sounds of a barnyard. It proved to be the most popular piece of the evening, and if he played it for the royal couple, it was probably well received – their musical tastes ran to polkas and waltzes. One of the ballerinas, Marie Guy-Stéphan, whom Saint-Léon had brought with him from the Paris Opera Ballet, received a diamond bracelet from the new Empress as a token of appreciation.

Besides the previously mentioned productions, Seveste's first season included nine other premieres and two additional revivals of opéras comiques, all by French composers, but none of these proved to be quite as successful. Over the summer additional chorus members were auditioned and engaged, and the first violinist and assistant conductor Adolphe Deloffre was promoted to principal conductor. Deloffre would remain in that post until 1868, when he moved to the Opéra-Comique.

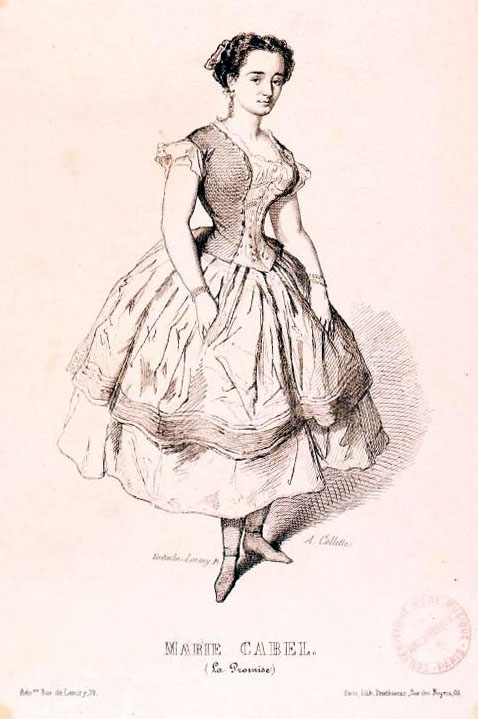
Marie Cabel in La promise (1853)

Seveste's 1853–1854 season continued to introduce many new French works, including a three-act opéra comique by Adolphe Adam called Le bijou perdu (The Lost Jewel), which was first performed on 6 October. A new singer, the 26-year-old Marie Cabel, created the lead soprano role of Toinon and became one of the star attractions of the company. Cabel, who had been discovered as a child by Pauline Viardot, had failed to make much of an impression at the Opéra-Comique in the 1849–1850 season, but she achieved greater success at the Théâtre de la Monnaie in Brussels from 1850 to 1853 and in guest appearances in France at theatres in Lyons and Strassbourg. At the Lyrique she began attracting the "carriage trade", and boxes had to be reserved four or five days in advance. The first 15 performances of the new opera yielded more than 60,000 francs. The Emperor and Empress came to see her just before Christmas. The opera received 40 performances before the end of that year, and a total of 132 by the company.

Cabel also created the role of Corbin in the one-act opéra comique Georgette ou Le moulin de Fontenoy at the Lyrique on 28 November 1853. The music was by the Belgian composer François-Auguste Gevaert, the libretto was by Gustave Vaëz, and the production received 43 performances. Later that season on 16 March she created the role of Marie in the three-act opéra comique La promise. The music was composed by Louis Clapisson, the libretto was by Adolphe de Leuven and Léon-Lévy Brunswick, and it was given a total 60 times that season and the next.

After the season had ended, Lafont organized a troupe consisting of some of the singers in the company and presented a two-month summer season at St James's Theatre in London. Jules Seveste decided to stay in France to prepare for the fall season. In London Cabel was the star, attracting full-houses even in the midst of the summer heat and performing in Adam's Le bijou perdu, Auber's Les diamants de la couronne, and Donizetti's La fille du régiment.

The wheels of the bureaucracy had finally caught up with reality at the Théâtre Lyrique on 21 May 1854, when the Minister of the Interior announced that Jules Seveste was now indeed the legitimate holder of the ten-year license, formerly for the Opéra-National, which had originally been awarded to his brother Edmond in 1851. Unfortunately, Jules Seveste died unexpectedly on 30 June 1854 in Meudon near Paris.

=== 1854–1855: Émile Perrin ===
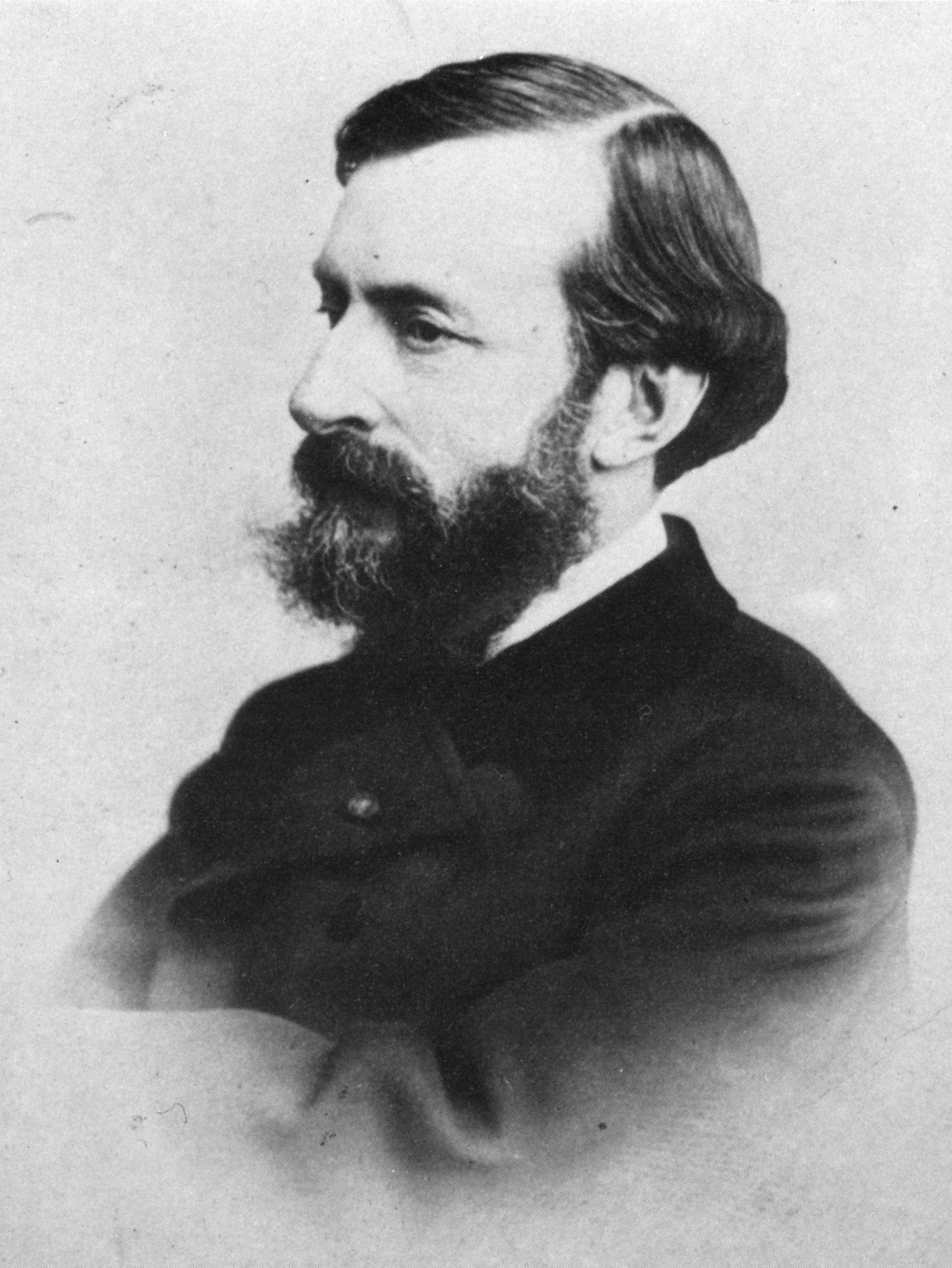
Émile Perrin

Émile Perrin became the new director on 26 July 1854, while also retaining his post as director of the Opéra-Comique. This arrangement created some anxieties within the company regarding potential conflicts of interest between itself and its chief rival. An announcement was made in an attempt to allay these concerns: "Each of the two establishments will have a separate company and special repertory. The Théâtre Lyrique will not be the vassal of its elder brother, on the contrary, every effort will be made to keep up a noble spirit of emulation between the two, which cannot fail to be profitable to the art."

Marie Cabel, having been under contract to Jules Seveste, was now free to leave, and there were reports she might go to the Opéra. Perrin was however successful in signing her to a new contract, and the new season opened on 30 September with Cabel in La promise. Two singers new to the company were also to receive much praise: the mezzo-soprano Pauline Deligne-Lauters, who would later marry Louis Guéymard and have a successful career at the Opéra; and the tenor Léon Achard, who would later create the role of Wilhelm Meister in Ambroise Thomas' Mignon at the Opéra-Comique (with Cabel as Philine).

The terms of the company's cahier des charges were also made somewhat more restrictive at this time, calling for 15 acts of new works per season, at least three by composers previously unperformed in Paris. In addition, Perrin was not allowed to present more than 6 acts by any composer who had already had four or more works staged by the Opéra or the Opéra-Comique.

During Perrin's one full season with the company he produced 11 new French operas and only two revivals. The most successful of the premieres was a three-act opéra comique by Fromental Halévy called Jaguarita l'Indienne (14 May 1855), which eventually received a total of 124 performances. Marie Cabel starred in the title role, and a new tenor, Jules Monjauze, who had previously been an actor at the French Theatre in Saint Petersburg and at the Théâtre de l'Odéon in Paris, sang Maurice. Other notable premieres included Adolphe Adam's three-act opéra comique Le muletier de Tolède with Marie Cabel in the leading soprano role of Elvire (14 December 1854; 54 performances); Adam's one-act opéra comique À Clichy (24 December 1854; 89 performances); and a one-act opéra comique by Ferdinand Poise called Les charmeurs (7 March 1855; 66 performances). The last had a libretto by Adolphe de Leuven based on Charles Simon Favart's Les ensorcelés, ou Jeannot et Jeannette.

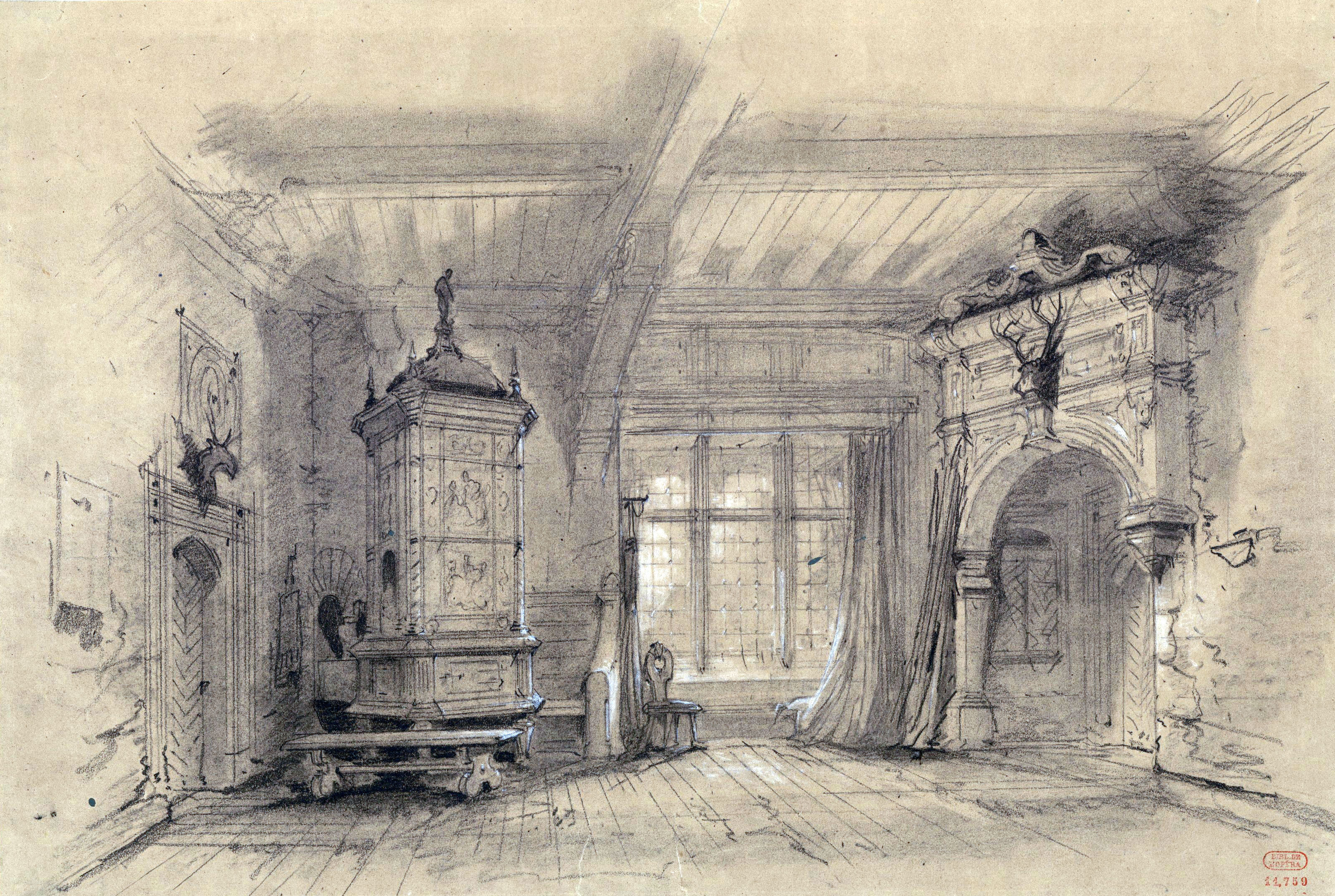
Act 2 of Robin des bois, a room in the gamekeeper's house, as performed at the Théâtre Lyrique in 1855

After beginning the season with a series of six less-than-successful premieres, Perrin revived a much-needed money-maker, the three-act Robin des bois (Robin Hood). This was a highly altered version of Weber's Der Freischütz, that had been translated and adapted in 1824 by Thomas Sauvage and Castil-Blaze, for performance at the Théâtre de l'Odéon. Eugène Scribe had also been brought in to make some revisions early in the run, but he preferred to keep his contribution anonymous.

This version had also been performed with success at the Opéra-Comique in 1835 and in several provincial theatres. The alterations to Weber's opera were both textual and musical and involved a change in setting from Bohemia during the Thirty Years War to ostensibly Yorkshire during the reign of Charles I, although Sir Walter Scott's novels may also have been an influence, since Scotland is also mentioned. The famous Wolf's Glen scene was located at the crossroads of Saint Dunstan. Among the alterations to the music was the addition of a duet ("Hin nimm die Seele mein!") from Weber's Euryanthe, although Perrin appears to have omitted this. Weber had objected to the many changes, but Castil-Blaze replied that Weber was being ungrateful, as the alterations would guarantee the opera's success in France. Adding "financial insult to artistic injury", the adaptors, not the composer, were the ones to receive the performance fees.

Perrin's revival of Robin des bois opened on 24 January 1855 and was performed 59 times that season and a total of 128 times by the company up to 1863, when it was replaced with a more faithful translation of the original called Le Freischütz. The singers included Pauline Deligne-Lauters in the role of Annette (Agathe in the original), Caroline Girard as Nancy (Ännchen), Rousseau de Lagrave as Tony (Max), and Marcel Junca as Robin (Samiel). Hector Berlioz in the Journal des débats thought the sets and the men's chorus were good, but the woodwinds in the orchestra made so many egregious errors that the audience began murmuring. Paul Scudo in the Revue des deux mondes agreed, saying that the orchestra was "at its wits ends", while adding that the singers were all subpar except for Deligne-Lauters.

The Musical World (24 February 1855) reported that Madame Lauters had been coached by Gilbert Duprez:

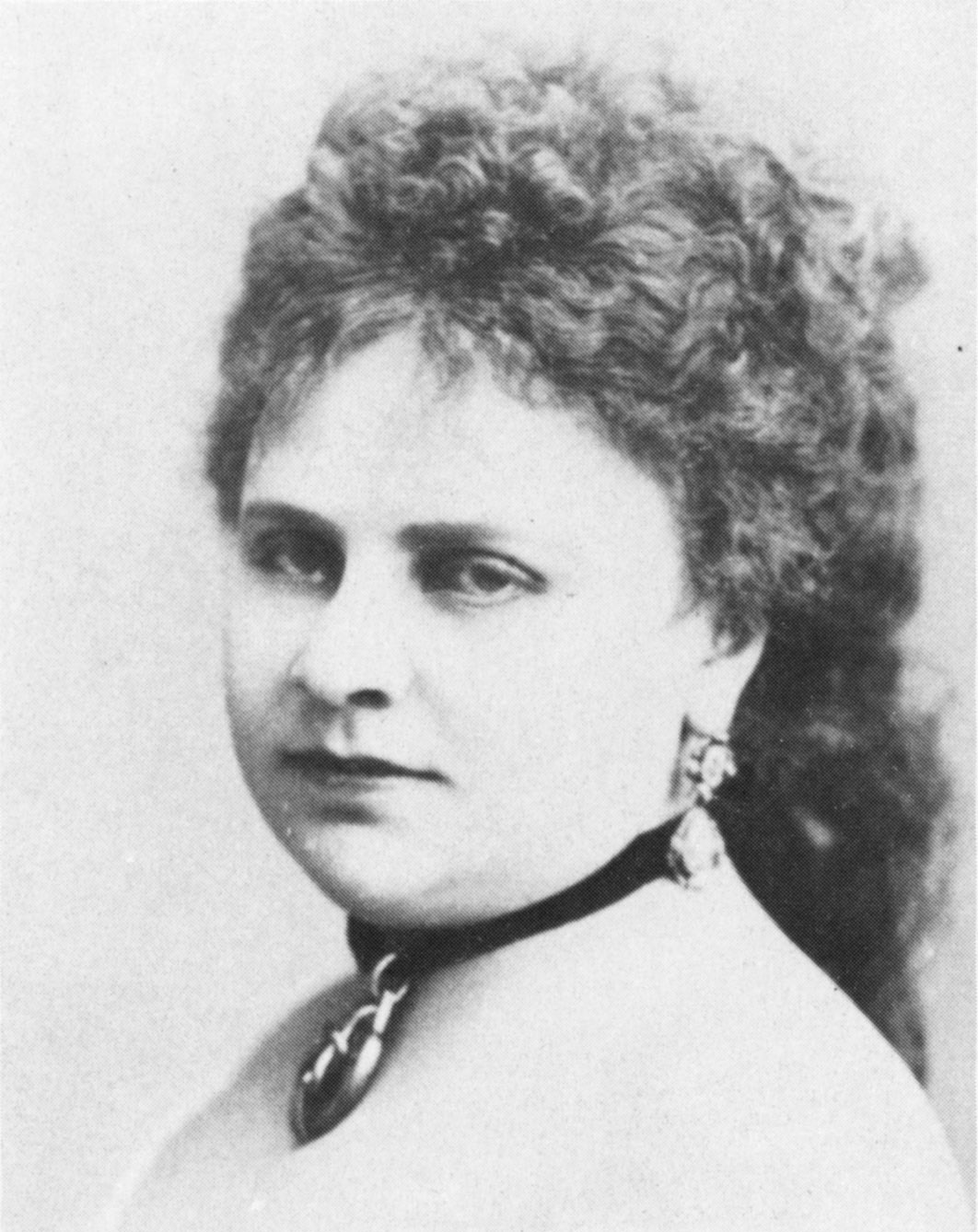
Pauline Lauters

Never could singer be under more unfit master for an opera like Der Freischütz. M. Duprez seems to have considered this masterpiece from the Castil-Blaze point of view; and as the "maestro" had taken liberties with this great composer's text, the "professore" thought he might, with equal good grace, embellish and vary the melodies. He set himself to work, and spared not roulades, shakes, and ricercate, whereof Weber had no idea, and which, had he heard them, would have driven him mad. Madame Lauters thought she could not go wrong in following the advice of so great a master of the art vocal as M. Duprez, and accordingly she repeated, note for note, what he had taught her. The public delighted at a tour de force, quand même, applauded 'to the echo;' and it was only on reading the feuilletons of the principal journalists that Madame Lauters woke from her dream of contented happiness. Like a sensible woman she profited by advice, though the cup was bitter and the dose strong. I have heard her again, and was delighted to find she had discarded M. Duprez and returned to Weber. A greater improvement, a more decided change for the better, I could hardly have imagined; nor could there be a greater treat than to hear Weber's exquisite melodies uttered by the rich and musical voice of Madame Lauters.

=== 1855–1856: Pierre Pellegrin ===
Perrin may have been somewhat disappointed with his results at the theatre. In any case, he resigned his post and Pierre Pellegrin took his place. Marie Cabel was under contract directly with Perrin, so the company's star soprano transferred before the end of the year to the Opéra-Comique where Perrin was still the manager. However, Pellegrin did manage to attract some new singers, including a Mlle Pouilley who had appeared at the Opéra, the bass Hermann-Léon from the Opéra-Comique, and most significantly the soprano Caroline Miolan-Carvalho. Miolan-Carvalho was to become the most important singer in the company. Although Pellegrin's appointment with the Théâtre Lyrique was ratified on 29 September 1855, he was having little success and shortly after signing Miolan-Carvalho, in the midst of preparations for a new premiere, Clapisson's La fanchonnette, he was forced to file a petition for bankruptcy. The artists attempted to take on the management of the company and on 18 January 1856 mounted a double-bill consisting of the premiere of Adam's one-act opéra comique Falstaff (23 performances) and a more successful revival of his three-act opéra comique Le sourd ou L'auberge pleine (133 performances), but Clapisson soon intervened and invited Madame Carvalho's husband Léon Carvalho to take Pellegrin's place. Carvalho agreed, and on 20 February 1856 he was officially appointed the new director.

=== 1856–1860: Léon Carvalho ===
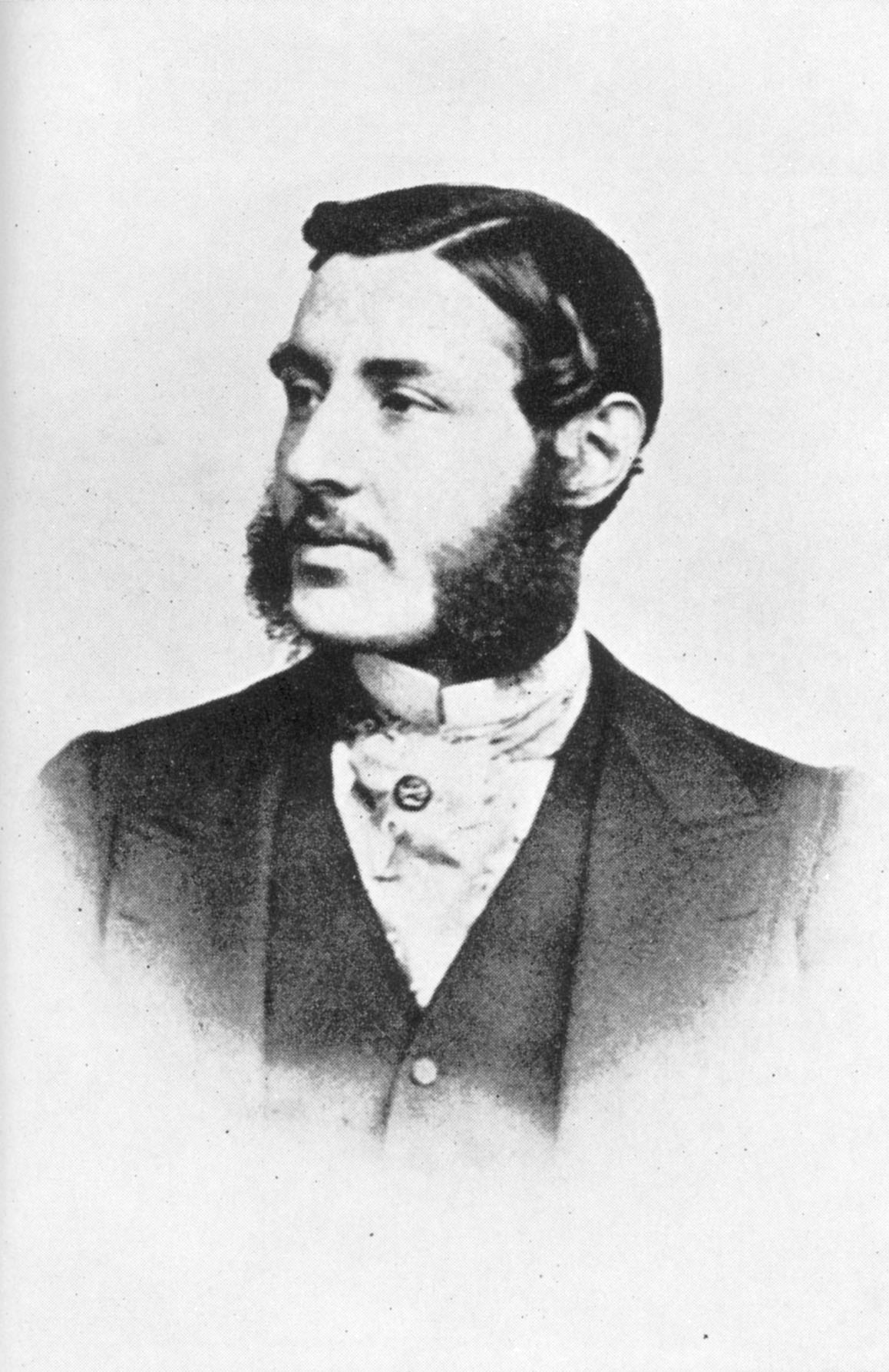
Léon Carvalho

Léon Carvalho had had little or no experience as a theatre director when he took on the position at the Théâtre Lyrique, yet he proved to be the most successful in the company's history. His counterpart at the Opéra-Comique, Nestor Roqueplan, was later to say: "I admit my weakness for this indomitable and inventive director, who has done more for the spreading of great music than all the other lyric theatres in Paris put together." Carvalho was greatly aided in his success by the presence of his wife Caroline Miolan-Carvalho, who became the leading soprano and the company's greatest box office attraction, but Léon Carvalho also engaged other important singers who were already, or would become, major stars, including Delphine Ugalde, Marie Sax, Pauline Viardot, and Christine Nilsson.

Most of Léon Carvalho's productions were to be substantial works of 3 acts or more, as opposed to the large number of one-act opéras comiques which had previously predominated. His presentations were more carefully prepared and lavishly produced, and one production (or an alternating pair) was kept on stage until it was no longer making money. If successful, fewer productions were mounted in a given year, if not, new production activity could become almost feverish. He put a greater emphasis on public domain works, significantly exceeding the 1851 rule (which had been established for the Opéra-National) of only 33% of acts in this category.

The company's success with Robin des Bois prompted Carvalho to mount three additional Weber operas, although none did as well as Robin. The first was Obéron, in a French translation by Charles Nuitter, Alexandre Beaumont, and Paul de Chazot (27 February 1857; 100 performances), followed by Euryanthe in a French translation by Adolphe de Leuven and Jules-Henri Vernoy de Saint-Georges (1 September 1857; 28 performances), and the one-act opéra comique Abou Hassan in a French translation by Charles Nuitter and Louis-Alexandre Beaumont (11 May 1859; 21 performances).

Other successful revivals under Carvalho's leadership at the Théâtre Historique included André Grétry's three-act opéra comique Richard Coeur-de-lion (23 May 1856; 302 performances); Les noces de Figaro, a French translation by Jules Barbier and Michel Carré of Mozart's four-act comic opera Le nozze di Figaro (8 May 1858; 200 performances); L'enlèvement au sérail, a French translation by Prosper Pascal of Mozart's two-act opéra comique Die Entführung aus dem Serail (11 May 1859; 87 performances); and Gluck's Orphée (18 November 1859; 138 performances). The last had been translated from the original Italian by Pierre-Louis Moline when Gluck had adapted his Vienna version in 1774 for the Paris Opera, replacing the alto castrato role of Orfeo with the high tenor (haute-contre) role of Orphée. The Théâtre Lyrique's production was a landmark revival in the history of the opera, with the music adapted by Hector Berlioz for the mezzo-soprano Pauline Viardot as Orphée. Eurydice was sung by Marie Sax, who later became a leading soprano at the Paris Opera.

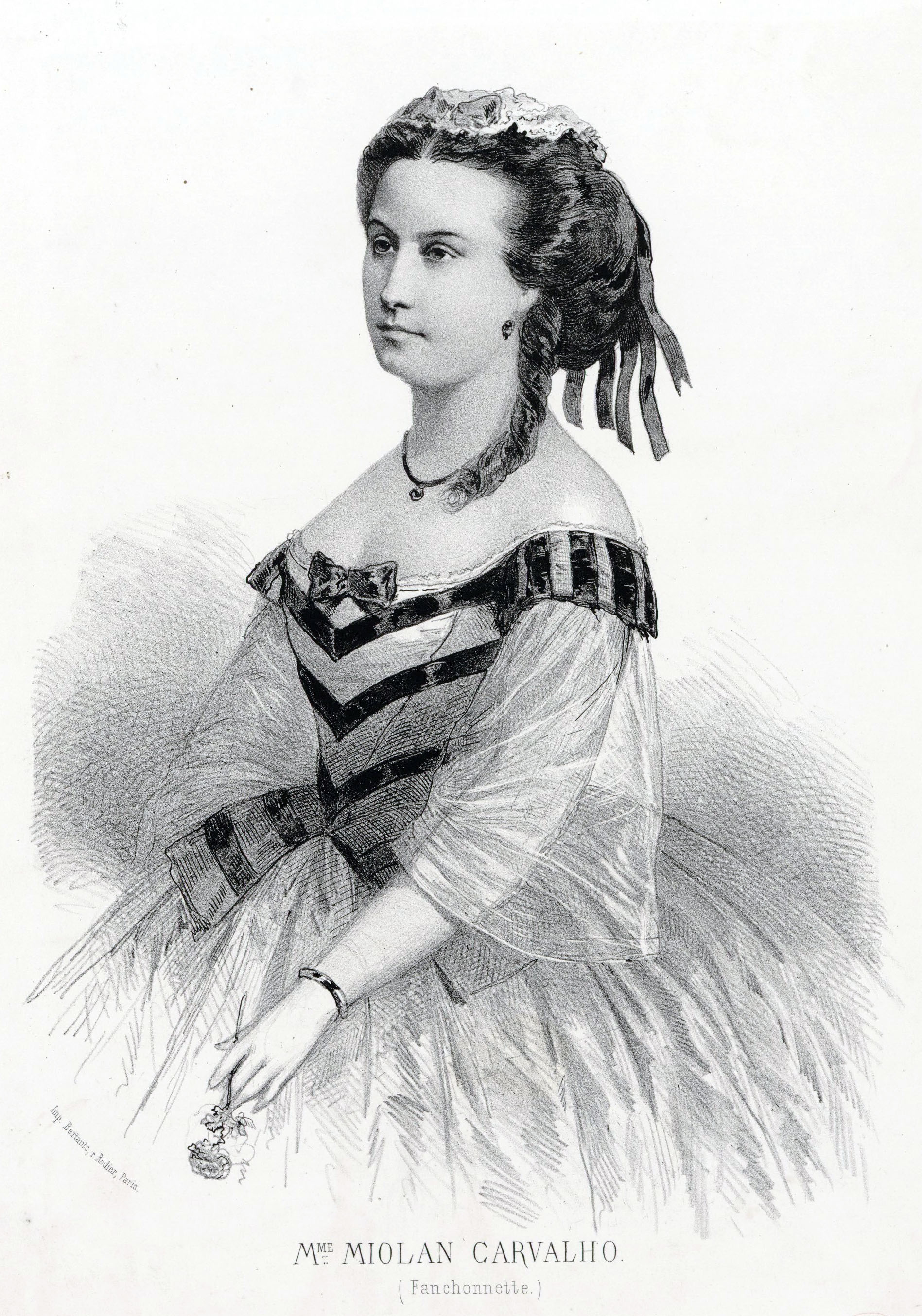
Caroline Carvalho as Fanchonnette

This period was also distinguished by many successful productions of new French works, including Louis Clapisson's three-act opéra comique La fanchonnette (1 March 1856; 192 performances), Aimé Maillart's three-act opéra comique Les dragons de Villars (19 September 1856; 156 performances), Victor Massé's three-act opéra comique La reine topaze (19 September 1856; 170 performances), Léo Delibes' one-act opéra comique Maître Griffard (3 October 1857; 64 performances), and Charles Gounod's three-act opéra comique Le médecin malgré lui (15 January 1858; 142 performances). The most significant premiere under Carvalho, however, was Gounod's opera Faust (19 March 1859; 306 performances) in which Carvalho's wife Caroline Miolan-Carvalho sang the role of Marguerite. She later became internationally famous in the part.

Beginning on 18 February 1860 Gounod's Philémon et Baucis premiered at the theatre. Despite a strong cast, with Caroline Carvalho as Baucis, Marie Sax as the Bacchante, and Charles-Amable Battaille as Jupiter, this production was less successful: "it merely fizzled out after 13 indifferent performances." It was, however, revived more successfully in a two-act version at the Opéra-Comique in 1876. The revised version was kept in that company's repertory up to 1943.

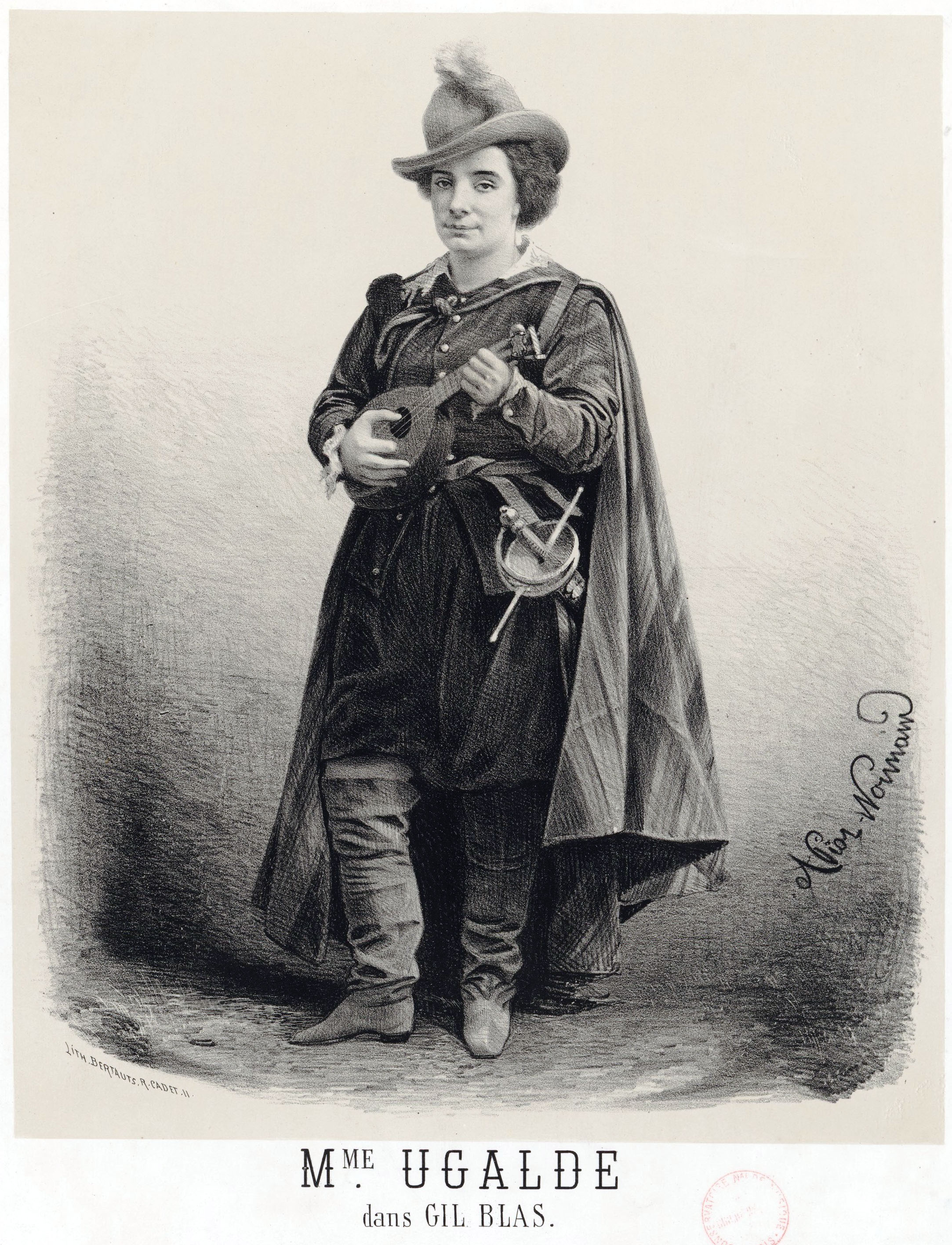
Delphine Ugalde as Gil Blas

Gounod's opera was followed on 24 March by the premiere of Théophile Semet's five-act opéra comique Gil Blas with a libretto by Jules Barbier and Michel Carré based on Alain-René Lesage's novel Gil Blas de Santillane. Delphine Ugalde starred in the title role and her presence probably accounted for its relatively long run of 61 performances. The Musical World (14 April 1860) wrote that Ugalde "fills the role of the hero to the great delight of the public, for whatever charm may now and then be found wanting in her voice she supplies by her animated acting [...] nothing is equal to the song she sings before the door of the inn where the villagers are feasting, accompanying herself with a mandoline. He [Gil Blas] is expressing the hunger he feels, and when they will not listen to him he changes his tone to diabolical menaces. The air was rapturously encored." Albert Lasalle tells us that "the 'Serenade of Gil Blas' was used on all the Barbary barrel organs [of Paris] for the next two or three years."

Probably at least partly because of the failure of Philémon et Baucis and partly because of his many extravagant productions, Carvalho had run into significant financial difficulty. As one critic wrote: "Faust was a magnificent production, but M. Carvalho had spent 150,000 francs on it, that is to say 120,000 francs too much." He resigned as director of the company on 1 April. Charles Réty, who had joined the company in March 1856 as secretary-general, took his place, and the quality of performances at the theatre began to decline.

=== 1860–1862: Charles Réty ===
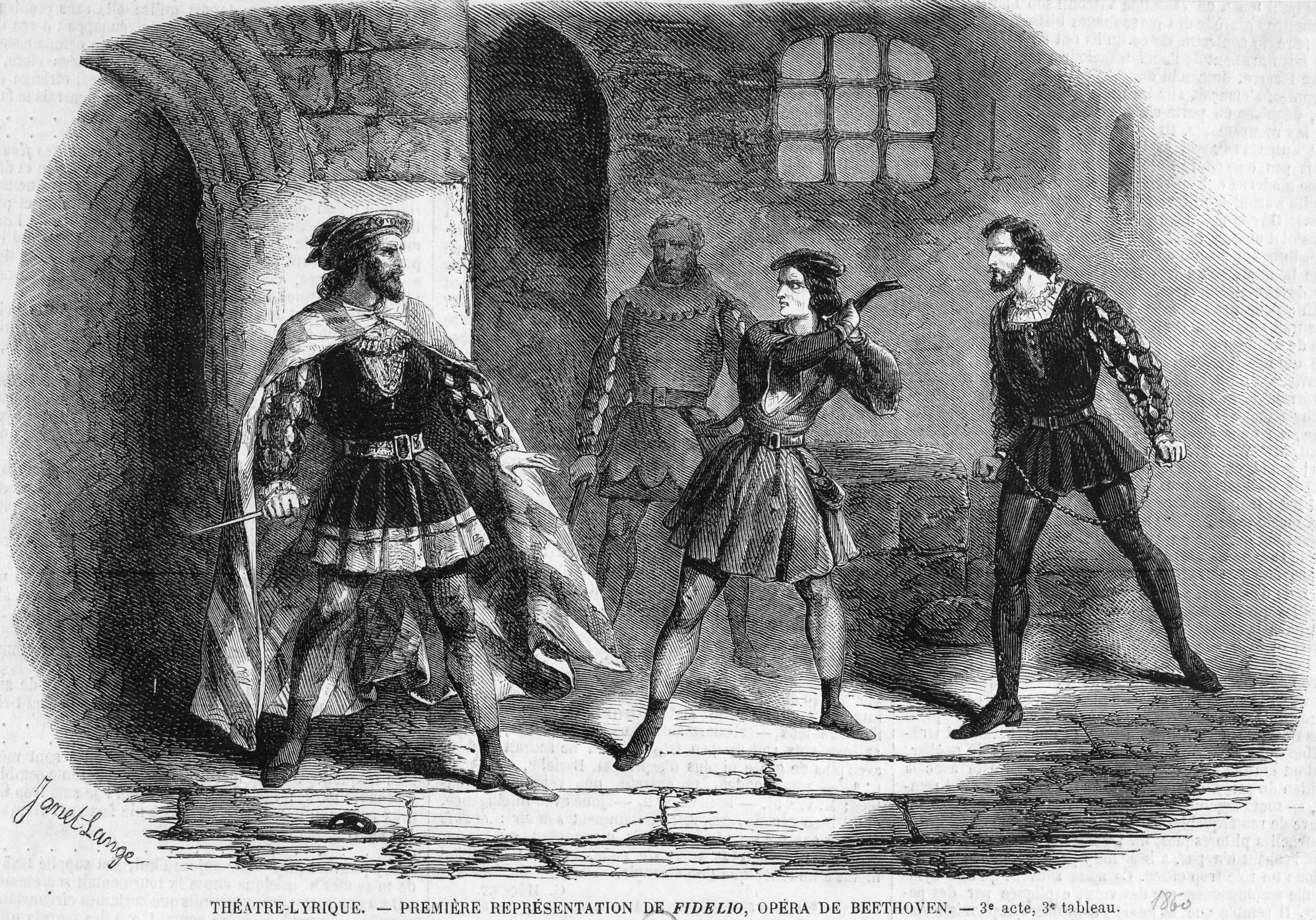
The last act of Fidelio at the Théâtre Lyrique

When Charles Réty (1826–1895) took over from Léon Carvalho in April 1860, a new revival was already in rehearsal. This was Beethoven's Fidelio in a French translation by Jules Barbier and Michel Carré with the location of the story changed to Milan in the 15th century. Pauline Viardot was Isabelle, Duchesse d'Aragon (Leonore in the original version), Guardi (né Hector Gruyer) sang the role of Jean Galéas (Florestan), and Charles-Amable Battaille was Rocco. The role of Don Fernando became Charles VIII of France. The production was first presented on 5 May, and unfortunately Viardot did not repeat the success she had with Orphée. The part was too high for her, and inexplicably the spoken dialogue gave her difficulty, making the audience uncomfortable. Guardi was not much better. It closed after only eleven performances with the claim that Viardot and Battaille had other engagements, but poor ticket sales were undoubtedly the deciding factor. Réty finished the season by introducing some insubstantial new works and giving further performances of Orphée.

For the 1860–1861 season Réty's most successful new production was a revival of Halévy's three-act opéra comique Le val d'Andorre (15 October 1860; 135 performances) with Marie-Stéphanie Meillet as Rose-de Mai and Jules Monjauze as Stéphan. The most successful new work was Ernest Reyer's three-act opéra comique La statue (11 April 1861; 59 performances) with Blanche Baretti as Margyane, Jules Monjauze as Sélim, and Émile Wartel as Kaloum. The following season Marie Cabel returned to the Théâtre Lyrique from the Opéra-Comique and was the star of the even more successful La chatte merveilleuse, a three-act opéra comique by Albert Grisar (18 March 1862; 72 performances) with Cabel as Féline, Caroline Vadé as the Princess, Jules Monjauze as Urbain, and Émile Wartel as the Ogre of the Forest. The libretto by Dumanoir and d'Ennery was based on Charles Perrault's Chat botté (Puss in Boots) and a vaudeville by Eugène Scribe called La chatte metamorphosée en femme. In spite of its initial success the work was never revived.

During Réty's directorship receipts at the theatre had consistently fallen, so that by 4 October 1862 he finally gave up and resigned with debts of 773,000 francs. Later in his career (1870–1895) he would become the music critic of Le Figaro, writing under the pseudonym of Charles Darcours.

== On the Place du Châtelet ==
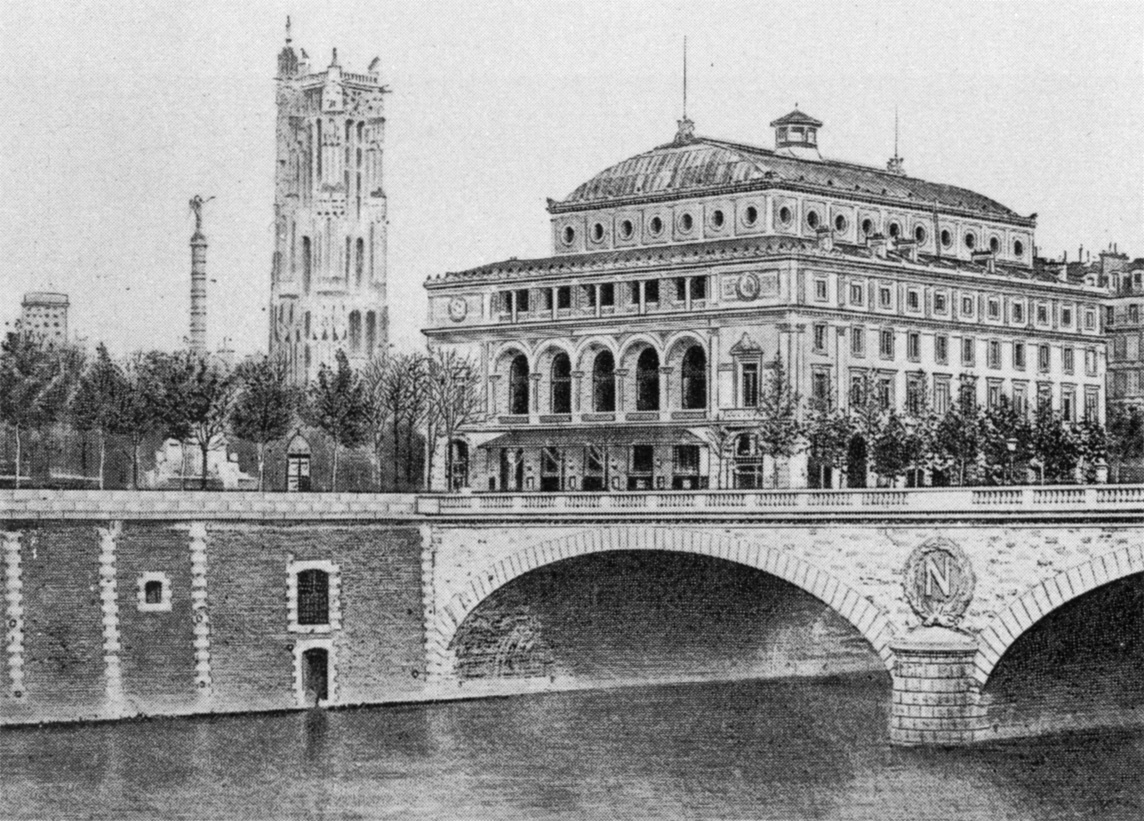
The Théâtre Lyrique Impérial on the Place du Châtelet

In 1862, as a result of the destruction of the theatres on the boulevard du Temple during Haussmann's renovation of Paris, the company relocated to a new theatre (capacity 1800) on the east side of the Place du Châtelet. The architect was Gabriel Davioud, and he also designed a larger, but similarly styled theatre, the Cirque Impérial, on the west side of the square. The two theatres, which face each other, are still to be found in the same locations, but with different names: the Cirque Impérial soon became the Théâtre du Châtelet, and that of the Théâtre Lyrique is today known as the Théâtre de la Ville. Not long before opening at the new theatre in October, the company was officially renamed Théâtre Lyrique Impérial, but reverted to its previous name after the fall of Napoleon III in 1870. The company continued performing in the theatre, sometimes referred to as the Salle du Théâtre-Lyrique, until 25 May 1871, when it was destroyed by a fire caused by the fighting during the Paris Commune. The theatre was eventually rebuilt on the same site in the same style and reopened in 1874 as the Théâtre des Nations and later became the Théâtre Sarah Bernhardt, but was never again used by the Théâtre Lyrique.

=== 1862–1868: Léon Carvalho ===
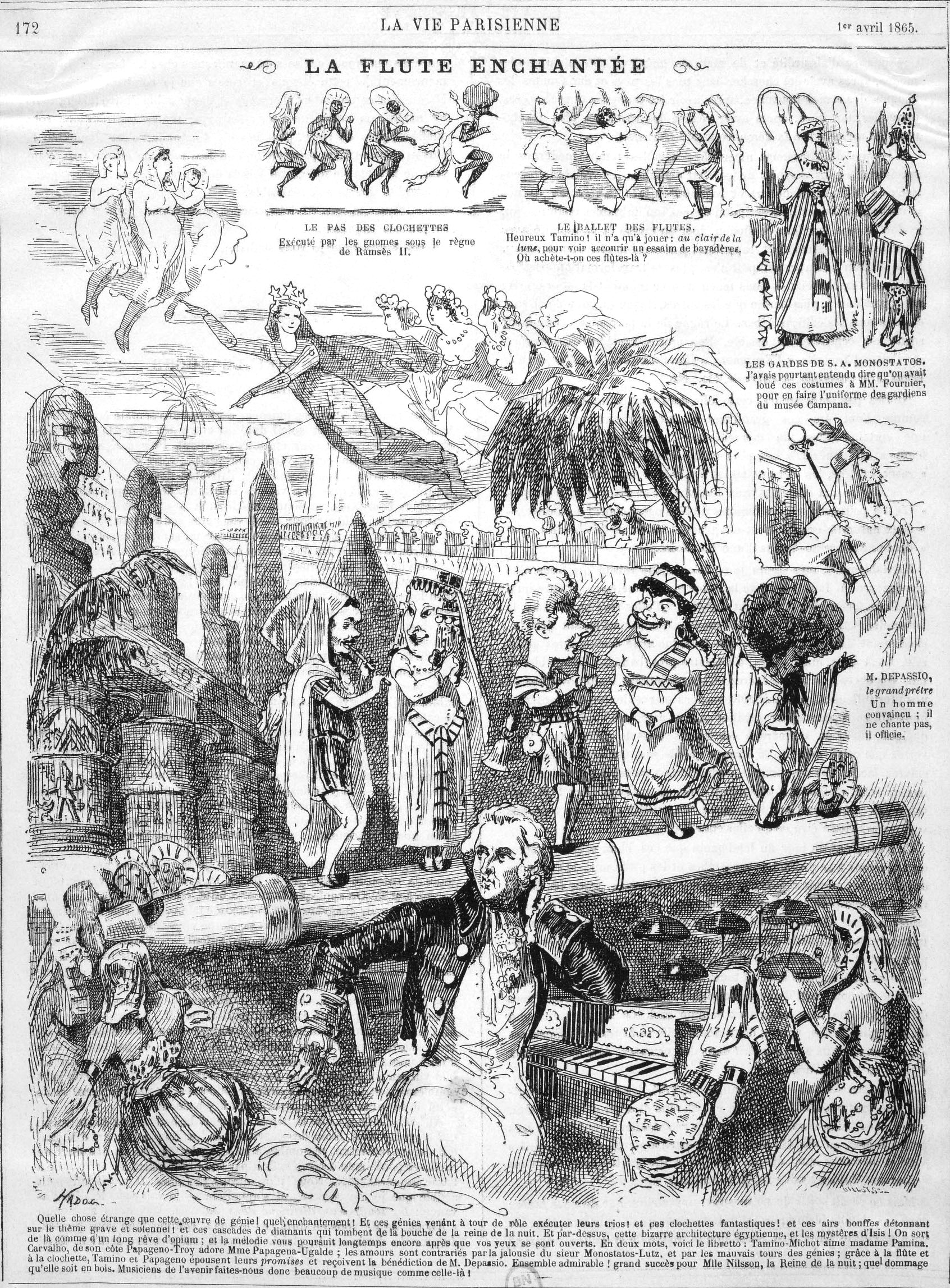
Press illustrations for La flûte enchantée (1865)

Léon Carvalho was reappointed director of the company on 7 October 1862. As before Carvalho kept the company solvent by reviving established operas, including both French and foreign works translated into French. Revivals at the theatre on the Place du Châtelet included a new, more faithful translation of Weber's Der Freischütz (now called Le Freischütz), first performed on 8 December 1862; the four-act Peines d'amour perdues, a highly adapted version of Mozart's Così fan tutte that starred Constance-Caroline Faure-Lefebvre and Marie Cabel and was first performed on 31 March 1863, but only received 18 performances; Grétry's two-act L'épreuve villageoise (11 September 1863; 48 performances); Verdi's Rigoletto (24 December 1863; 243 performances); Bellini's Norma (14 June 1864; 8 performances); Donizetti's Don Pasquale (9 September 1864; 35 performances); Verdi's La traviata, performed under the title Violetta with Christine Nilsson in the title role (27 October 1864; 102 performances); Mozart's The Magic Flute, performed as La flûte enchantée with Christine Nilsson as the Queen of the Night and Delphine Ugalde as Papagena (23 February 1865; 172 performances); Verdi's Macbeth (21 April 1865; 14 performances); Flotow's Martha with Christine Nilsson as Lady Henriette (18 December 1865; 163 performances); and Mozart's Don Giovanni, performed as Don Juan, with Anne Charton-Demeur as Donna Anna, Christine Nilsson as Donna Elvire, and Caroline Miolan-Carvalho as Zerline (8 May 1866; 71 performances).

The most successful premiere during this period was Gounod's Roméo et Juliette (27 April 1867; 90 performances). Of historical interest, if less successful, were Georges Bizet's Les pêcheurs de perles (30 September 1863; 18 performances); Hector Berlioz's Les Troyens à Carthage (4 November 1863; 21 performances); Charles Gounod's Mireille (19 March 1864; 41 performances); and La jolie fille de Perth (26 December 1867; 18 performances). There were also two new one-act opéras comiques which premiered together on 8 December 1864: Albert Grisar's Les bégaiements d'amour (The Stammerers of Love; 36 performances) and Henri Caspers' Le cousin Babylas (59 performances).

In 1868 Carvalho launched a new venture, an extension of the Théâtre Lyrique at the Salle Ventadour. To avoid confusion with the Théâtre-Italien, which was the resident company at that theatre, Carvalho's new enterprise was to be called the Théâtre de la Renaissance. The Théâtre Lyrique's more lavish productions, such as Gounod's Faust and Roméo et Juliette and Weber's Le Freischütz, were to be presented at the more distinguished Ventadour, while the company's simpler productions and operas by young composers were to be presented at the theatre on the Place du Châtelet. Performances at the new venue began on 16 March with Faust, but by 7 May 1868 Carvalho was bankrupt, the new venture ceased to operate, and he was eventually forced to resign as director of the Théâtre Lyrique.

=== 1868–1870: Jules Pasdeloup ===
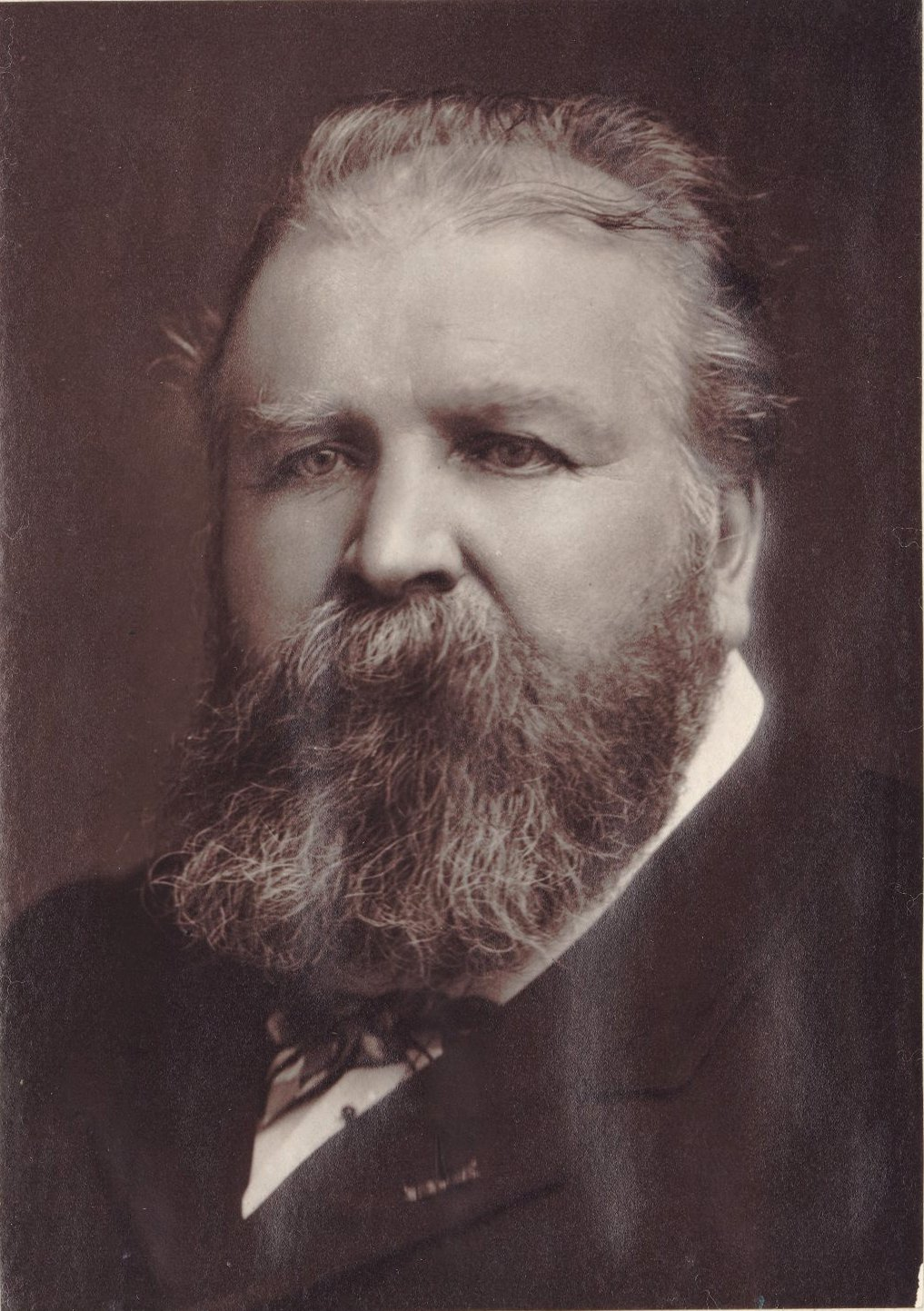
Jules Pasdeloup

By 22 August 1868 Jules Pasdeloup had been selected and confirmed as the new director of the Théâtre Lyrique. Pasdeloup, a successful conductor of popular concerts at the Cirque Napoléon with little experience as a theatre director, began with some already established productions. The season opened on 24 October with the company's revival of Halévy's Le val d'Andorre, which was followed by performances of Flotow's Martha, Rossini's Le barbier de Seville, Paer's two-act opéra comique Le maître de chapelle, and Grisar's one-act opéra comique Les bégaiements d'amour.

Pasdeloup's first new production was a revival of Méhul's one-act opéra comique L'irato (1801), which opened on 16 November 1868. It was such an abysmal failure that it received only one performance. Next was a new revival of Gluck's Iphigénie en Tauride, which was first presented on 26 November and did somewhat better with 15 performances. Ernest Reyer reported that at the second performance of Iphigénie on 29 November Pasdeloup arrived at the theatre after having "directed in the morning the beautiful Mass of Mme la Vicomte de Grandval at the Panthéon, and, in the afternoon the concert at the Cirque [Napoléon]." Pasdeloup had also retained his post as conductor of the Orphéonistes and seems to have had too little time available for running the Théâtre Lyrique. His next new revival was Adolphe Adam's three-act opéra comique Le brasseur de Preston on 23 December. The latter proved to be more popular, receiving 60 performances. Not long after the opening of Le brasseur, Adolphe Deloffre, who up to this time had been the chief conductor of the Théâtre Lyrique, left to become the conductor of the Opéra-Comique.

The new year brought further performances of the company's productions of Verdi's Rigoletto (beginning 8 January 1869), Mozart's Don Juan (beginning on 24 January), and Verdi's Violetta (beginning on 1 February). Christine Nilsson, who had been highly successful as Violetta, had left the company for the Opéra and was replaced by the Hungarian soprano Aglaja Orgeni. She had been recommended by Pauline Viardot on the advice of Clara Schumann and had a strong foreign accent. She may have been mistaken as German and was poorly received. Gustave Bertrand, writing in the 7 February issue of Le Ménestrel, complained that the audience was "as unjust as they were brutal" and found that "Mlle Orgeni is an artist of merit." None of these productions were filling the house, despite significantly lower ticket prices. Henri Moreno of Le Ménestrel (31 January 1869) wrote of Don Juan: "He [Pasdeloup] does not want stars, but one cannot perform the classics, above all, unless with artists of the first order." The Revue et Gazette Musicale (31 January 1869) agreed: "Unfortunately he does not work on the same principles as M Carvalho, the production is therefore diminished as, consequently, is the success, in spite of all the care given elsewhere to the orchestral part."

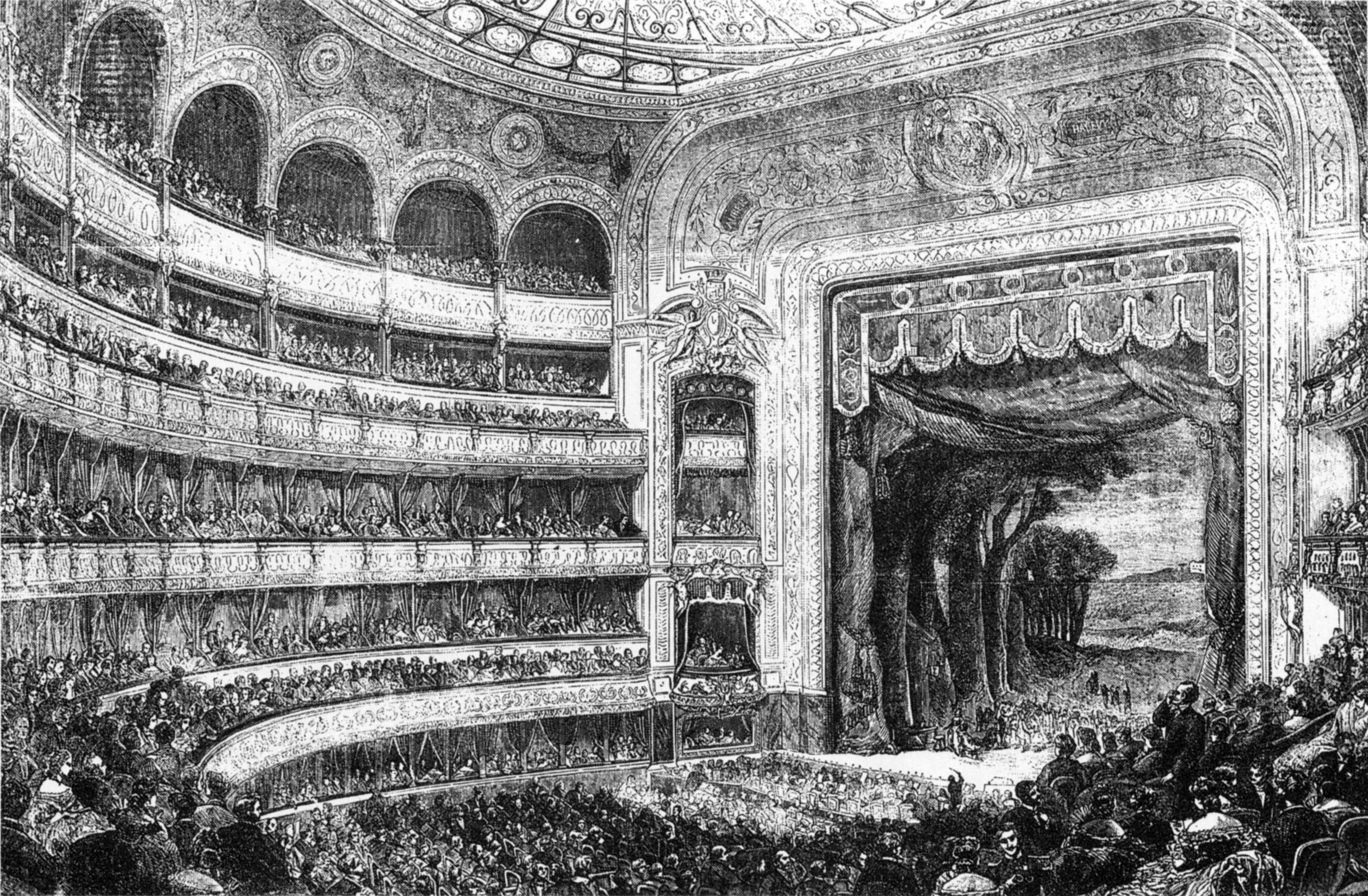
The Théâtre Lyrique during the premiere of Ernest Boulanger's Don Quichotte

These revivals were followed by some premieres: a one-act opéra comique by Ernest Guiraud called En prison, which was first presented on 5 March 1869 and received 21 performances, and another new work, the three-act opéra comique Don Quichotte by Ernest Boulanger (winner of the Prix de Rome in 1835 and father of Nadia Boulanger), which premiered on 10 May and received only 18 performances. The latter, having been adapted from Cervantes' novel by Jules Barbier and Michel Carré and declined by Offenbach, "was received benevolently but without favor. The piece was lacking in interest or movement; it presented nothing but a series of scenes badly stitched one to the other, and which passed before the eyes of the spectator like magic lantern slides." Jules Ruelle, writing in Le Guide Musical, thought the baritone Auguste-Alphonse Meillet excellent in the role of Sancho-Pança, but the young bass Alfred Giraudet, although having the proper physique, not quite up to the role of the Don vocally – his voice began to fail by the end of the second act. Ruelle also felt that the lack of important female roles and a tenor produced a certain monotony in the timbres of the musical numbers.

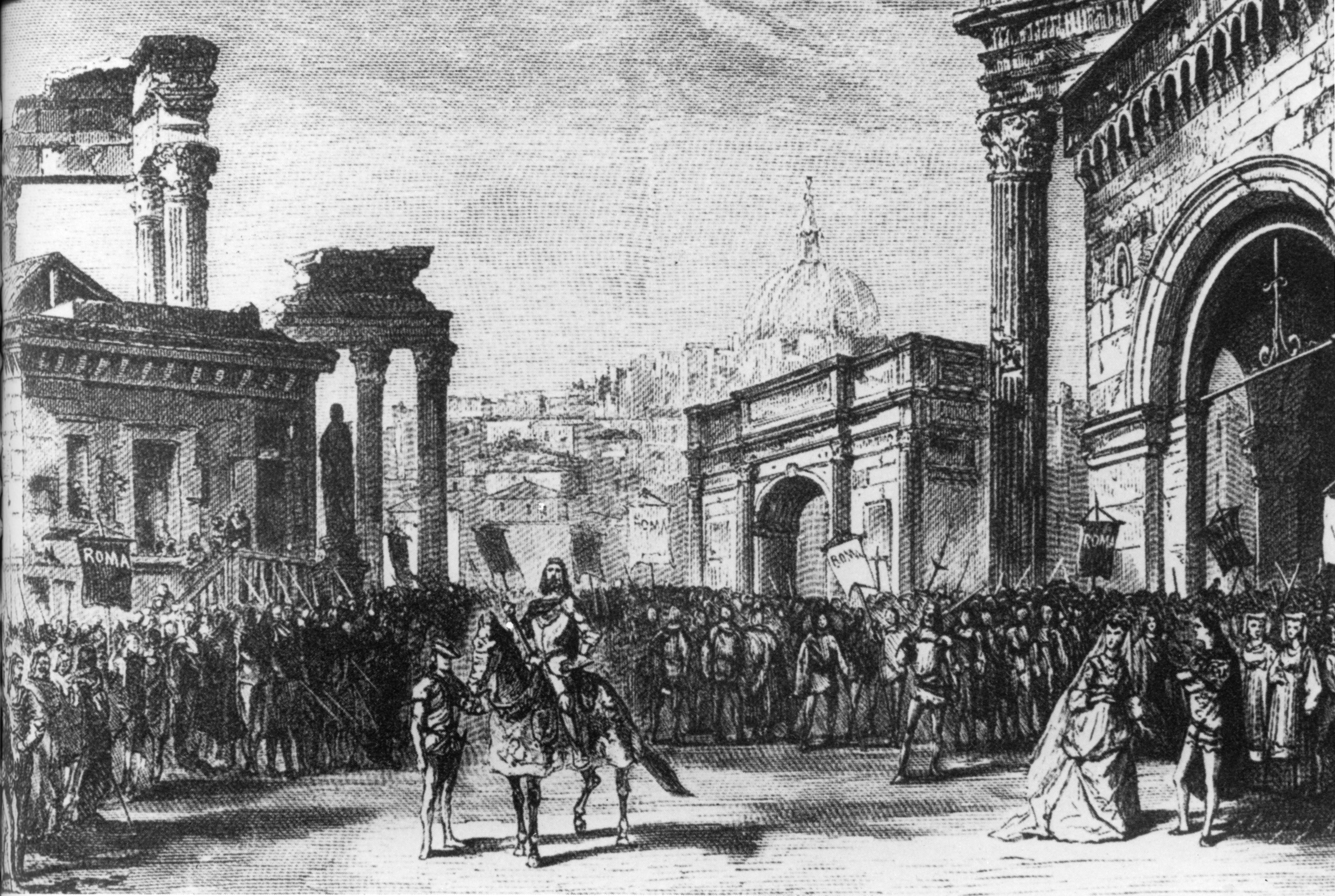
Act 3 of Rienzi (1869)

The most important new production, however, was the French premiere of Wagner's Rienzi on 6 April 1869. Pasdeloup was a well known advocate of Wagner's music and had performed it often at his popular concerts at the Cirque Napoléon, even though it was sometimes greeted with hostility by both his orchestra and many in his audiences. He had travelled to Lucerne to consult with Wagner about Rienzi, and Wagner agreed to many of Pasdeloup's suggested alterations for adapting the work to a French audience. The libretto was translated by Charles Nuitter and Jules Guillaume, and the rehearsals, which at Wagner's suggestion were superintended by Carl Eckert, were extensive. The lavish production was stage managed by Augustin Vizentini (father of Albert Vizentini, a former violinist with the Théâtre Lyrique). The sets were designed by Charles-Antoine Cambon and Auguste Alfred Rubé, and the costumes were plentiful and rich. The chorus was enlarged to 120 voices, and many of the principal artists of the company had agreed to sing in it for this production. At certain points in the opera as many as 200 extras were on stage at once. The cast included Jules Monjauze as Rienzi, Anna Sternberg as Irène, Juliette Borghèse as Adriano, and Marguerite Priola (in her operatic debut) as Le Messager.

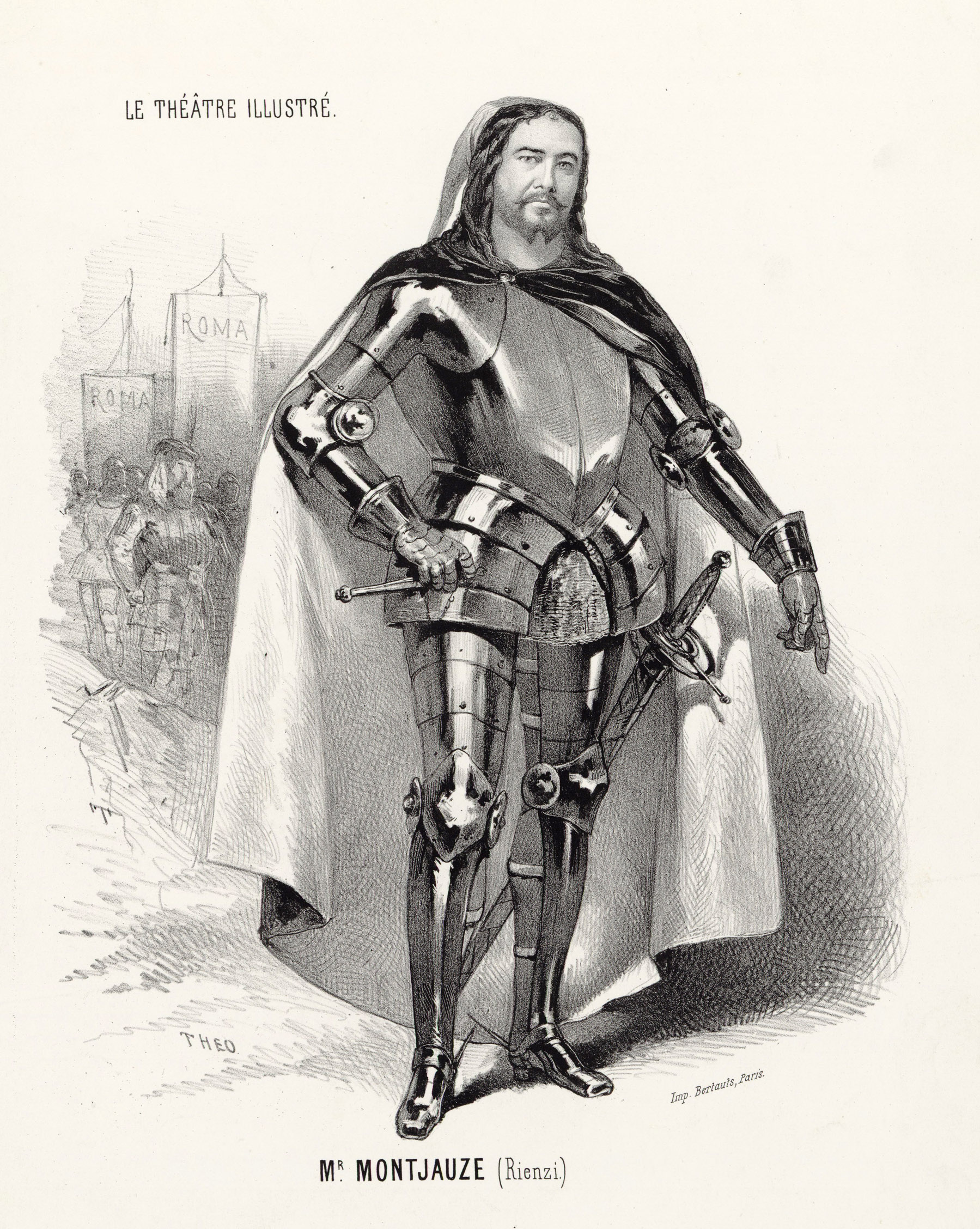
Jules Monjauze as Rienzi (1869)

The composer Georges Bizet, who attended a general rehearsal, wrote a description in a letter to Edmond Galabert (April 1869):

They began at eight o'clock.—They finished at two.—Eighty instrumentalists in the orchestra, thirty on the stage, a hundred thirty choristers, a hundred fifty walk-ons.—Work badly constructed. A single role: that of Rienzi, remarkably played by Monjauze. An uproar, of which nothing can give an idea; a mixture of Italian themes; peculiar and bad style; music of decline rather than of the future. Some numbers detestable! some admirable! on the whole; an astonishing work, prodigiously alive: a breathtaking, Olympian grandeur! inspiration, without measure, without order, but of genius! will it be a success? I do not know!—The house was full, no claque! Some prodigious effects! some disastrous effects! some cries of enthusiasm! then doleful silence for half-an-hour."

The ticket prices for Rienzi had been raised to offset the extra costs, but the reviews, which were extensive, were mostly critical. By 13 May the prices had to be lowered, and the work had been cut so much that it was reduced to little more than unending dialogue between Rienzi and the people of Rome. Nevertheless, Pasdeloup was persistent, and the production was to receive a total of 38 performances.

The season ended on 31 May with a performance of Rienzi. Gustave Bertrand, writing in Le Ménestrel (11 July 1869), commented: "M. Wagner confirmed in a letter that M. Pasdeloup had only taken the direction of the Théâtre Lyrique to perform his six operas. We hope that M. Pasdeloup will repudiate this bragging. If the Théâtre Lyrique is subventioned it is primarily to assist the French school and M. Pasdeloup must never forget that. One Wagner opera will suffice for our enlightenment." Even so, the new season began with a performance of Rienzi on 1 September. Pasdeloup did provide some French music: on 12 September there was a concert which included Félicien David's symphonic ode Le désert, but also Acts I and II of Rossini's Le barbier de Seville. The concert was repeated. Later another concert included David's symphonic ode Christophe Colombe, but this concert also included foreign works: the overture to Rossini's Semiramide, and an aria from Le Freischütz sung by Marie Schroeder. This program was repeated twice.

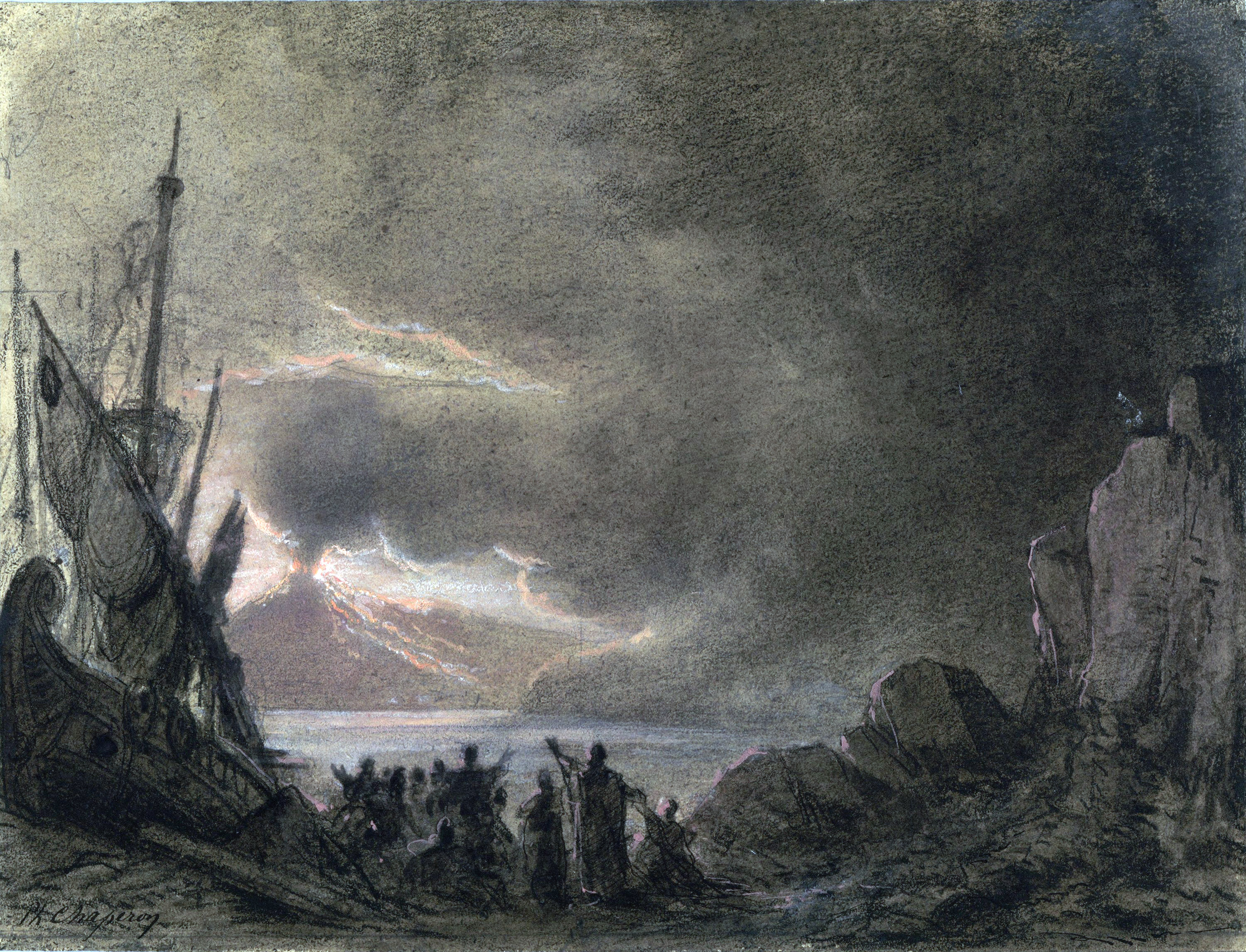
Design sketch by Philippe Chaperon for Act IV, tableau 2, of Le dernier jour de Pompéï (1869)

Still, the first new work of the season was a French opera, Victorin de Joncières' four-act Le dernier jour de Pompéï, which premiered on 21 September 1869. Marie Schroeder sang the lead soprano role of Ione. It did not go unnoticed that the libretto, by Charles Nuitter and Louis-Alexandre Beaumont, was, like Rienzi, based on a novel by Edward Bulwer-Lytton (The Last Days of Pompeii). It was also duly noted that Wagner had strongly influenced Joncières' music. (Joncières was a Wagner enthusiast and travelled to Munich to see one of the first performances of Das Rheingold.) However, other influences were also heard, including Meyerbeer, Verdi, and Donizetti. It had been advertised that the settings would be designed by Enrico Robecchi, Charles-Antoine Cambon, Auguste Alfred Rubé and Philippe Chaperon, but by the time of the premiere it was evident that much of the scenery and costumes had been reused from previous productions. The eruption of Mount Vesuvius in the final tableau triggered laughter. Galignani's Messenger (30 September 1869) wrote: "The two or three squibs spit forth by the convulsed volcano are conducive to mirth alone. ... We can assure M. Pasdeloup that no country theatre in Italy would have ventured to put off the public with such a wretched apology for an eruption." This opera was only performed 13 times.

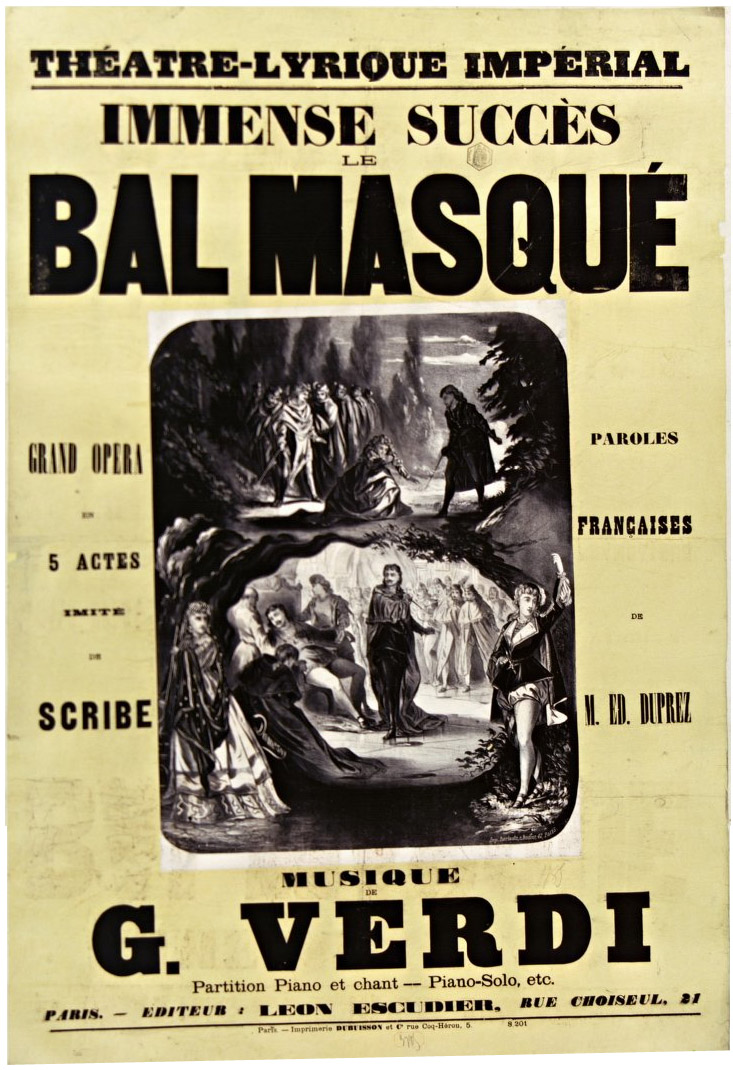
Cover of the vocal score of Le bal masqué (1869)

In an attempt to recover from so many poorly received productions, Pasdeloup's next new production was a revival of another Verdi opera, this time Un ballo in maschera as Le bal masqué in a French translation by the reliable Edouard Duprez. Marie-Stéphanie Meillet was reengaged for the important role of Amelia. Juliette Borghèse sang Ulrique, and Richard (Riccardo) was sung by a tenor by the name of Massy. The production opened on 17 November 1869 to ecstatic reviews and was performed a total of 65 times, notwithstanding that the opera was also being performed that same season in Italian at the Théâtre-Italien.

Le bal masqué was followed by Michael William Balfe's three-act The Bohemian Girl, in a revised and highly adapted French version by Jules-Henri Vernoy de Saint-Georges. It was performed under the title La Bohémienne and had originally been prepared in 1862 in the absence of Balfe for a production at the Théâtre des Arts of Rouen. The locale was changed from Edinburgh to Hungary, and the opera had been expanded to four acts with additional music, including recitatives in place of spoken dialogue and new music for La Reine Mab (The Queen of the Gypsies). In Rouen this had become the principal role, overshadowing Sarah (Arline), probably because La Reine Mab was performed by Célestine Galli-Marié (a singer who would later create the title role in Bizet's Carmen). The recitatives and additional arias in the 1862 version were composed by the now largely forgotten Jules Duprato and have probably been lost. First performed on 23 April 1862, it was given 13 times, an unusually large number for a provincial production. De Saint-Georges, who had helped to stage the opera in Rouen, also worked on the Paris version, which was modified further to restore the role of Sarah and now consisted of a prologue and four acts. The recitatives and new music for the 1869 version were probably composed by Balfe himself, who arrived in Paris in March and was present during the preparation period, even though he appears to have been seriously ill with bronchitis and bedridden during most of that time.

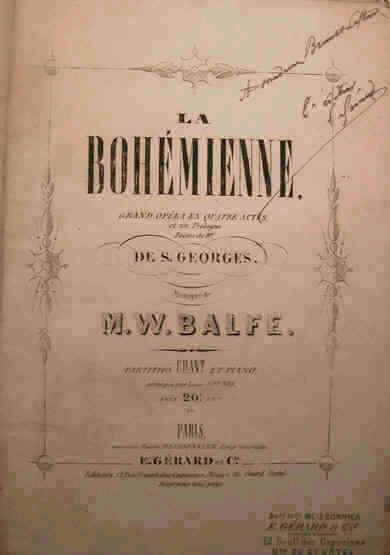
Score cover for La bohémienne (1869)

The Théâtre Lyrique's production was first performed on 30 December 1869, and the cast included Palmyre Wertheimber as La Reine Mab, Hélène Brunet-Lafleur as Sarah, and Jules Monjauze as Stenio de Stoltberg. Balfe wrote in his diary that it was "a great and genuine success". Paul de Saint-Victor, writing in Les Modes Parisiennes, remarked that it had captivated the Parisian public and would rejuvenate Balfe's reputation in France. He found the orchestration "light and brilliant", the music "clear and alive". According to the correspondent of the Neue Berliner Musikzeitung, La Bohémienne, when compared to Balfe's earlier operas which had been presented in Paris, was by far a more fortunate show, that greatly benefited from its "singable, fresh melodies" and the careful ensemble work of the principal artists. Some however found Balfe's 1843 opera dated. La Presse (2–3 January 1870) wrote: "Our generation neither knows nor applauds the Maestro Balfe." Despite the warm reception on the opening night and the generally positive reviews, the production was only moderately successful, receiving a total of 29 performances.

By this time Pasdeloup had already decided that he was ready to leave. Having offered his resignation some weeks earlier, he officially retired as director on 31 January 1870. He did not go quietly, however, for on his last night he conducted Wagner's Rienzi. The deteriorating political situation, which would soon result in the Franco-Prussian War, had made his cause increasingly difficult, and the receipts were a meagre 2,000 francs. He left the company with a personal loss of 80,000 francs. Marie Escudier had written in La France Musicale (23 January 1870) that "he leaves with his head high and his hands clean. Everyone has been paid except one. Discouraged and ruined after two years of incessant fatigue and dogged efforts, it is he."

Finding a new director was going to take some time, so the artists banded together and attempted to manage the company themselves. They sought additional funds from the Minister of Fine Arts, and did receive a slight increase of 10,000 francs in the existing subvention, now a total of 60,000 francs for four months. Pasdeloup allowed them to have the company's scenery and costumes free of charge. They were also able to use the theatre rent free and obtained a reduction in the charges for the lighting and operational costs (not that the owner, the Municipality of Paris, had much choice in the matter). They needed a new production as soon as possible and were able to obtain from Émile Perrin, now the director of the Opéra, the rights to Halévy's five-act grand opera Charles VI. Perrin was also to provide them with the sets that had been used for the original 1843 production at the Opéra, even though it had not been heard there since 1850. (Only one salon scene was damaged, and the Odéon generously provided a replacement free of charge.) With the political situation as it was, the nationalistic sentiments of the opera, with its cries of "Guerre aux tyrans!" ("War on the tyrants!"), provided some hope for success.

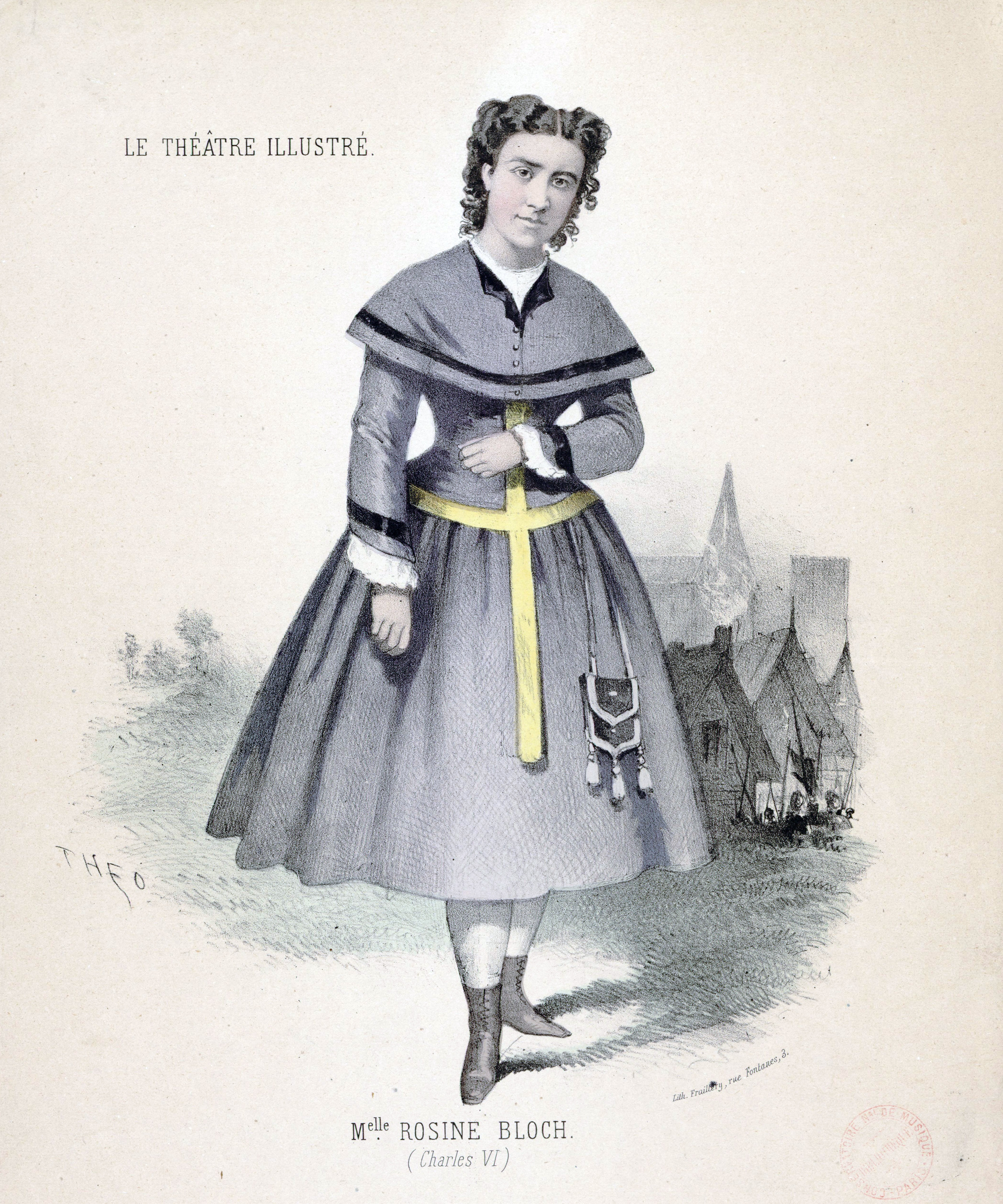
Rosine Bloch as Odette in Charles VI (1869)

There were of course difficulties getting the production ready. The mezzo-soprano, Hélène Brunet-Lafleur, who was to sing the all-important role of Odette, became ill and eventually withdrew. Perrin again stepped into the breach and provided Rosine Bloch from the Opéra as her replacement. Marie Schroeder, who was cast as Queen Isabelle, also became ill and had to be replaced with Joséphine Daram. The opening, which had been announced for 16 March, had to be postponed, since Bloch came down with influenza. The opera was finally performed on 5 April 1870, but apparently patriotism did not provide the needed boost, and the production's reception was tepid at best with a total of 22 representations. Henri Lavoix fils, writing in the Revue et Gazette Musicale (10 April 1870), congratulated the artists for having succeeded in getting it staged and then proceeded to list all the cuts that had been made, which included the ballet in Act II and the finale of Act III among others, adding up to almost 140 pages of the orchestral score, and still thought some portions were too long.

The next planned production, already in rehearsal since the middle of February, was Friedrich von Flotow's three-act opéra comique L'ombre. Marie Cabel, who at this point was rather far along in her career, was finding her part too high, and may have been having some difficulty coping with the presence of Marie Roze, who was almost twenty years younger. Early in April Cabel contracted bronchitis, and by 17 April 1870 the production had to be abandoned. (The work transferred to the Opéra-Comique, where it opened successfully on 7 July 1870, with a cast including Jules Monjauze, Marie Roze, and Marguerite Priola in the role Cabel was to have sung. It remained in the repertory there until 1890.) The Théâtre Lyrique's season finally ended on 31 May.

=== 1870–1872: Louis Martinet ===
Among the candidates being considered as a replacement for Pasdeloup were Léon Carvalho, a Monsieur Roux (who had directed several provincial companies), Léon Sari (formerly of the Délassements-Comiques), Théodore Letellier (formerly of the Théâtre de la Monnaie), and Louis Martinet (director of Les Fantaisies Parisiennes, formerly on the boulevard des Italiens and since 1 April 1869 at a small basement theatre, the Salle de l'Athénée on the rue Scribe). The artists favored Carvalho, but Martinet eventually was awarded the post, which was announced on 28 May, and he officially became the new director on 1 July 1870.

Martinet immediately began to organize the next season, first traveling to Germany to recruit singers. He planned to open the fall season with the premiere of Edmond Membrée's L'ésclave, and Vincent Wallace's Maritana was also under consideration. A three-act opera Frédéric Barberousse by the Portuguese composer Miguel Angelo Pereira was auditioned on 30 July, but his was to be the last opera performance in the theatre. France had declared war on Germany on 16 July, and by 19 September the Siege of Paris was underway. All theatres were closed, and the Théâtre Lyrique, along with most theatres in Paris, was converted to an ambulance station. After the armistice on 28 January 1871, Martinet resumed planning for the Théâtre Lyrique's now delayed season. Rehearsals were begun for four operas, L'esclave, Offenbach's Les brigands, Boieldieu's La dame blanche, and Adam's Si j'étais roi. The season opening was scheduled for 2 April, but was delayed again when the leaders of the Paris Commune moved into the nearby Hôtel de Ville on 28 March.

During the Commune several concerts were presented in the theatre by the Fédération Artistiques, but on 25 May 1871 a fire started as a result of the fighting between the government forces and those of the Commune, and destroyed most of the building including the auditorium and the stage. The wind kept the fire from the upper part of the building near the river, where costumes, music, administrative papers, and the archives of the company were stored, and these survived. The theatre was not rebuilt until 1874 and was never again used by the Théâtre Lyrique.

== At the Salle de l'Athénée ==
Louis Martinet, briefly reopened the Théâtre Lyrique on 11 September 1871 at his smaller basement theatre at 17 rue Scribe, called the Salle (or Théâtre) de l'Athénée (capacity 760–900). Beginning in March 1872 the company's official name was changed to Théâtre-Lyrique-National, but by 7 June 1872 Martinet had to close the company down permanently due to bankruptcy.

== Subsequent companies reviving the name Théâtre Lyrique ==
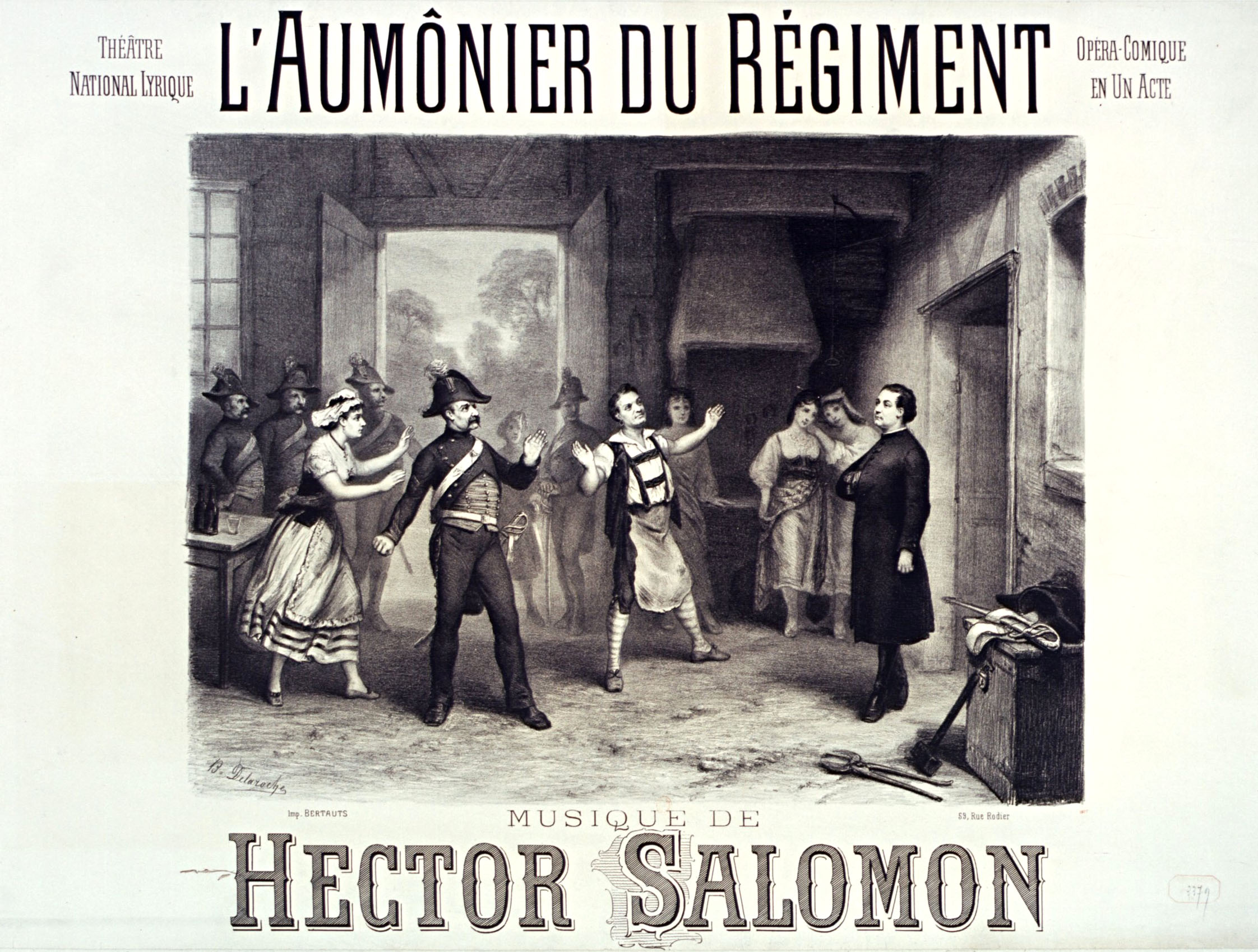
Poster for L'aumônier du régiment

The most notable of the successors to the original Théâtre Lyrique was Albert Vizentini's Théâtre National Lyrique (also called the Opéra National Lyrique and the Théâtre Lyrique National) which performed at the Théâtre de la Gaîté on the rue Papin. Vizentini, who had been principal solo violin with the original Théâtre Lyrique from 1863 to 1867, operated his company from 5 May 1876 to 2 January 1878. During this time he presented the premieres of Victorin de Joncières' Dimitri (5 May 1876), Victor Massé's Paul et Virginie (15 November 1876), Camille Saint-Saëns' Le timbre d'argent (23 February 1877), Gaston Salvayre's Le bravo (18 April 1877), and Hector Saloman's one-act opéra comique L'aumônier du régiment (14 September 1877).

Other companies reviving the name Théâtre Lyrique performed at the Théâtre du Château-d'Eau (13 October 1888 – 5 March 1889) and the Théâtre de la Renaissance near the Porte Saint-Martin (January–March 1893; March 1899 – March 1900).

== List of venues ==
Dates	Theatre	Location
15 November 1847 – 29 March 1848	Cirque Olympique	66 boulevard du Temple, Paris, 3rd arr.
27 September 1851 – 31 May 1862	Théâtre Historique	72 boulevard du Temple, Paris, 3rd arr.
30 October 1862 – 25 May 1871	Salle du Théâtre-Lyrique	Place du Châtelet, Paris, 1st arr.
11 September 1871 – 6 June 1872	Salle de l'Athénée	17 rue Scribe

== List of managing directors ==
The information in this list is from Walsh and from Levin.

- Edmond Seveste (1 May 1851 – 28 February 1852)
- Jules Seveste (4 March 1852 – 30 June 1854)
- Émile Perrin (26 July 1854 – 26 September 1855)
- Pierre Pellegrin (26 September 1855 – 20 February 1856)
- Léon Carvalho (20 February 1856 – 1 April 1860)
- Charles Réty (1 April 1860 – 4 October 1862)
- Léon Carvalho (7 October 1862 – May 1868)
- Jules Etienne Pasdeloup (22 August 1868 – 1 February 1870)
- Charles Benou (1 February 1870 – 1 July 1870)
- Louis Martinet (1 July 1870 – 6 June 1872)

== List of notable premieres and revivals ==
Premieres

- 1852: Si j'étais roi by Adolphe Adam
- 1856: Les Dragons de Villars by Aimé Maillart
- 1859: Faust by Charles Gounod
- 1861: La Statue by Ernest Reyer
- 1863: Les Pêcheurs de Perles by Georges Bizet
- 1863: Les Troyens by Hector Berlioz (second part only, as Les Troyens à Carthage)
- 1864: Mireille by Charles Gounod
- 1867: La jolie fille de Perth by Georges Bizet
- 1867: Roméo et Juliette by Charles Gounod

Revivals

- 1859: Orfée by Christoph Wilibald Gluck (preparation by Berlioz)
- 1865: Macbeth by Giuseppe Verdi (revised and expanded version)
- 1869: Rienzi by Richard Wagner

== Bibliography ==
- Bizet, Georges; Galabert, Edmond, editor (no date). Lettres à un ami, 1865–1872. Paris: Calmann-Lévy. View at Internet Archive.
- Charlton, David (1992). "Paris, §4. 1789–1870" in Sadie 1992, vol. 3, pp. 865–873.
- Curtiss, Mina (1958). Bizet and His World. New York: Knopf. OCLC 600093.
- Ellis, Katherine (2009). "Systems Failure in Operatic Paris: The Acid Test of the Théâtre-Lyrique" in Fauser and Everist 2009, pp. 49–71.
- Fauser, Annegret; Everist, Mark, editors (2009). Music, Theater, and Cultural Transfer: Paris, 1830–1914. Chicago: The University of Chicago Press. ISBN 978-0-226-23926-2.
- Fétis, F.-J. (1878). "Vizentini (Albert)" in Biographie universelle des musiciens, supplement, vol. 2, pp. 632–633. Paris: Didot. View at Google Books.
- Grayson, David (2009). "Finding a Stage for French Opera" in Fauser and Everist 2009, pp. 127–154.
- Kenney, Charles Lamb (1875). A Memoir of Michael William Balfe. London: Tinsley Brothers. View at Google Books.
- Kutsch, K. J. and Riemens, Leo (2003). Großes Sängerlexikon (fourth edition, in German). Munich: K. G. Saur. ISBN 978-3-598-11598-1.
- Lacombe, Hervé (2001). The Keys to French Opera in the Nineteenth Century. Berkeley: University of California Press. ISBN 978-0-520-21719-5.
- Langham-Smith, Richard (1992). "Paris. 5. 1870–1902" in Sadie 1992, vpl. 3, pp. 873–879.
- Lasalle, Albert (1877). Mémorial du Théâtre Lyrique. Paris: J. Lecuir. View at Google Books.
- Letellier, Robert Ignatius (2010). Opéra-Comique: A Sourcebook. Newcastle upon Tyne: Cambridge Scholars. ISBN 978-1-4438-2140-7.
- Levin, Alicia (2009). "Appendix: A Documentary Overview of Musical Theaters in Paris, 1830–1900" in Fauser and Everist 2009, pp. 379–402.
- Michaelis, Théodore (1877). Opinions et jugements de la presse parisienne sur l'Aumonier du régiment, opéra-comique en un acte; paroles de MM. de Leuven et de Saint-Georges, musique de M. Hector Salomon, représenté pour la première fois sur le théâtre national lyrique, le 14 septembre 1877. Paris: L'Agence internationale des Auteurs, Compositeurs et Écrivains. View at Gallica.
- Roqueplan, Nestor (1867). "Les Théâtres", pp. 803–844. in Paris Guide par les principaux écrivains et artistes de la France. Premiere partie: La Science – L'Art. Paris: Librairie Internationale. View at Google Books.
- Sadie, Stanley, editor (1992). The New Grove Dictionary of Opera. London: Macmillan. ISBN 978-1-56159-228-9.
- Soubies, Albert (1899). Histoire du Théâtre Lyrique, 1851–1870 Paris: Fischbacher. View at Google Books.
- Walsh, T. J. (1981). Second Empire Opera: The Théâtre Lyrique Paris 1851–1870. New York: Riverrun Press. ISBN 978-0-7145-3659-0.
- Wild, Nicole; Charlton, David (2005). Théâtre de l'Opéra-Comique Paris: répertoire 1762–1972. Sprimont, Belgium: Editions Mardaga. ISBN 978-2-87009-898-1.
- Wright, Lesley A. (1992). "Clapisson, (Antonin [Antoine-]) Louis" in Sadie 1992, vol. 1, p. 875.
