= Léon Carvalho =

French opera singer (1825–1897)

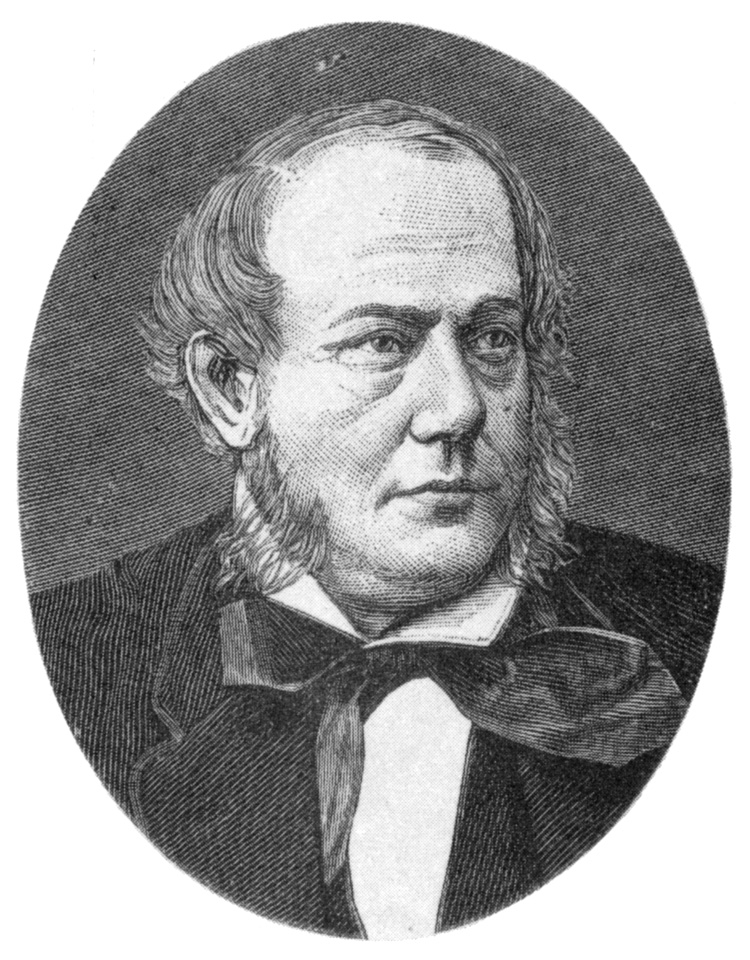
Léon Carvalho

Léon Carvalho (18 January 1825 – 29 December 1897) was a French impresario and stage director.

== Biography ==
Born Léon Carvaille in Port Louis, British Mauritius, he came to France at an early age. He studied at the Paris Conservatory and sang as a baritone at the Opéra-Comique (1850–55), where he met the soprano Marie Caroline Miolan, whom he married in 1853.

He then gave up singing and took on the direction of the Théâtre Lyrique in 1856, where he presented works by Beethoven, Mozart, Rossini, Weber, but most importantly opened his doors to new French composers turned down by the Opéra and the Opéra-Comique, such as Berlioz (he staged the first, very incomplete, performance of Les Troyens in 1863), Gounod, Bizet, Saint-Saëns and Delibes. He also staged the premiere of the revised version in a French translation of Verdi's Macbeth in 1865.

In early 1868 Carvalho started another operatic venture at the Théâtre de la Renaissance. However he was declared bankrupt on 6 May 1868, forcing him out from both theatres.

Carvalho then moved to manage the Théâtre du Vaudeville. Although the principal focus was straight plays, he revived the melodrama – a play with incidental music. He commissioned Bizet to write music for a production of Daudet's L'Arlésienne on 1 October 1872.

He became director of the Opéra-Comique in 1876, and although he promoted many new works, his choice of repertory became somewhat conservative, emphasising the traditional French repertoire. However, he also produced the premieres of Les Contes d'Hoffmann, Lakmé, Manon and Le roi malgré lui, and in his second tenure from 1891 Le Reve and L'attaque du moulin. Carvalho also brought Carmen back to the Opera-Comique in 1883, firstly in an expurgated version, and then with the creator of the title-role, Galli-Marié, and some of the more earthy elements restored.

In 1884 he prepared to bring Lohengrin to the Parisian stage, visiting Vienna to study a production there, but was eventually forced by a virulent press campaign to abandon his plan in early 1886.

After the burning of the Salle Favart in 1887, which caused the death of 84 persons, he was held responsible, condemned for negligence and imprisoned. However, after an appeal he was acquitted, and reinstated as director of the theatre in 1891, where he continued promoting new talent.

His extravagant nature, both personal and in his work as an impresario, led to debt and a succession of bankruptcies.

He died in Paris.

== Sources ==
- Le guide de l'opéra, Mancini & Rouveroux, (Fayard, 1986), ISBN 978-2-213-01563-7.
