= Alexandre Beaumont =

French librettist, playwright and novelist

- Born: Alexandre Beaume; 1 August 1827; Paris, France
- Died: 11 March 1909 (aged 64)
- Occupations: Playwright novelist

Alexandre Beaume, called Alexandre Beaumont (1 August 1827 – 11 March 1909), was a French librettist, playwright and novelist.

After he finished his studies in law he set up a law practice. He is mostly known for his literary production (novels, theatre plays and opera libretti) under the pseudonym "Alexandre Beaumont". With the help of Charles Nuitter, he translated into French the libretto by Francesco Maria Piave and Andrea Maffei for the presentation of Macbeth by Giuseppe Verdi at the Théâtre-Lyrique in Paris in 1865 and that of La Flûte enchantée for the Paris production at the Théâtre-Lyrique (1865).
