= Émile Perrin =

French painter (1814–1885)

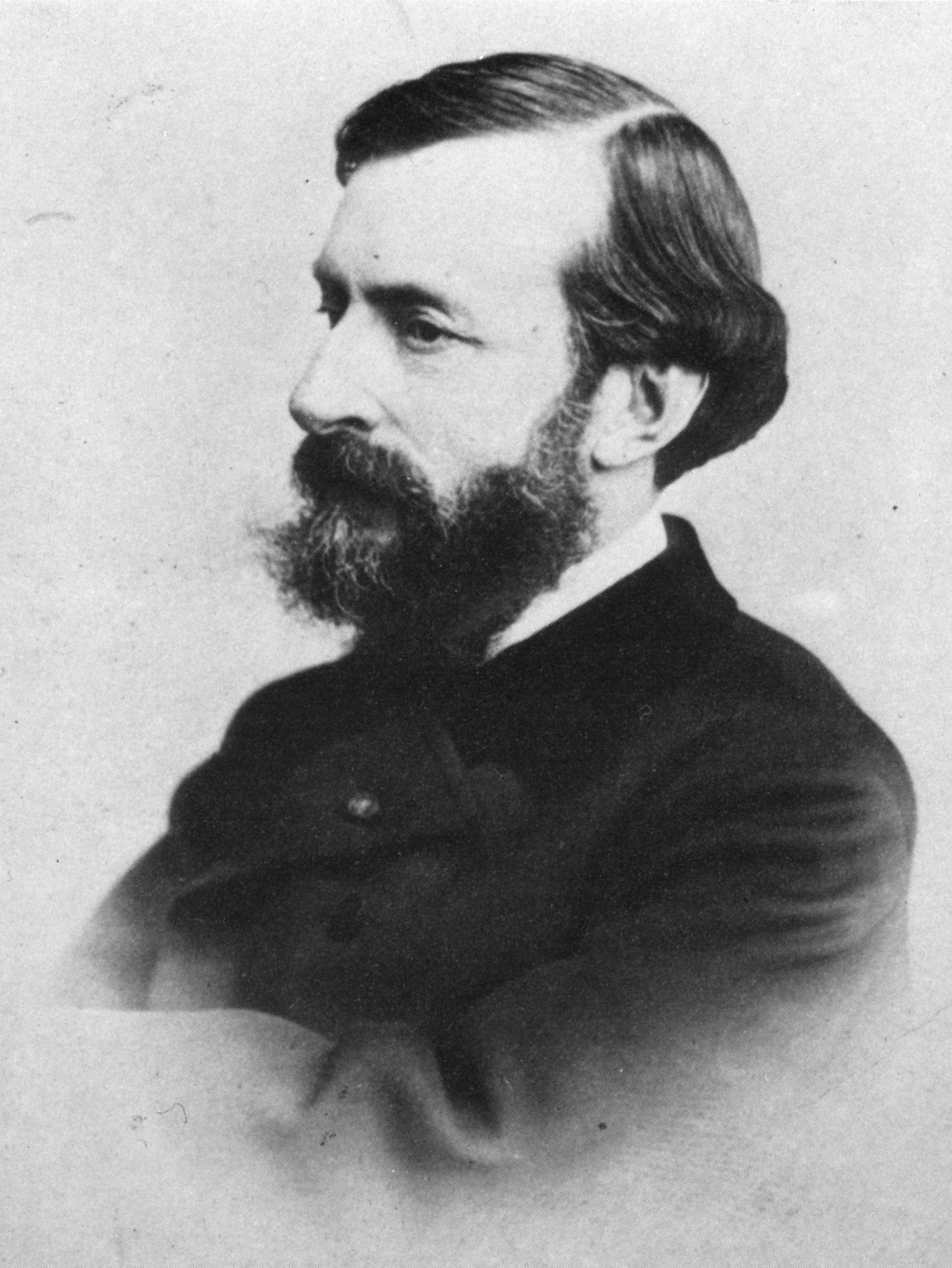
Émile Perrin

Émile-César-Victor Perrin (1814-1885) was a French painter, mainly known as a theatre director and impresario, born in Rouen on 9 January 1814, died 8 October 1885. His son-in-law was Camille du Locle.

== Biography ==
Perrin studied under Gros and Delaroche, and pursued a career as a history painter, exhibiting at the Salon. In between his appointments at the Opéra-Comique he briefly returned to painting.

He was director of the Opéra-Comique from May 1848 to November 1857, then briefly in 1862, when he 'discovered' Galli-Marié singing in Rouen. From July 1854 to September 1855 he was concurrently director of the Théâtre Lyrique, and during his short tenure the artistic and social standing of the theatre rose, although he resigned, disappointed with the results at the theatre. Wagner described him around this time as "a well-to-do bel esprit and painter".

He became director of the Opéra de Paris in December 1862. During this time he employed Bizet to play through scores submitted to the Opéra, although Perrin did not assist the composer in getting his work performed there. Victorien Sardou in a letter described Perrin as "the most volatile, the most capricious, the most changeable of men". He was dismissed from the Opéra after being accused of insufficient patriotism in May 1870.

In 1875, he was brought in to arbitrate in a dispute between Bizet and the directors of the Opéra-Comique over the preparations for Carmen, despite the fact that he loathed the piece.

He was administrator-general of the Comédie-Française from 1871 up to his death. In 1876 he became a member of the Académie des beaux-arts.
