= Jules-Sébastien Monjauze =

French opera singer

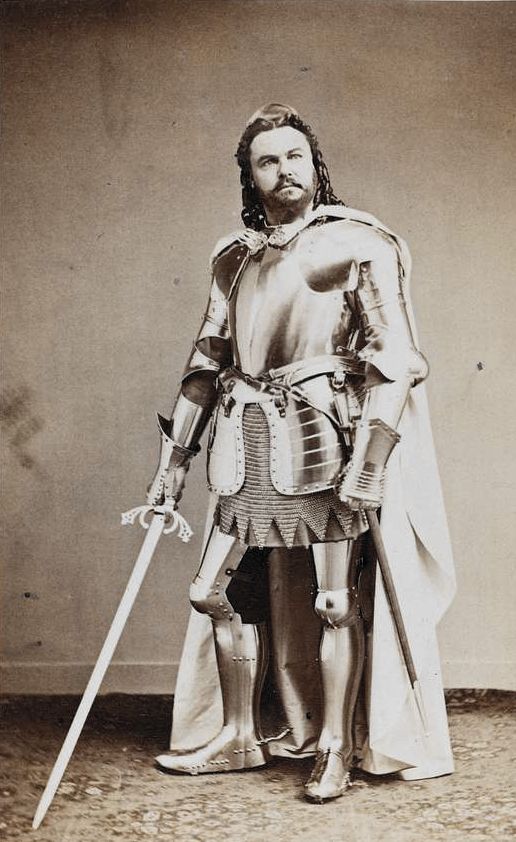
Monjauze, possibly in the role of Rienzi, 1869.

Jules-Sébastien Monjauze (also Montjauze; 25 October 1824 or 1825 – 8 September 1877) was a French operatic tenor. He created the role of Aeneas in Berlioz's Les Troyens.

== Life ==
Monjauze was born in Paris, although several contemporary publications claim he was born in Corréze. Little is known about his life before 1848, when he journeyed to Russia to escape the February Revolution. Monjauze settled in St. Petersberg, where he met and married the widow Antoinette Lejars (née Cuzent). Antoinette came from a family of equestrian circus performers, and the cast-iron statues ornamenting the entrances to the Cirque d'Hiver and Cirque d'Été may have been crafted in her likeness.

In 1852, Monjauze was accepted to the Conservatoire de Paris, where he studied voice with Antoine Ponchard. Despite this training, Monjauze was initially hired as an actor at the Théâtre-Français, where he was the protégé of Adolphe-Simonis Empis, the company's administrateur général. Monjauze performed with the company until 1858, when he transitioned to the Théâtre Lyrique, one of four opera companies in Paris. There, he was cast as the principal tenor in many French language premieres, including Wagner's Rienzi and Verdi's Violetta, Macbeth, and Rigoletto. In addition to Aeneas in Les Troyens, Monjauze created the roles of Maurice in Halévy's Jaguarita l'Indienne, Sélim in Reyer's La statue, and Prince Gaston de Listenay in Clapisson's La Fanchonnette, among others.

In 1865, Monjauze received a cross of the Order of Isabella after publishing a collection of original compositions that paid homage to the Queen.

Monjauze may have died by suicide or from an erysipelas infection.
