= Célestine Galli-Marié =

French mezzo-soprano (1837–1905)

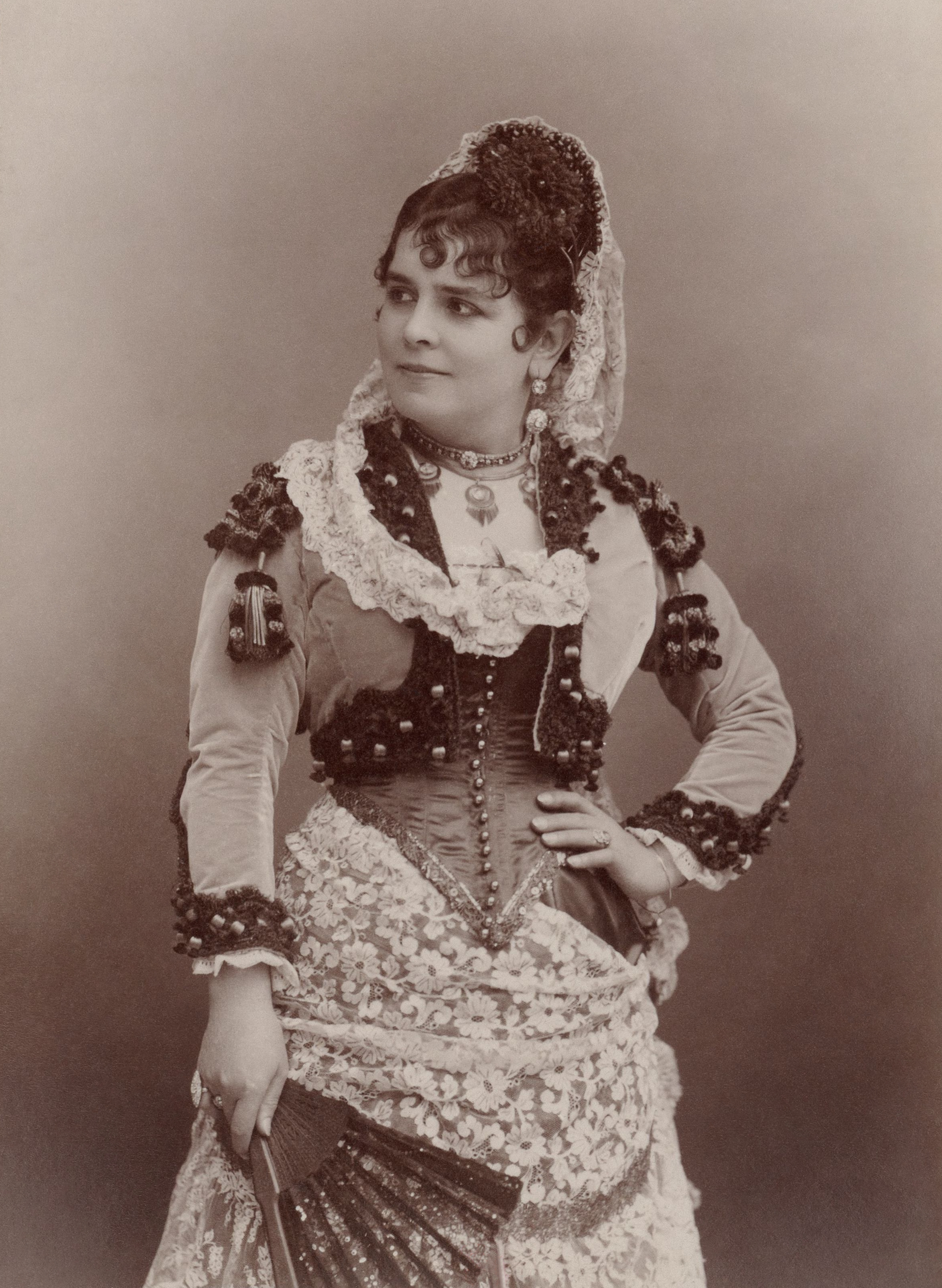
- Galli-Marié was the original Carmen; photo by Atelier Nadar
- Born: November 1840; Paris, France
- Died: 22 September 1905 (aged 64); Vence, France
- Occupation: Operatic mezzo-soprano

Célestine Galli-Marié (French pronunciation: [selɛstin ɡali maʁje]; November 1840 – 22 September 1905) was a French mezzo-soprano, who is most famous for creating the title role in Georges Bizet's Carmen.

== Early life ==
She was born Marie-Célestine Laurence Marié de l'Isle in November 1840 in Paris. (Note: One source claims 15 March 1837 as her birth date) She was taught singing by her father, Mécène Marié de l'Isle, who also had a successful opera career. Her début came in 1859 in Strasbourg, and she sang in Italian in Lisbon. At the age of fifteen, she had married a sculptor named Galli (who died in 1861) and thus took her stage name, Galli-Marié.

== Career ==
Émile Perrin, the director of the Opéra-Comique, heard her performing Balfe's The Bohemian Girl at Rouen and brought her to Paris. She sang at the Opéra-Comique until 1885, premiering in Pergolesi's La serva padrona. Her most famous roles were in Thomas's Mignon (1866) and Bizet's Carmen (1875). It was said that at the 33rd performance of Carmen on 2 June 1875, Galli-Marié had a premonition of Bizet's death while singing the cards scene in Act III, and fainted when she left the stage; the composer, in fact, died that night, and the next performance was cancelled due to her indisposition. Undertaking much touring, she performed Carmen in Brussels (16 January 1876), Naples (the Italian premiere), Genoa, Barcelona, Lyon, Liege and Dieppe before returning in the Opéra-Comique revival of the original production on 22 October 1883. In London, she appeared at Her Majesty's Theatre in a touring production in 1886, and returned to the Opéra-Comique in 1890 to sing in a fundraising performance to erect a monument to Bizet (this was her final performance).

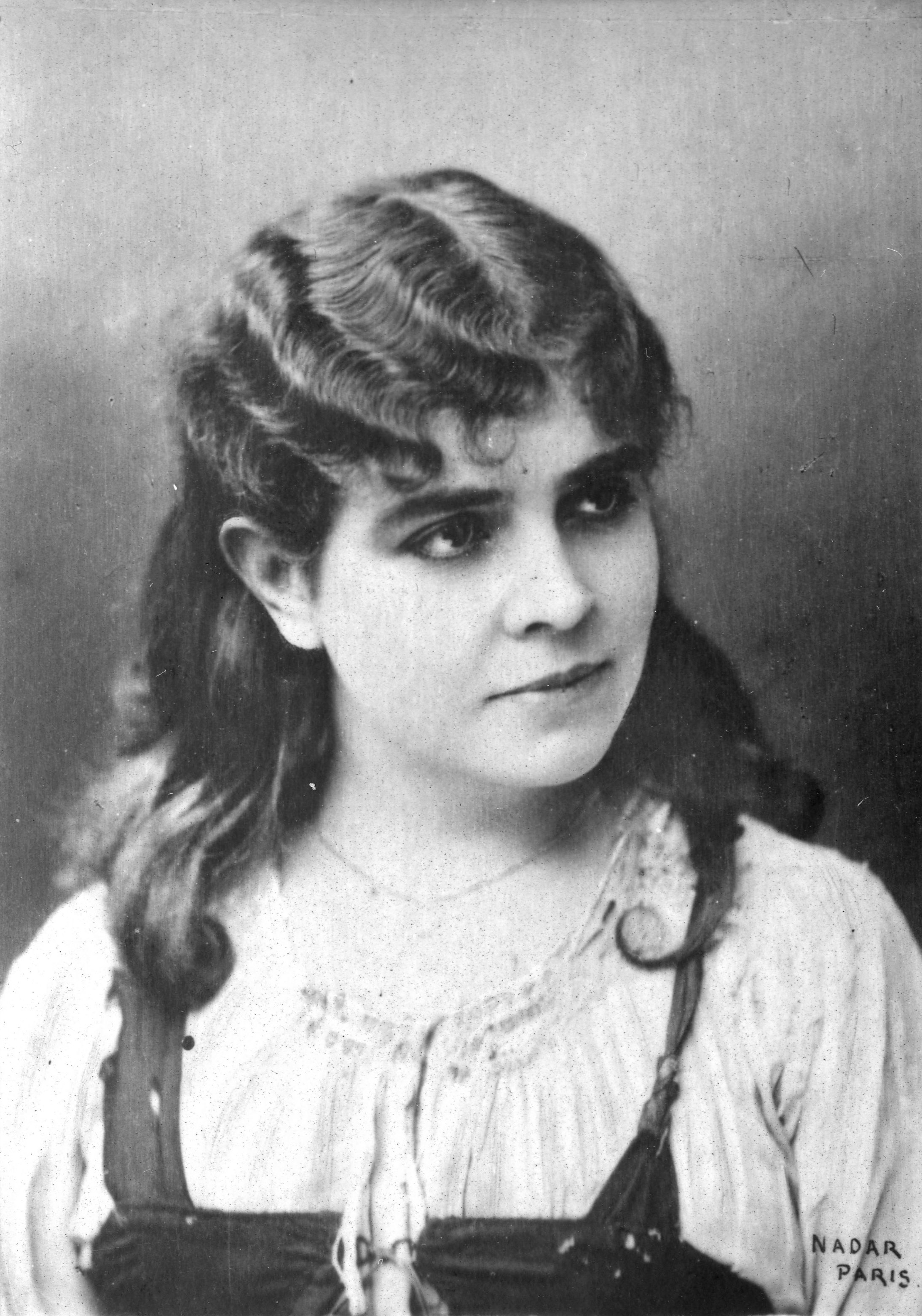
Galli-Marié premiered the rôle of Mignon in 1866.

She also created the roles of Lazarille in Massenet's Don César de Bazan, Offenbach's Vendredi in Robinson Crusoé and the title role in Fantasio. She performed as Kaleel in Aimé Maillart's Lara and as Blandine in François-Auguste Gevaert's Le Capitaine Henriot. She sang in Victor Massé's Fior d'Aliza, Théophile Semet's La Petite Fadette, and Ernest Guiraud's Piccolino. She also appeared as Taven in Gounod's Mireille and Rose Friquet in Maillart's Les dragons de Villars. Sometime in the late 1860s and early 1870s she and the composer Émile Paladilhe became lovers. Curtiss notes that she kept pet marmosets, and sometimes took them to rehearsal.

She died on 22 September 1905, in Vence, France.

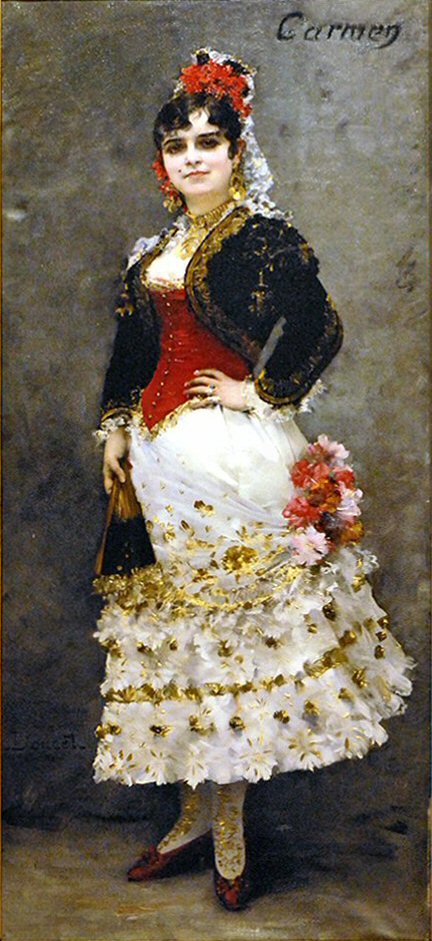
Galli-Marié as Carmen, by Henri Lucien Doucet (1884), musée de Marseille, Marseille

Her voice was described as being of a good timbre, with clear diction and phrasing. A high mezzo-soprano voice was at one time referred to as "Galli-Marié". Galli-Marié roles are now sometimes sung by sopranos.

== Family ==
Her sisters Irma and Paola were also professional singers. Irma created roles in L'amour chanteur in 1864 and in Les bergers in 1865; she toured the US before returning to the Paris Opéra-Comique. Paola was prominent in operetta and created roles for Charles Lecocq, appearing a great deal in the US. Galli-Marié and Irma sang together in Madeleine at the Théâtre des Bouffes Parisiens in 1869.

== Notes and references ==
Notes
