= Azzolini =

Azzolini is an Italian surname. Notable people with the surname include:

- Claudio Azzolini (1940–2025), Italian politician and journalist
- Giovanni Bernardino Azzolini (c. 1572–1645), Italian painter and sculptor
- Sergio Azzolini (born 1967), Italian classical bassoonist and conductor
- Tito Azzolini (1837–1907), Italian architect

== See also ==
- Azzolino
