= Synagogue of Bologna =

Synagogue in Bologna

- Sinagoga di Bologna
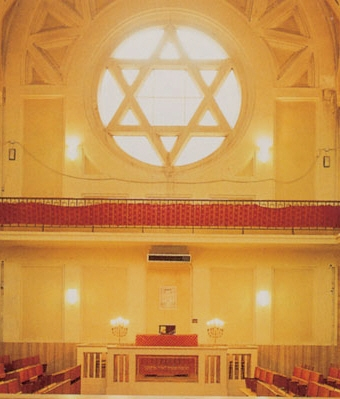
- Synagogue interior in 2008

Religion
- Affiliation: Judaism
- Region: Emilia-Romagna
- Year consecrated: 1928; 1954 (rebuilt)

Location
- Location: Via De' Gombruti 9, Bologna
- Country: Italy
- Interactive map of Synagogue of Bologna
- Coordinates: 44°29′37″N 11°20′13″E

Architecture
- Demolished: 1943

The current and modern Synagogue of Bologna (Italian: Sinagoga di Bologna) was built in 1928 in Bologna, Italy, and was rebuilt in 1954 after its destruction in the Second World War. It overlooks Via Mario Finzi 4, and its entrance is on Via De' Gombruti 9. It is currently in use by the city's local Jewish community.

== Congregational history and earlier synagogues ==
In the Jewish ghetto of Bologna, in the shadow of the Two Towers, between 1586 and 1593, the Jewish community met in a syngogue. That original synagogue in the city only remains as the building on Via dell'Inferno 16, which is mixed us in the modern day. Congregations date before the formal synagogue, at least back to 1559, when Bishop Eustachio Locatelli, designated inquisitor, confiscated their books. There has been a Jewish presence in the city since at least the 4th century AD.

At the end of the 18th century, the community re-established itself following a temporary dispersion a cause de the Caeca et Obdurata. A small oratory was founded by Angelo Carpi from Cento in 1829 in his home around Piazza Malpighi. In 1868, a room was rented in the building on Via De' Gombruti 7, which was also in the boundaries of the original ghetto.

== Founding of the synagogue ==
From 1874 to 1877, a new, larger prayer space was inaugurated in the wing of the current location, which is on Via Mario Finzi. At the beginning of the 20th century, an overhaul was carried out to build a larger, more formal space, and it was inaugurated as such on November 4, 1928. The project, led by Attilio Muggia, was designed as an elegant square-shaped room divided between three naves, with cross-vaults leading to an elliptical skylight. The walls were adorned with designs of the Art Nouveau style.

== Modern history and design ==
The synagogue was destroyed in 1943 during the Allied bombings of WWII. It was rebuilt in the same location in September 1954, designed by Guido Muggia, the son of Attilio, who wanted to give a modern take on his father's original design. Restoration work was carried out in 2008 and 2009. Rubble was removed from the basement, which led to the discovery of the remains of an ancient Roman domus from the Imperial period. Bishop Carlo Caffarra commemorating the conclusion of the restoration.

The interior remained the same. The Torah ark section, bordered by a marble balustrade, is illuminated by a large window with polychrome stained glass. The women's section overlooks the entrance and the two aisles to the side. All the furnishings are modern. On the facade, there is a large rose window with the Star of David. A plaque next to the door on the outside commemorates the 84 Bolognese victims of the Holocaust with the verse of Lamentations 1:18.

In 2014, the synagogue commemorated its 60th anniversary with a performance by the Orchestra from the Conservatory of Bologna.

In January 2025, following the death of an Egyptian student during a police chase, the synagogue was subject to vandalism and rioting. Slogans were graffittied onto the building and explosives and other incindiary devices were thrown at it. The violence was denounced by city mayor Matteo Lepore, who expressed solidarity with the Jews in the city. Jonathan Peled, ambassador to Italy, dennounced the attack as antisemitic.
