= Azzolino =

Azzolino is both a surname and a given name. Notable people with the name include:

- Decio Azzolino (1623–1689), Italian cardinal and code-breaker
- Azzolino Bernardino della Ciaja (1671–1755), Italian organist, harpsichordist, and composer

== See also ==
- Azzolini
