= Park of Montagnola, Bologna =

Public park in Bologna, Italy

Coordinates: 44.5026°N 11.3464°E

Park of Montagnola
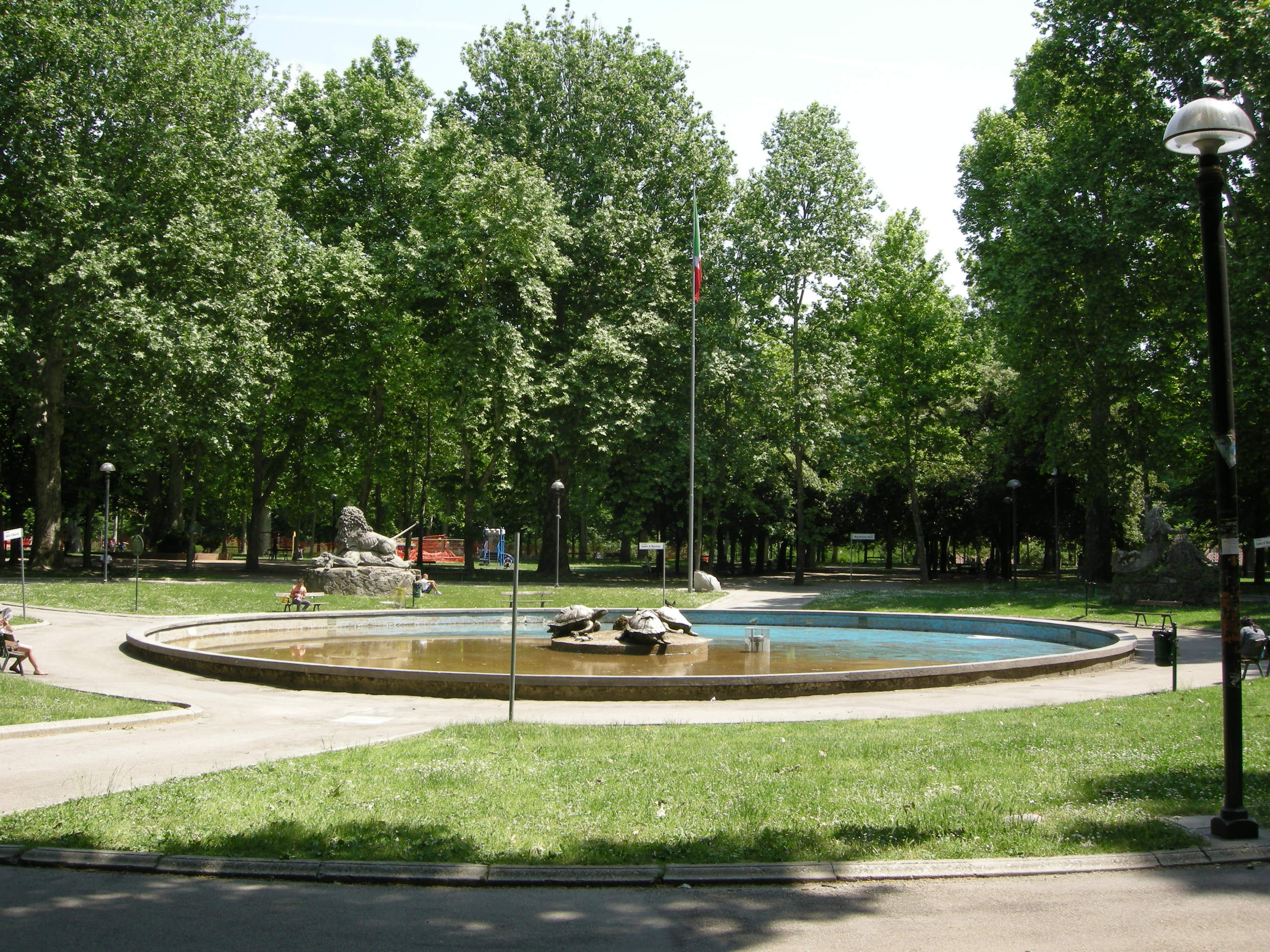
- The central pool
- Interactive map of Park of Montagnola
- Type: Public park
- Location: Bologna
- Area: About 6 ha (15 acres)
- Created: 1808
- Operator: Comune di Bologna

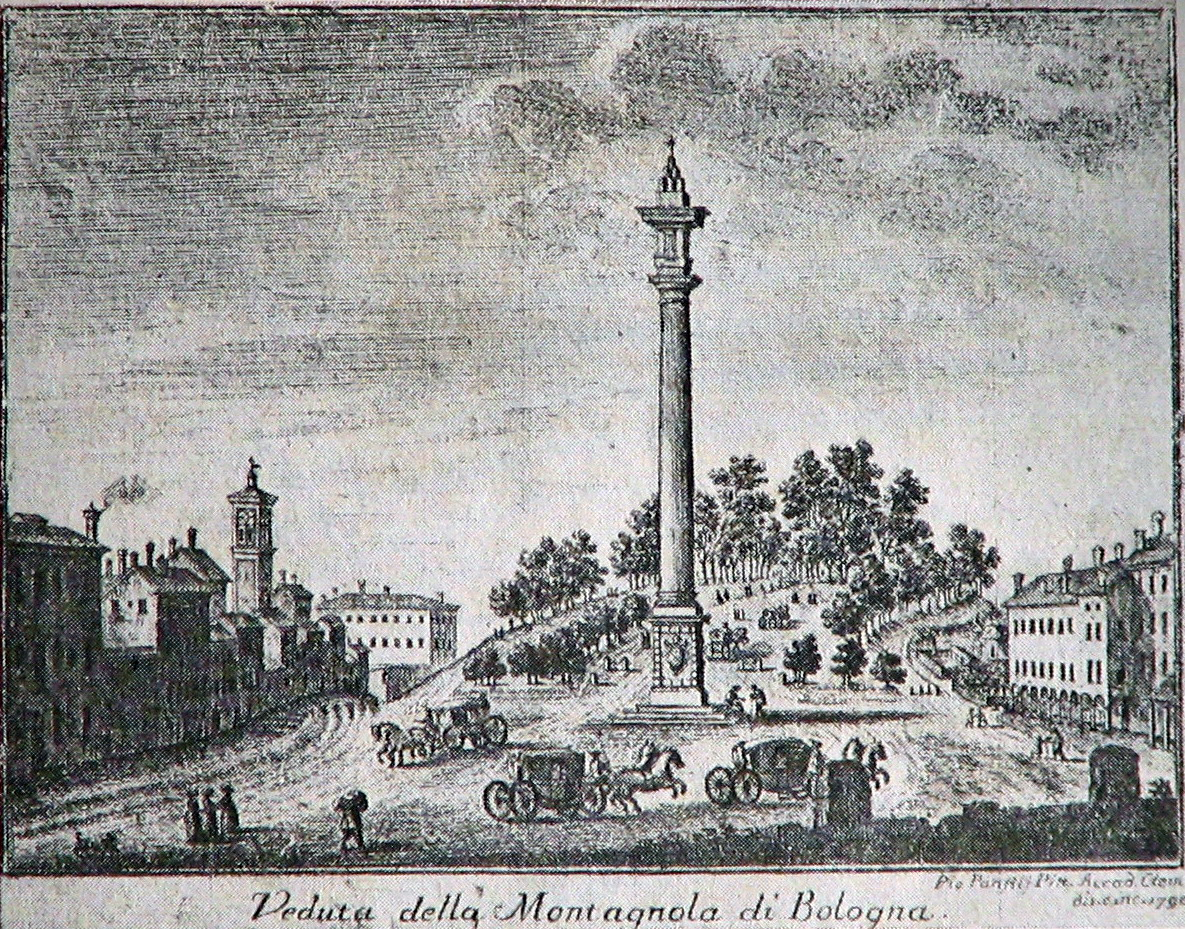
The Montagnola at the end of the 18th century

The Park of Montagnola is one of the oldest and greenest public parks in the centre of Bologna, Italy. It was first opened in the 17th century. It commemorates the victory of the Italians over the Austrians in 1848. The park has a number of 19th and early 20th century sculptures. It is used for various events.

== History ==
The Montagnola is an artificial plateau formed by the accumulation of debris from the nearby 14th century Galliera Castle. This castle had been built by Bertrando del Poggetto to house the pope and his court. It was later destroyed by mobs. The park was opened to the public in 1664, though it was undeveloped until the end of the 18th century. Here, on 6 January 1798, the remains of Luigi Zamboni and Giovanni Battista De Rolandis were solemnly buried by direct order of Napoleon. In 1799, with the arrival of the Austrians, the remains were dispersed.

In 1805, by order of the Napoleonic rulers, it was decided to turn it into a public garden. The design was entrusted to Giovan Battista Martinetti, who designed a circular street layout. Work on the new gardens was completed in 1808.

== Description ==
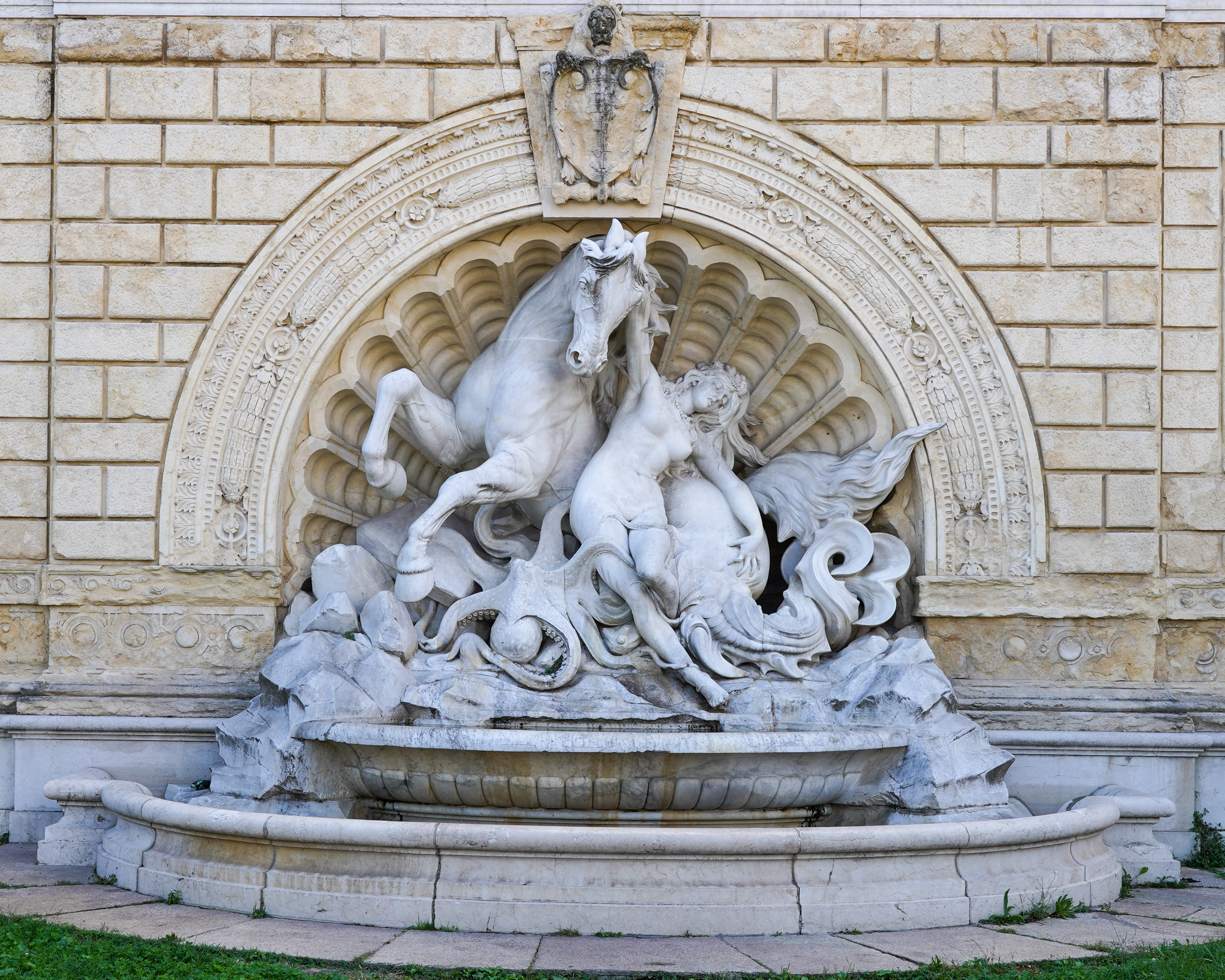
Fountain of the Nymph in the Pincio stairs

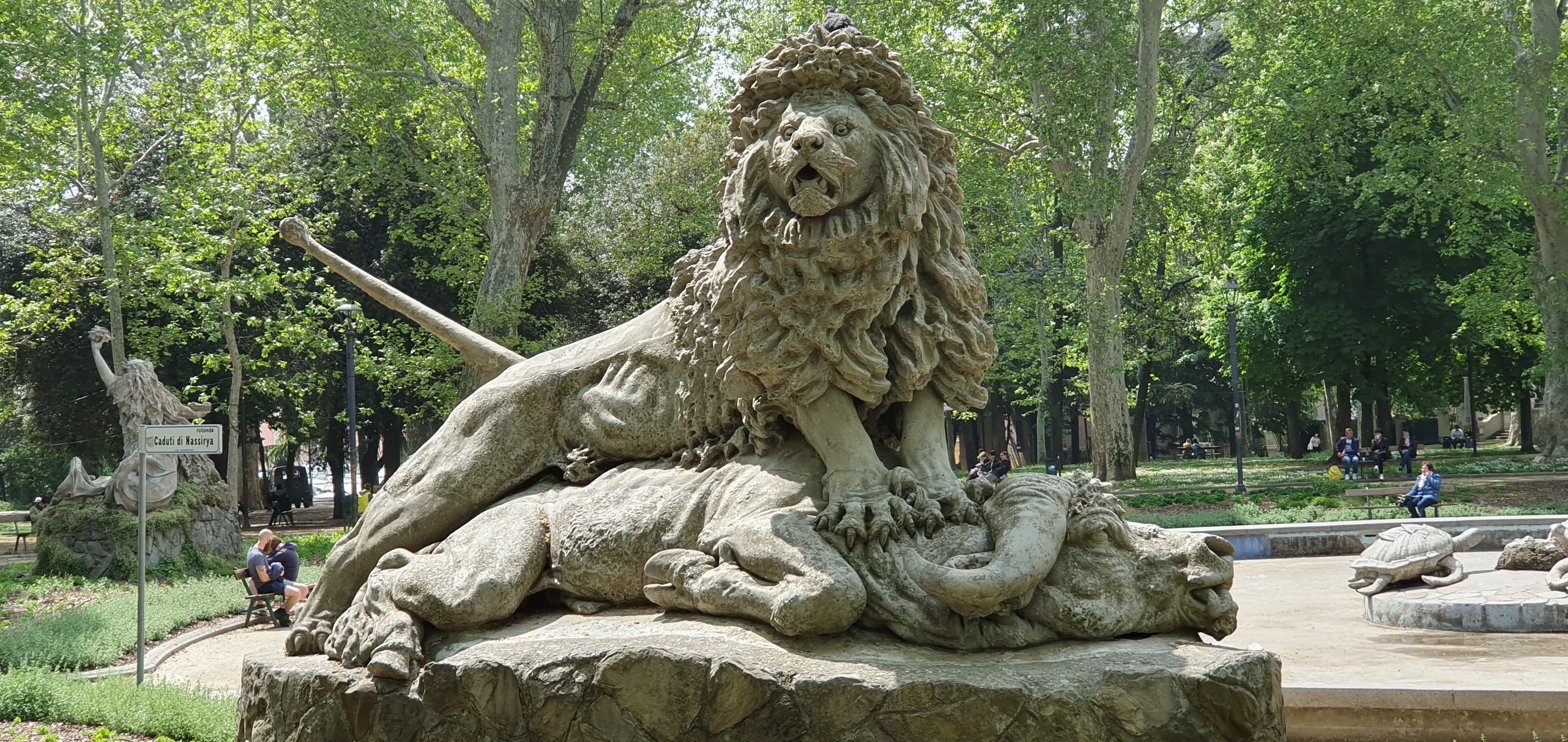
Concrete sculpture of a lion by Diego Sarti, late 19th century.

The raised plateau of the park contains the ruins of the 14th-century Castello di Galliera. On the northwest side, a scenographic Pincio staircase (1893–1896), designed by Tito Azzolini and Attilio Muggia, leads up to the park. The stairs are decorated by sculptural reliefs and statues inspired by the history of Bologna, created by Arturo Orsoni, Pietro Veronesi, Tullo Golfarelli, Ettore Sabbioni, and Arturo Colombarini. At the centre of the Park is a circular pool completed for the Exposition of the province of Emilia in 1888. It is surrounded by animal sculptures by Diego Sarti.

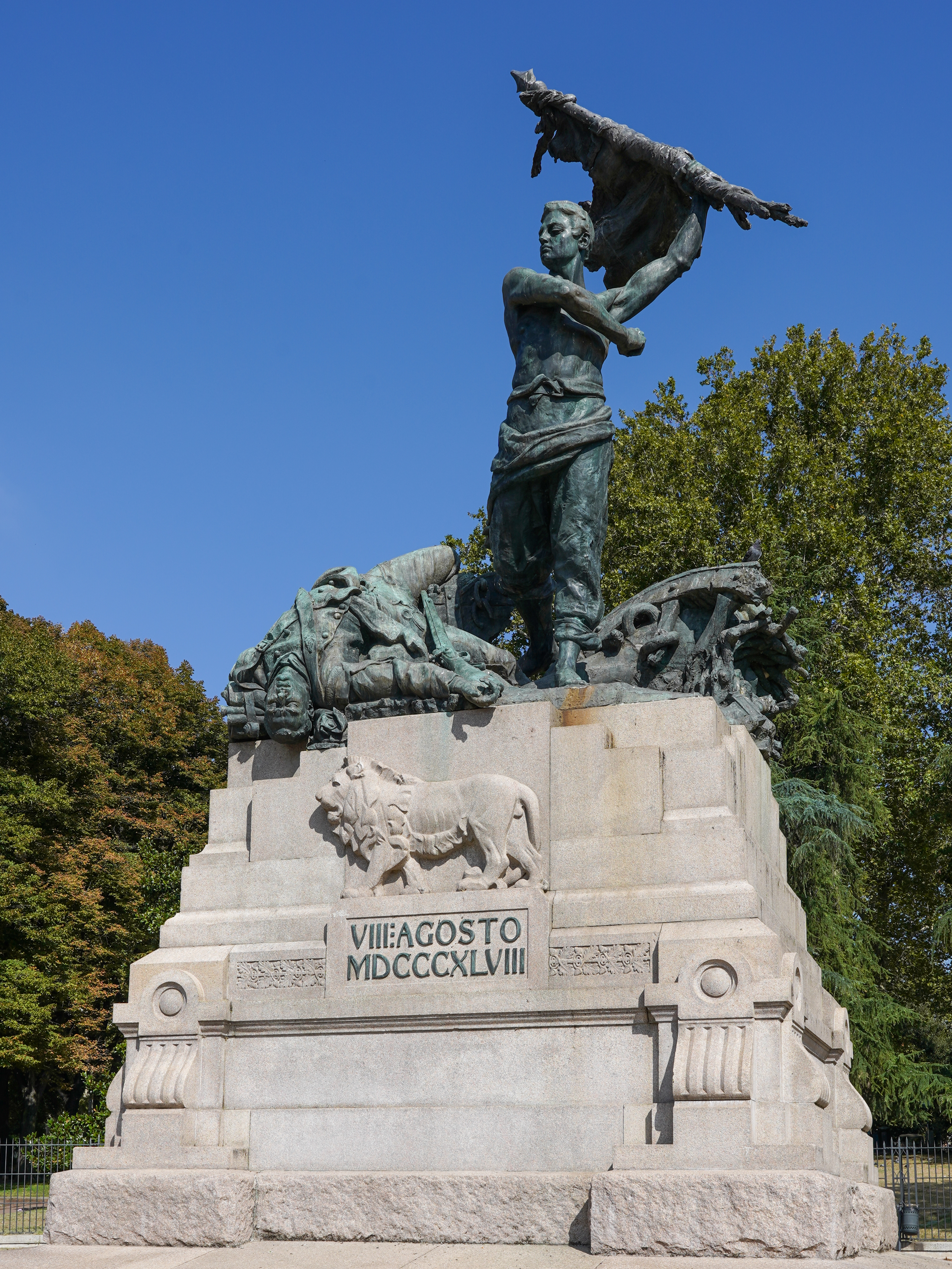
8 August 1848 War Memorial, Montagnola Park

The park was also the site of the "Battle of Montagnola" on 8 August 1848, in which Italian revolutionaries from Bologna defeated and temporarily expelled the Austrians. The south entrance to the park is on Via Irnerio, facing Piazza VIII Agosto. The entrance contains a War Memorial commemorating 8 August 1848, sculpted by Pasquale Rizzoli in 1903.

== Flora ==
The park has plane trees (Platanus sp.) hundreds of years old, dating from the Napoleon era.

== Events ==
The park is used for performances, games and sports competitions. In the Piazza VIII Agosto, and the street inside the park, a large market called 'La Piazzola', also known as the 'Montagnola market', is held every Friday and Saturday.
