= Tito Azzolini =

Italian architect, active mostly in or near Bologna

Tito Azzolini (June 1837 in Bologna – December 8, 1907) was an Italian architect, active mostly in or near Bologna.

== Biography ==
In 1857, he studied architecture and perspective at the Accademia of Fine Arts of Bologna, under Francesco Cocchi. For a few years, worked as a scenographer for a number of theaters, including the Teatro Apollo of Rome. In 1867, he became a professor at the Royal Institute of Fine Arts of Bologna. He was also a Consigliere municipale and inspector of archeology (scavi) and monuments.

In Bologna, he labored in scenography for the Teatro Comunale and sent his pupils to study the art as it was practiced in Vienna and Monaco, especially Wagnerian works. He helped design theaters in Bologna and Sinigaglia. He helped design a new cemetery or Camposanto for Sinigaglia. His design for the facade of the palazzo municipale of Budrìo was completed by Azzolini.

Along with the engineer, Attilio Muggia, he constructed porticos and outdoor staircases (1893–96) in the Park of Montagnola (1893–96) .

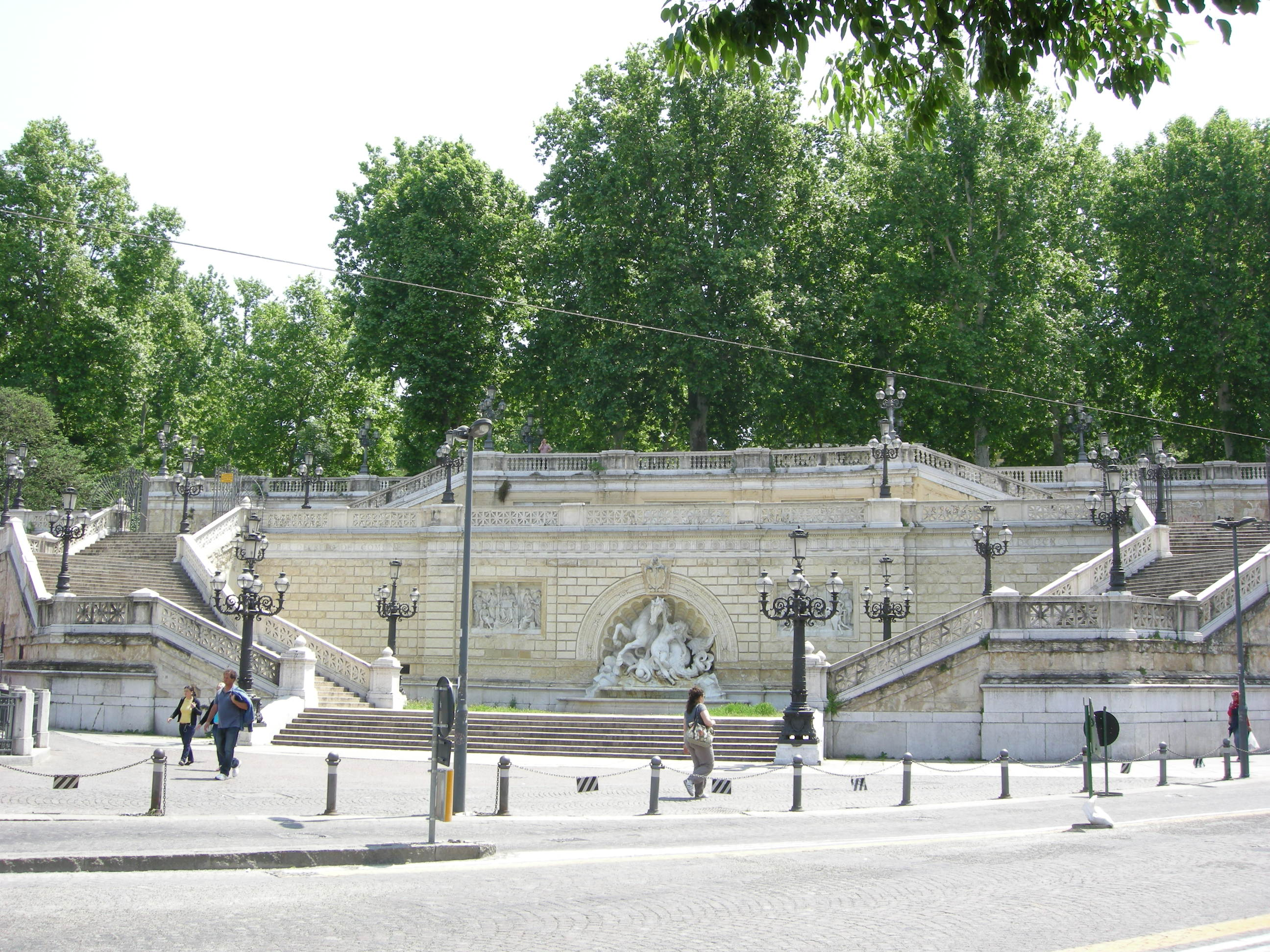
Park and Gardens of Montagnola in Bologna

He helped in the restoration of the Casa Vecchietti (1883); Casa Gradi (1884); the House of the Carracci; casa della Garisenda; the church of San Michele in Bosco (refacing the cupola of the bell-tower, 1890); the Castle of S. Martino sopra Zena, the church of San Marone a Porto Civitanova, the facade of the palazzo comunale of Vergato. He also designed the fake palace of the Savings Bank of Pistoia (he won the national competition in 1897). Azzolini followed the rules of the competition, which required work on a Palace in a renaissance style recalling the Florentine Quattrocento and was inspired by the Palazzo Strozzi.

His submission for the Monument of Vittorio Emanuele II in Rome, won only second prize. While he garnered the first prize for the monument to those Fallen during the Five Days of Milan, his design for the monument was not pursued. He won a second prize for his design of the facade of the cathedral of Milan. in 1904, he succeeded Panzacchi as President of the Accademia di Belle Arti.
