= Attilio Muggia =

Attilio Giacomo Muggia (Venice, 2 April 1861 – Bologna, 18 February 1936) was an Italian engineer and architect.

== Life and career ==
Muggia was born in Venice to a Jewish family.

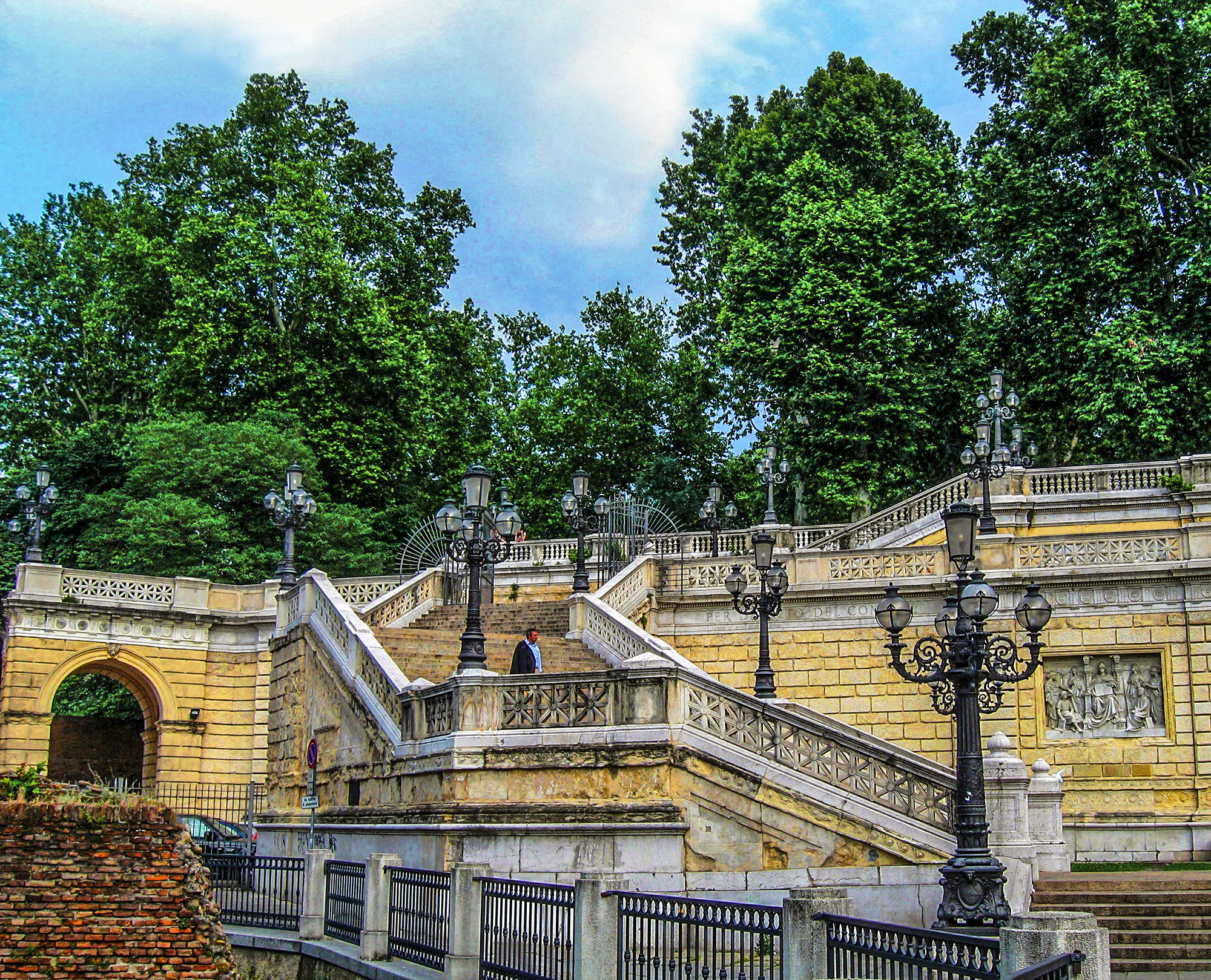
Pincio stair ramps (Bologna)

One of his most notable projects was the monumental staircase in the Park of Montagnola, Bologna designed in collaboration with Tito Azzolini and inaugurated in 1896.

Muggia was a pioneer in Italy of the use of reinforced concrete. In 1900, he designed Villa Gini in Borgo Panigale which was the first civil building in Italy to use reinforced conrete. He was responsible for the construction of the Synagogue of Bologna.

From 1905 to 1925, he was general technical director of the Società Costruzioni Cementizie with offices in Bologna and Florence.

He held the chair of technical architecture at the Bologna engineering school from 1912 to 1935.

He died in 1936 and is buried in the Jewish section of Certosa di Bologna monumental cemetery in Bologna.
