= Badiali (surname) =

Badiali is an Italian surname. Notable people with the surname include:

- Cesare Badiali (1810–1865), Italian baritone opera singer
- Giuseppe Badiali (1797–after 1850), Italian painter and scenic designer
