= Palazzo Legnani Pizzardo, Bologna =

Coordinates: 44°29′28.01″N 11°20′30.03″E

Palazzo Legnani Pizzardi
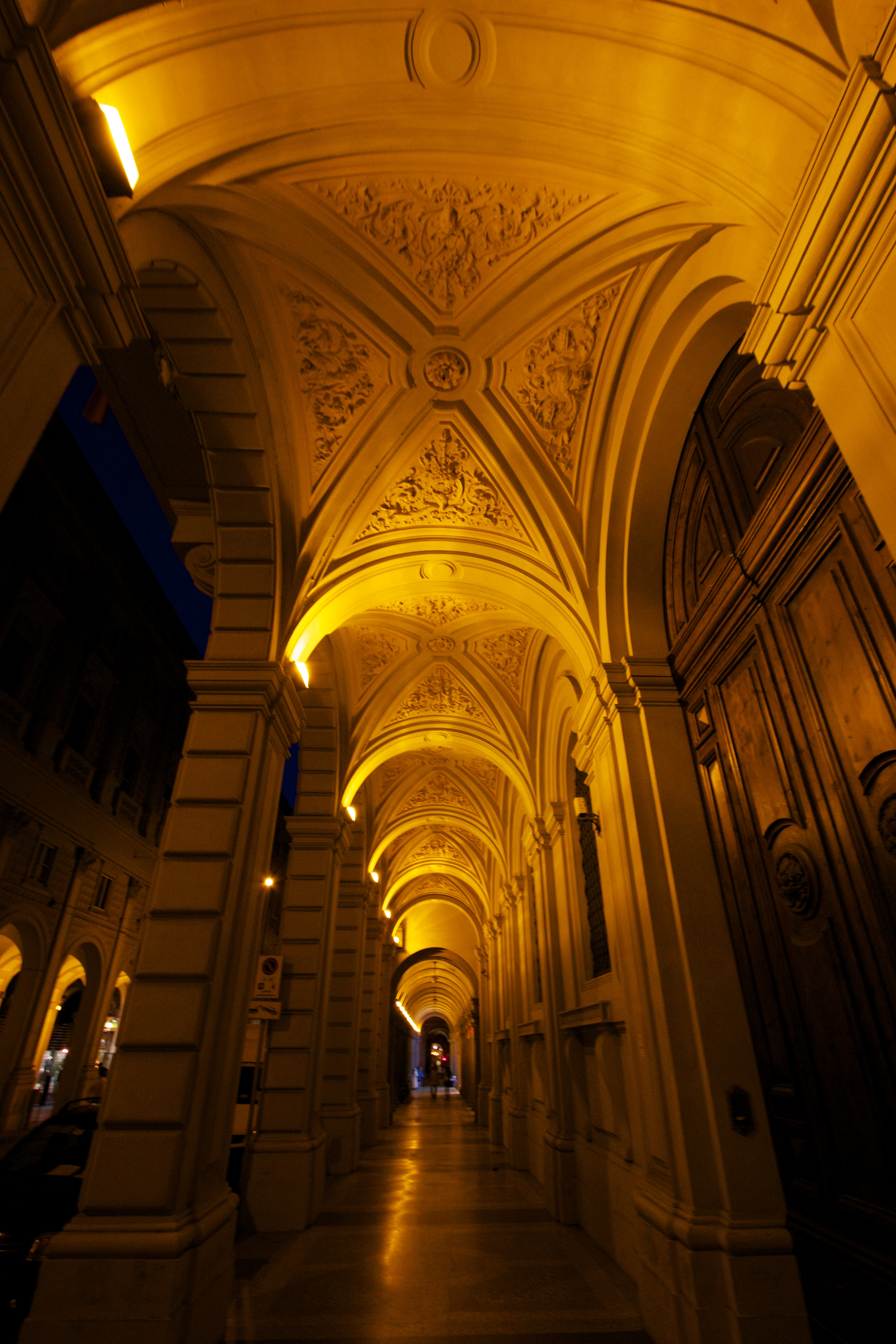
- Street portico of palace
- Interactive map of the Palazzo Legnani Pizzardi area

General information
- Architectural style: Renaissance architecture
- Location: Bologna, Italy
- Construction started: 1519

The Palazzo Legnani Pizzardi, also known as Palazzo Pizzardi e Volta or just Palazzo Pizzardi, is a Renaissance style palace located on Via d'Azeglio #38, on the corner with Via Farini, in central Bologna, Italy. In 2015, the palace housed the Tribunal of Bologna.

== History ==
Construction of the present palace was begun in the late 1500s, at the site of a former palace belonging to the Carbonesi family, and bought in 1379 by the famed judge Giovanni da Legnano, and Vicar General of Bologna in 1377. In 1506 the Legnani were made a senatorial family by Pope Julius II. In 1587, Alessandro Legnani commissioned the facade from Francesco Terribilia and Francesco Guerra.

The grand entrance staircase was designed by the 17th-century architect Gabriele Chellini. The palace was decorated with frescoes by Giovanni Antonio Burrini and stucco by Giuseppe Maria Mazza. In 1757, the last Legnani of senatorial rank, Filippo Legnani, died. At one time the palace had quadratura decorations by Antonio Galli Bibbiena, and in the 18th-century acquired embellishments from the brothers Petronio and Francesco Tadolini, including a colossal statue of Hercules and copies of the Furietti Centaurs. By 1796, the privileges of the nobility and Senate were abolished by the French occupation, and accepted by the Gonfaloniere and owner of the palace, Legnani Ferri.

By the beginning of the 19th century, a stunning catalogue of the prominent paintings owned by the family included works by Pontormo, Paolo Veronese, Correggio, Denys Calvaert, Annibale and Agostino Carracci, Guido Reni, Prospero Fontana, Bartolomeo Cesi, Bartolomeo Passerotti, Domenichino, Elisabetta Sirani, Nicolò dell’Abate, and Donato Creti. The collection is now dispersed.

The palace had a number of owners till it was obtained by mid-century by the Marchese Camillo Pizzardi and his grandson, Luigi Pizzardi. The family owned the building till 1885. The structure was refurbished by Antonio Zannoni, which destroyed some of the prior fresco decoration, replacing it with decorative landscape frescoes. The grand Salon was converted by the Pizzardi family into a Salone del Risorgimento Italiano, with patriotic canvases depicting Charles Albert in Oporto by Antonio Puccinelli, Pier Capponi che lacera i patti imposti by Charles VIII by Alessandro Guardassoni, Cavour and Minghetti by Luigi Busi, and Napoleon III by Gaetano Belvederi. The decorative frescoes were by Gaetano Lodi.

Over the past decades various government and private offices have utilized the building.
