= Egyptian Revival decorative arts =

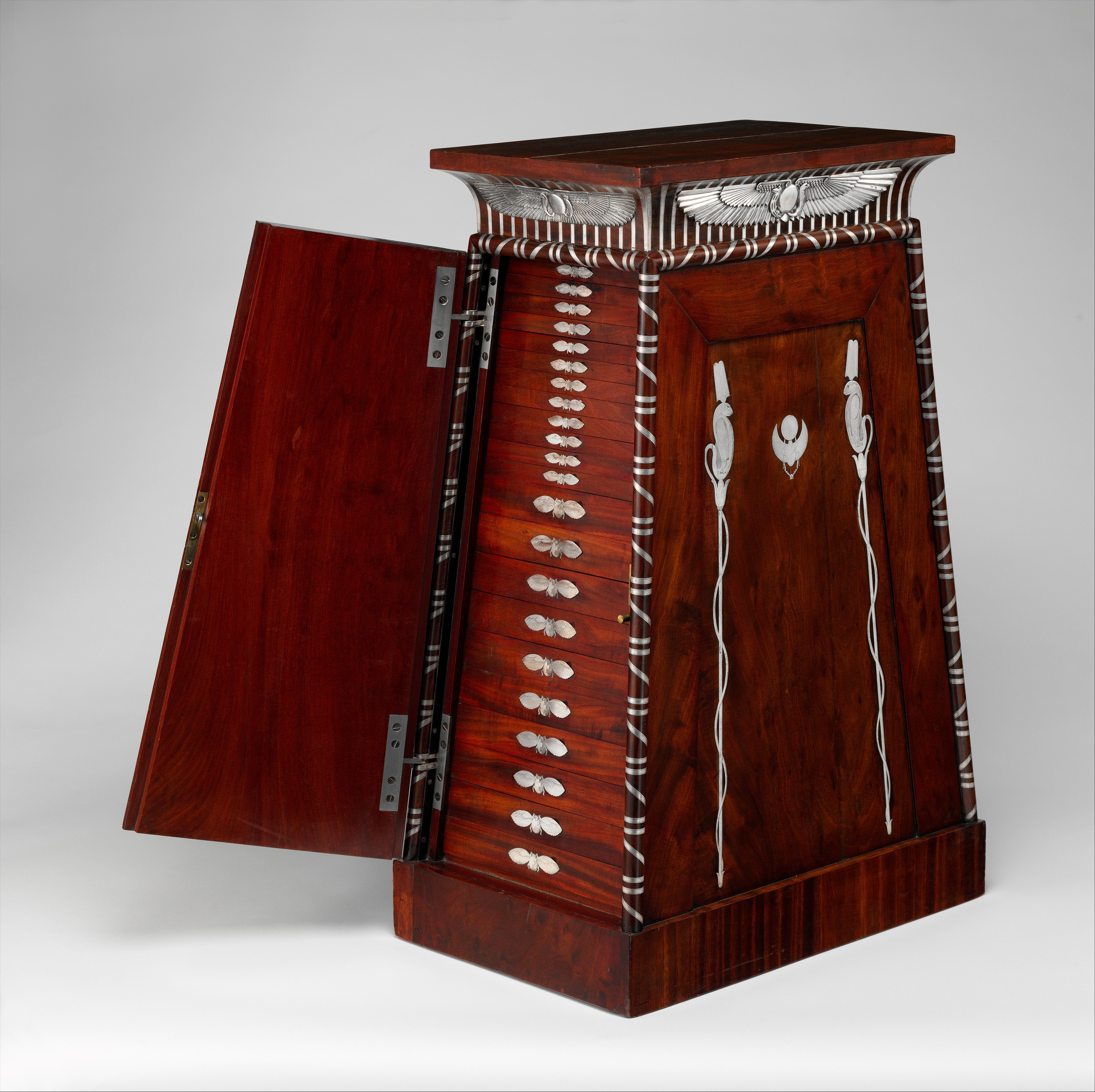
Coin cabinet; by François-Honoré-Georges Jacob-Desmalter; 1809–1819; mahogany (probably Swietenia mahagoni), with applied and inlaid silver; 90.2 x 50.2 x 37.5 cm; Metropolitan Museum of Art (New York City)

Egyptian revival decorative arts is a style in Western art, mainly of the early nineteenth century, in which Egyptian motifs were applied to a wide variety of decorative arts objects.

Enthusiasm for the artistic style of Ancient Egypt is generally attributed to the excitement over Napoleon's conquest of Egypt and, in Britain, to Admiral Nelson's defeat of Napoleon at the Battle of the Nile in 1798. Napoleon took a scientific expedition with him to Egypt. Publication of the expedition's work, the Description de l'Égypte, began in 1809 and came out in a series though 1826, inspiring everything from sofas with Sphinxes for legs, to tea sets painted with the pyramids. It was the popularity of the style that was new, Egyptianizing works of art had appeared in scattered European settings from the time of the Renaissance.

The Egyptian Gallery, a private room in the Duchess Street home of connoisseur Thomas Hope to display his Egyptian antiquities, and illustrated in engravings from his meticulous line drawings in his book, Household Furniture and Interior Decoration (1807), was a prime source for the Regency style in British furnishings. The book inspired a generation of fashionable English homeowners to install parlor suites featuring chairs, tables and sofas in shapes that evoked the objects depicted on Egyptian tomb paintings.

Later discoveries prompted further revivals, with the discovery of Tutankhamun's tomb creating an especially large revival in the 1920s. This revival in particular had a sizable influence on the Art Deco movement.

== Gallery ==
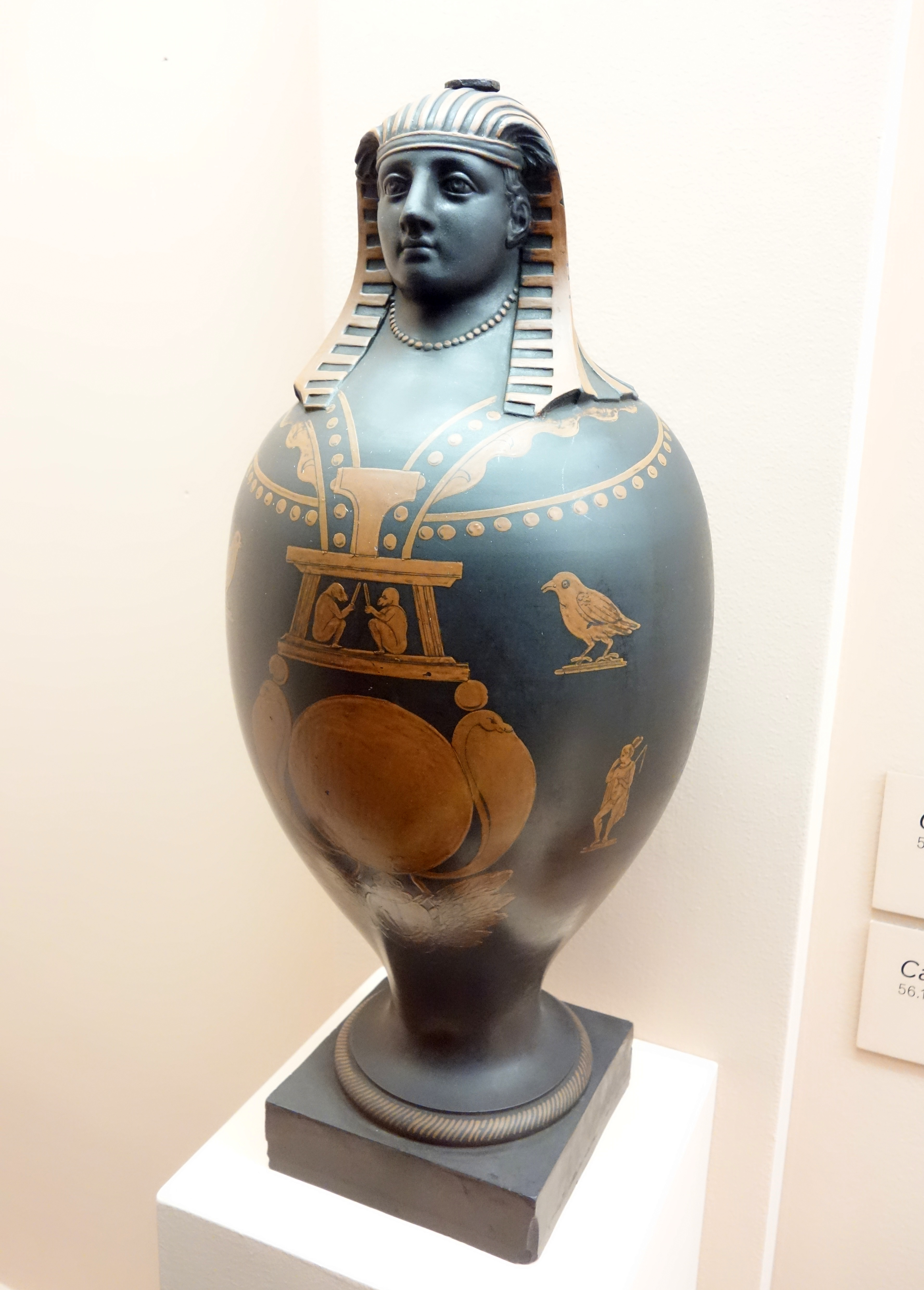
Canopic jar, by Wedgwood, c.1773, earthenware and encaustic, Brooklyn Museum, New York City

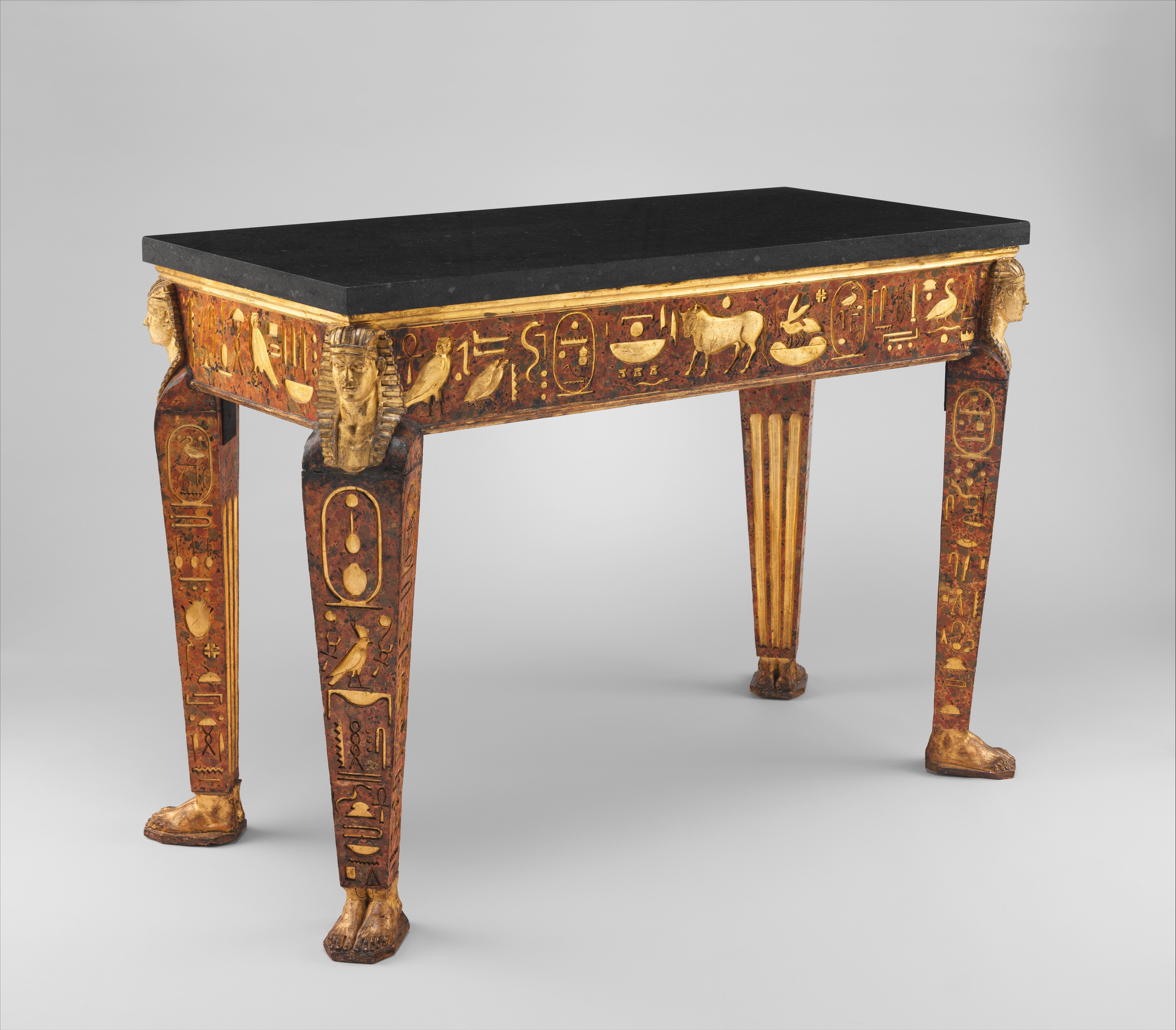
Table, 1775–1780, wood, carved, painted, and partly gilded, and black granite top not original to table, Metropolitan Museum of Art, New York City

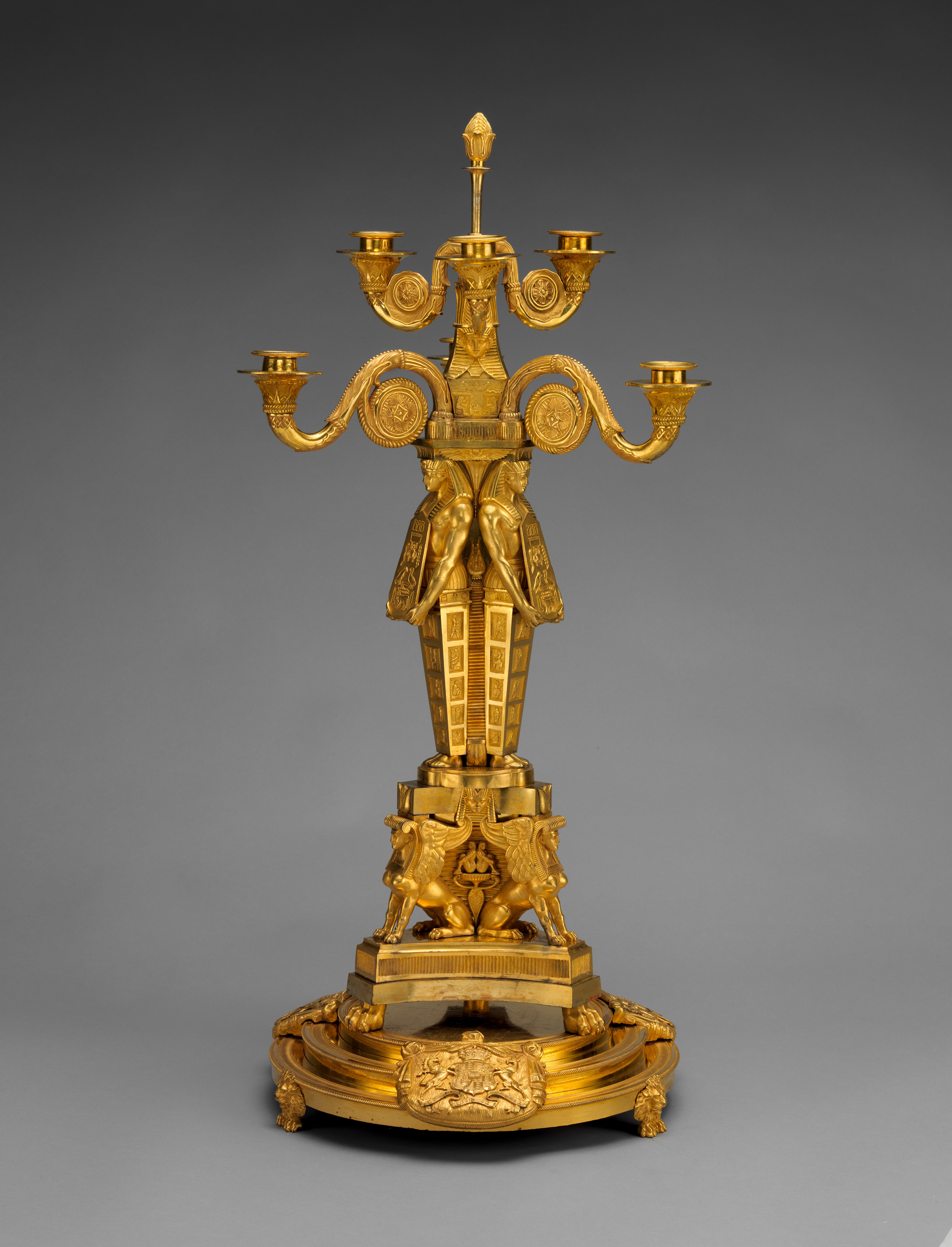
Six-light candelabrums with stands, by Alexis Decaix, 1802–1806, gilt bronze, Metropolitan Museum of Art

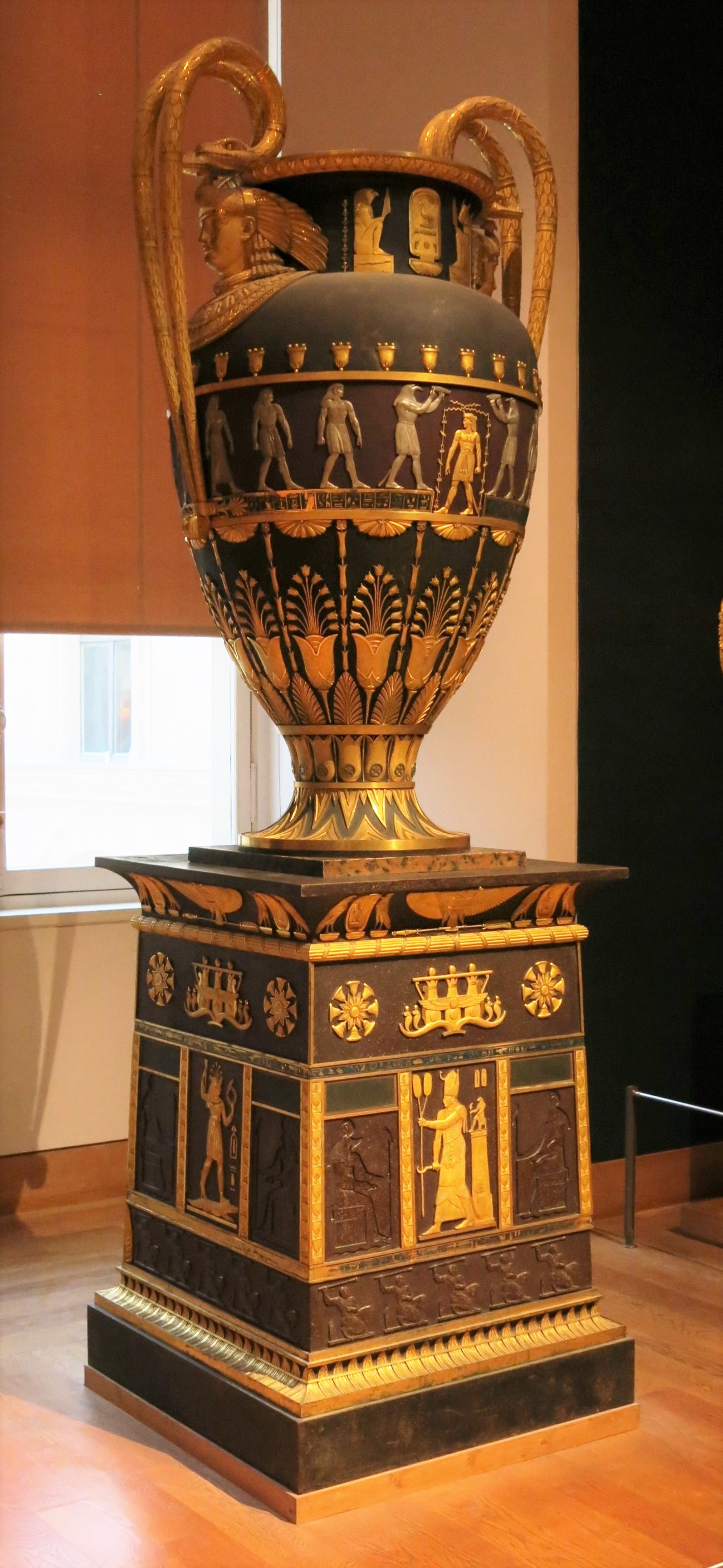
Empire style vase with pedestal, 1804–1806, varnished sheet and gilded bronze, Louvre

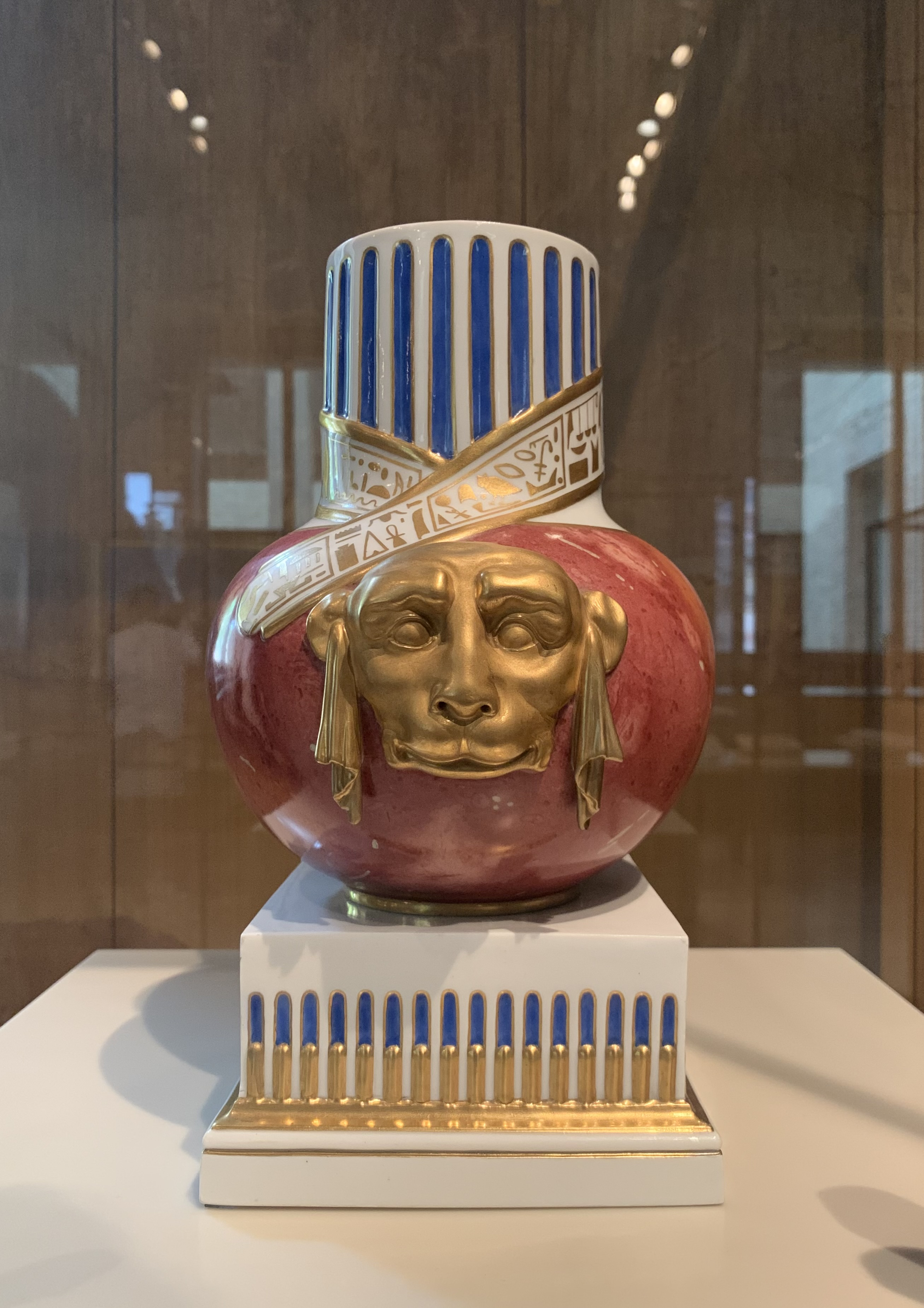
Potpourri vase with pseudo-hieroglyphs, by the Königliche Porzellan-Manufaktur Berlin, c.1810, porcelain (painted & partially gilded), Neues Museum, Berlin

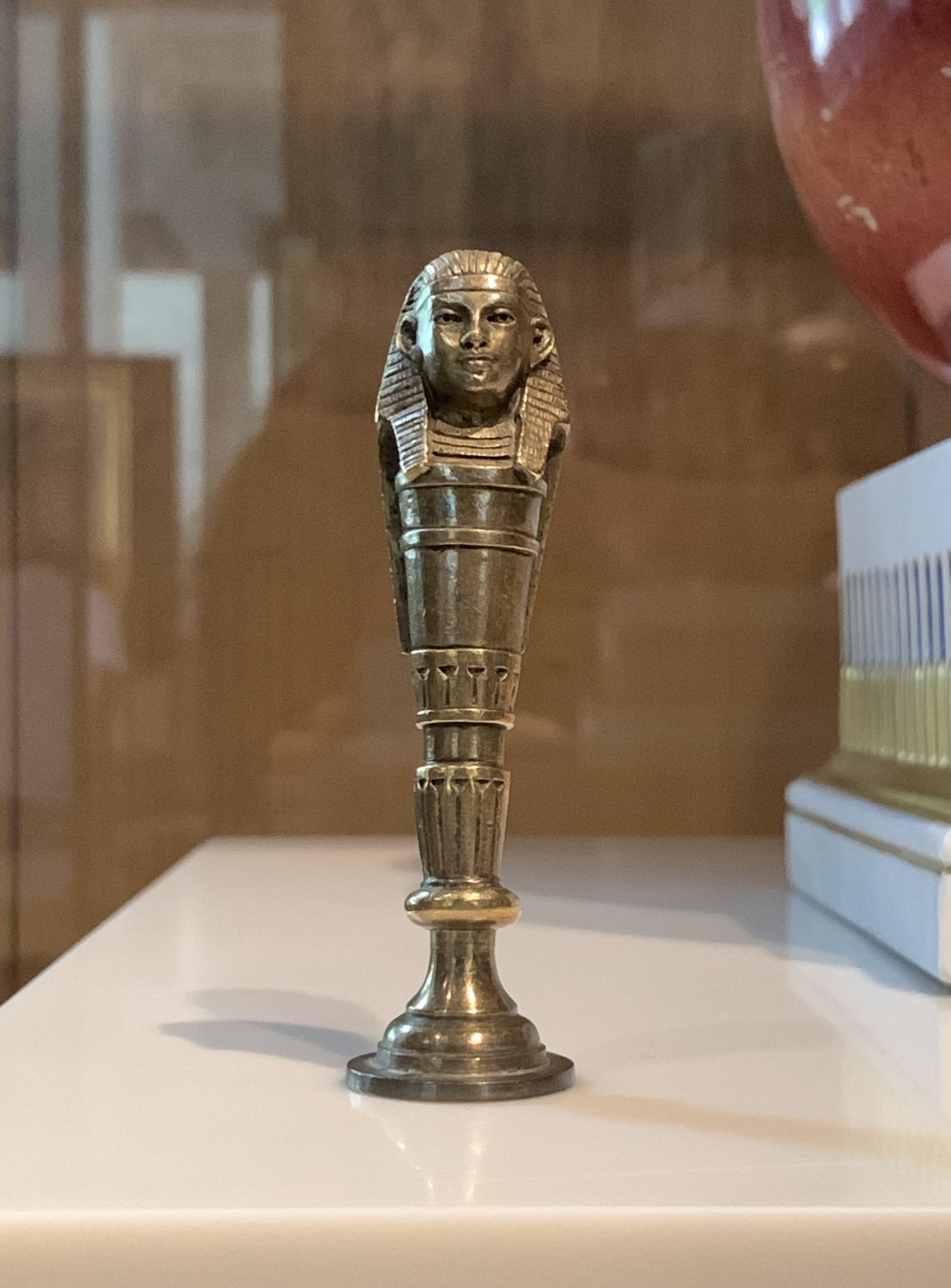
Signet with pharaoh head and Egyptian Revival motifs, c.1810, bronze, Neues Museum

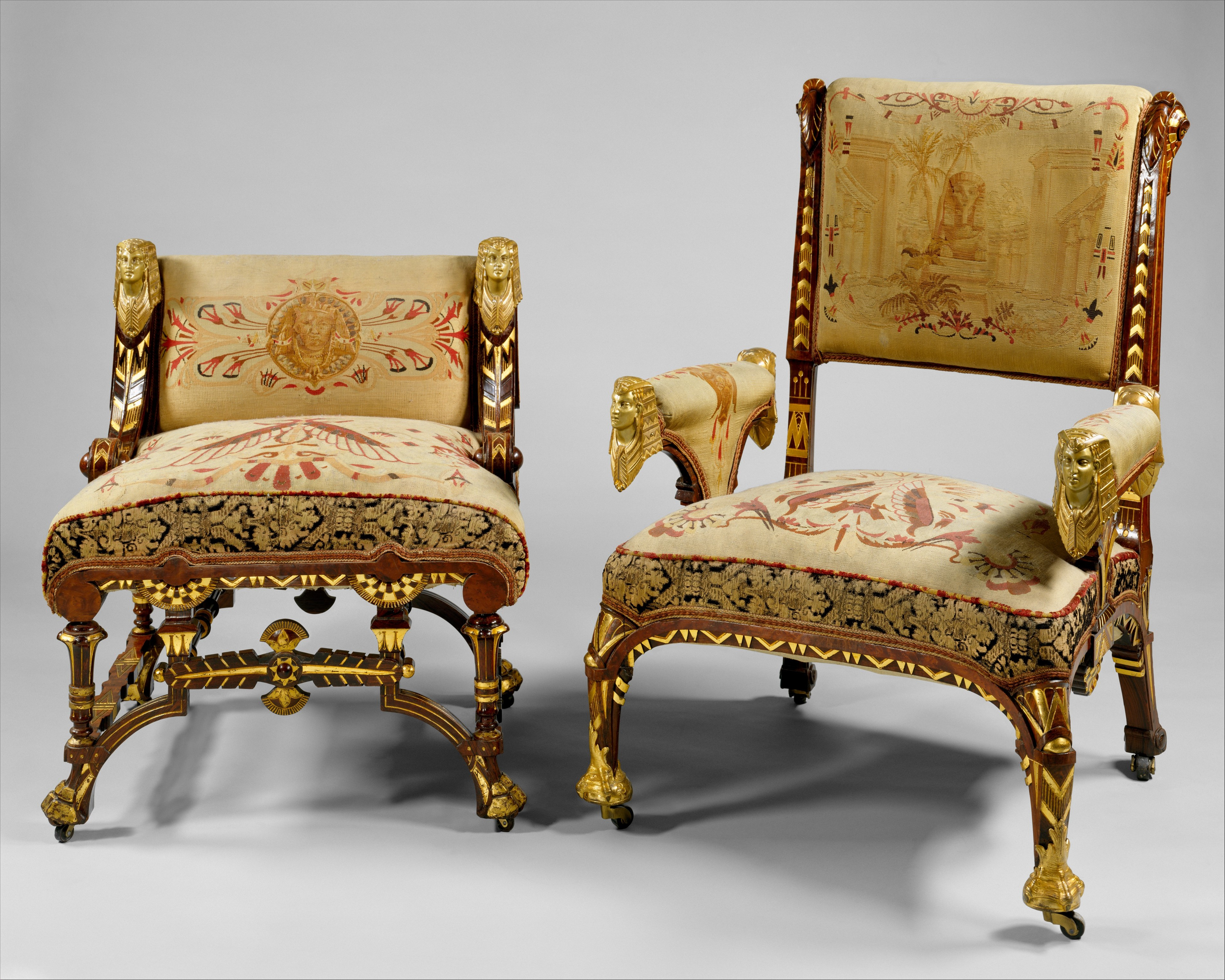
Armchair, 1870–1875, rosewood and prickly juniper veneer, Metropolitan Museum of Art

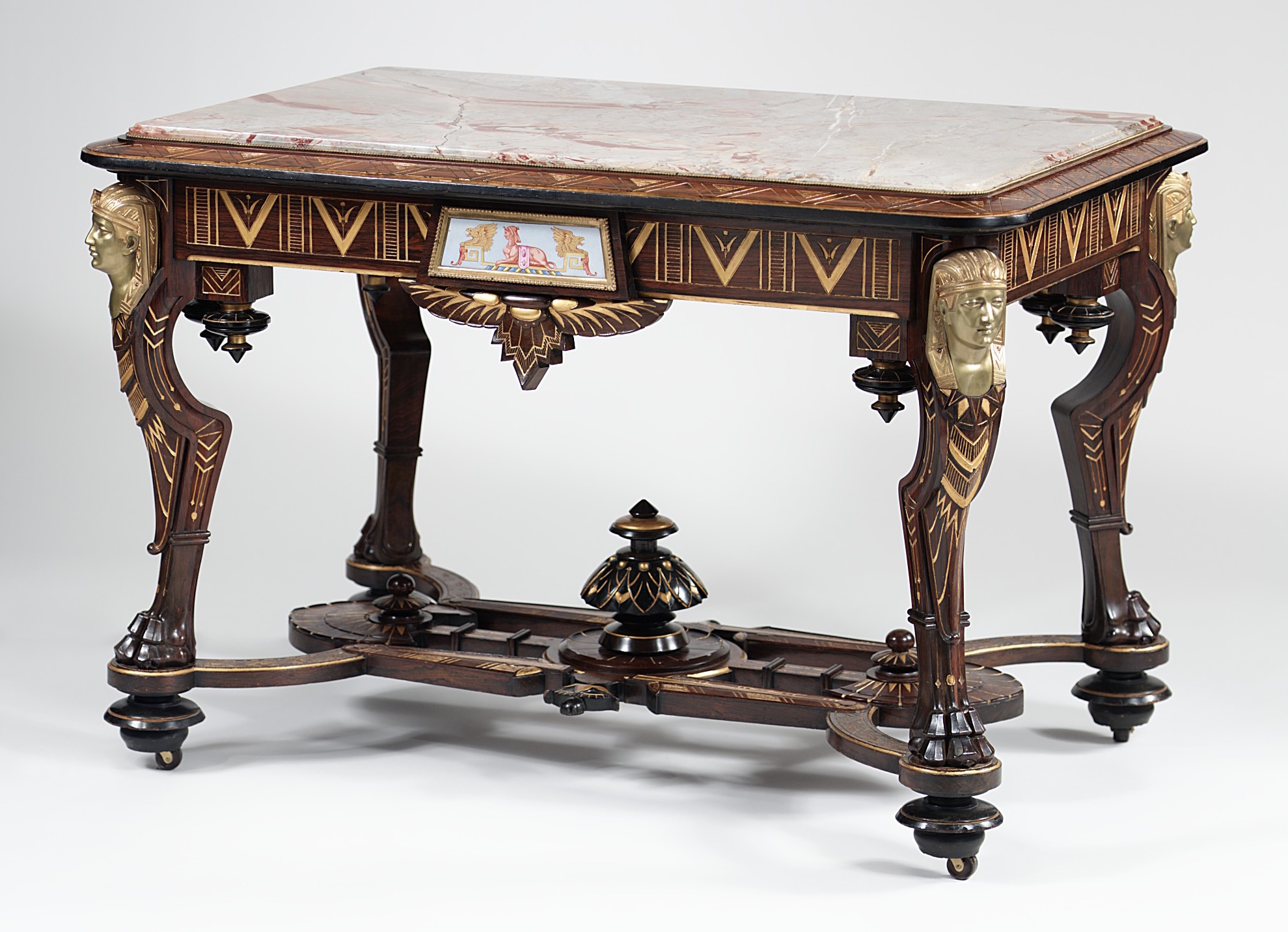
Center table, 1870–1875, rosewood, walnut and marble, Metropolitan Museum of Art

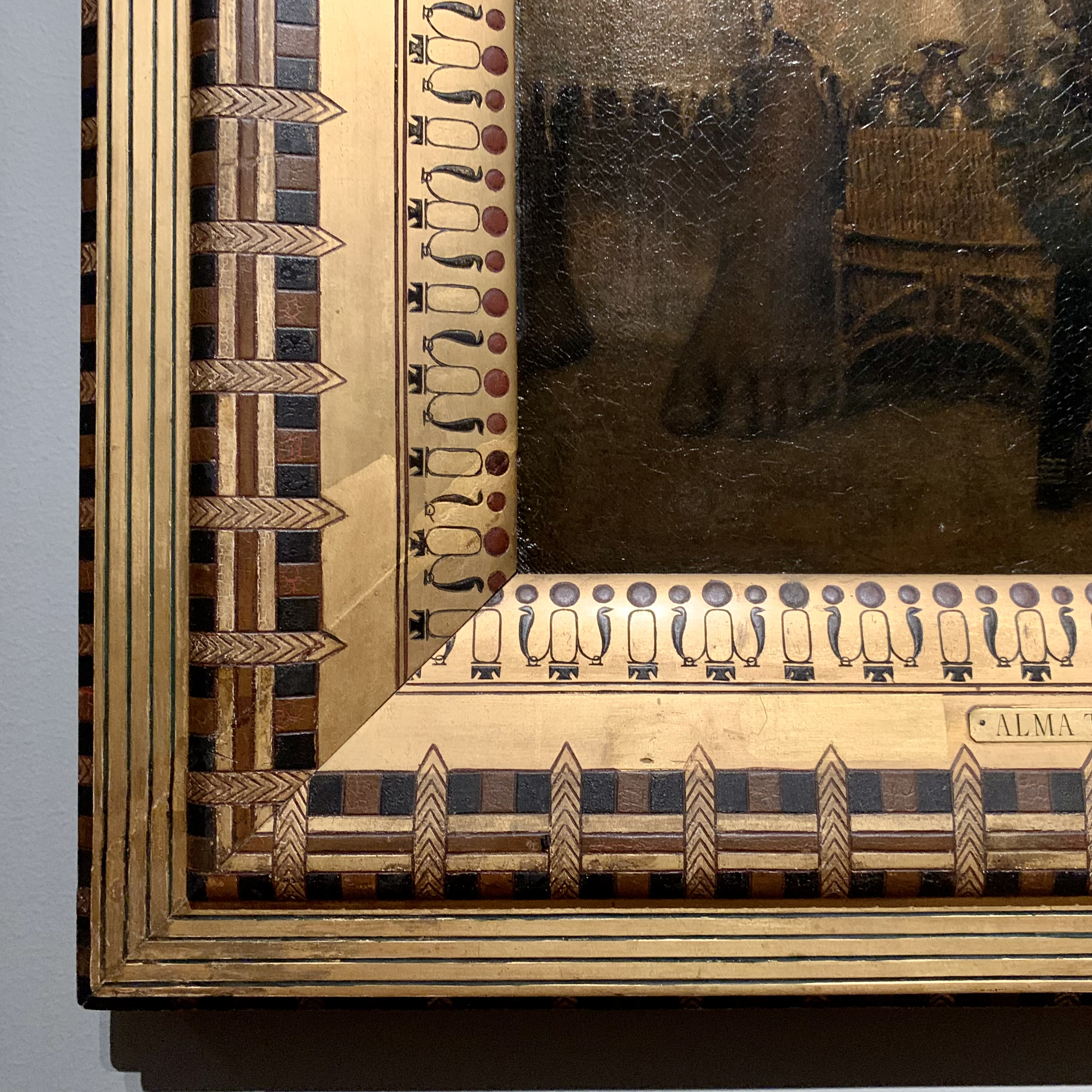
Frame detail of The Death of the Pharaoh's Firstborn Son by Lawrence Alma-Tadema, unknown maker, 1872, painted and gilded wood, Rijksmuseum, Amsterdam, Netherlands

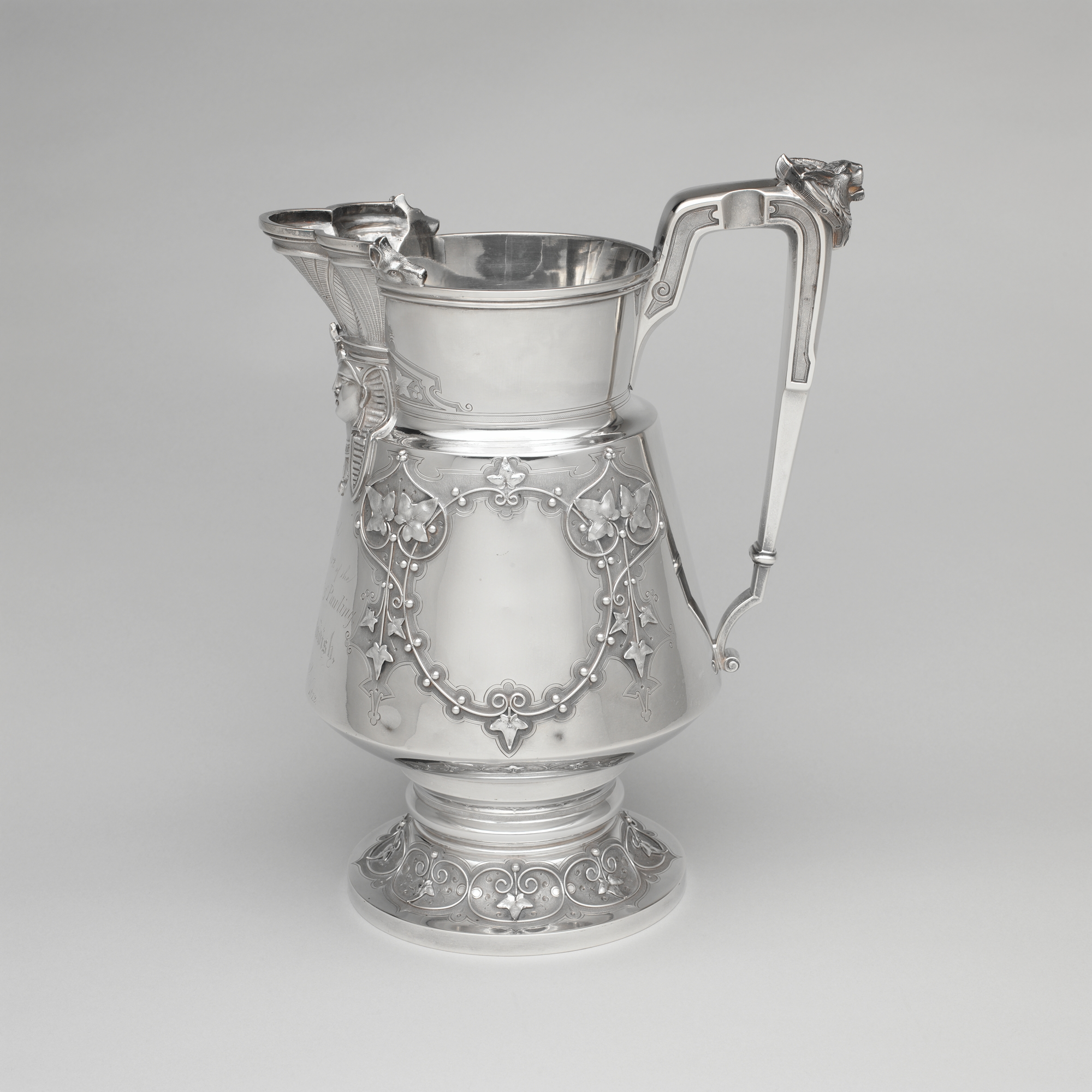
Pitcher, c.1872, silver, Metropolitan Museum of Art

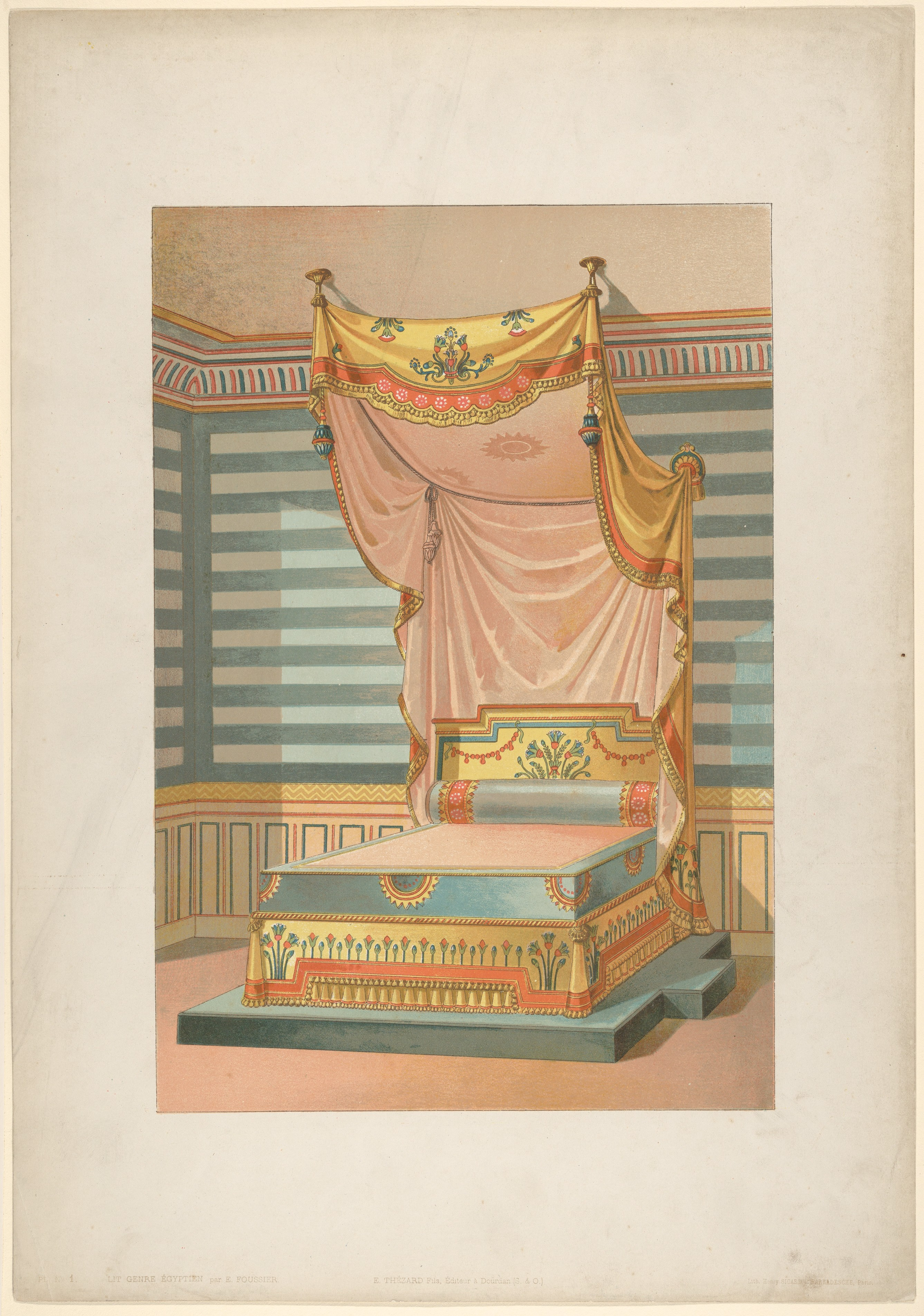
Bed from 'Nouveaux modèles de Tentures (Bibliothèque de l'Ameublement)', 1875–1885, color lithography, Metropolitan Museum of Art

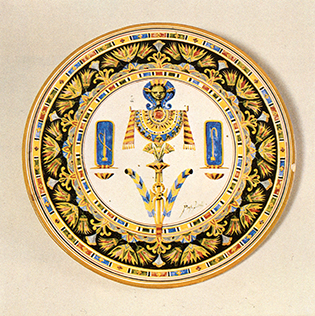
Polychrome majolica design, by Gaetano Lodi, 1885, drawing or painting on paper, unknown location

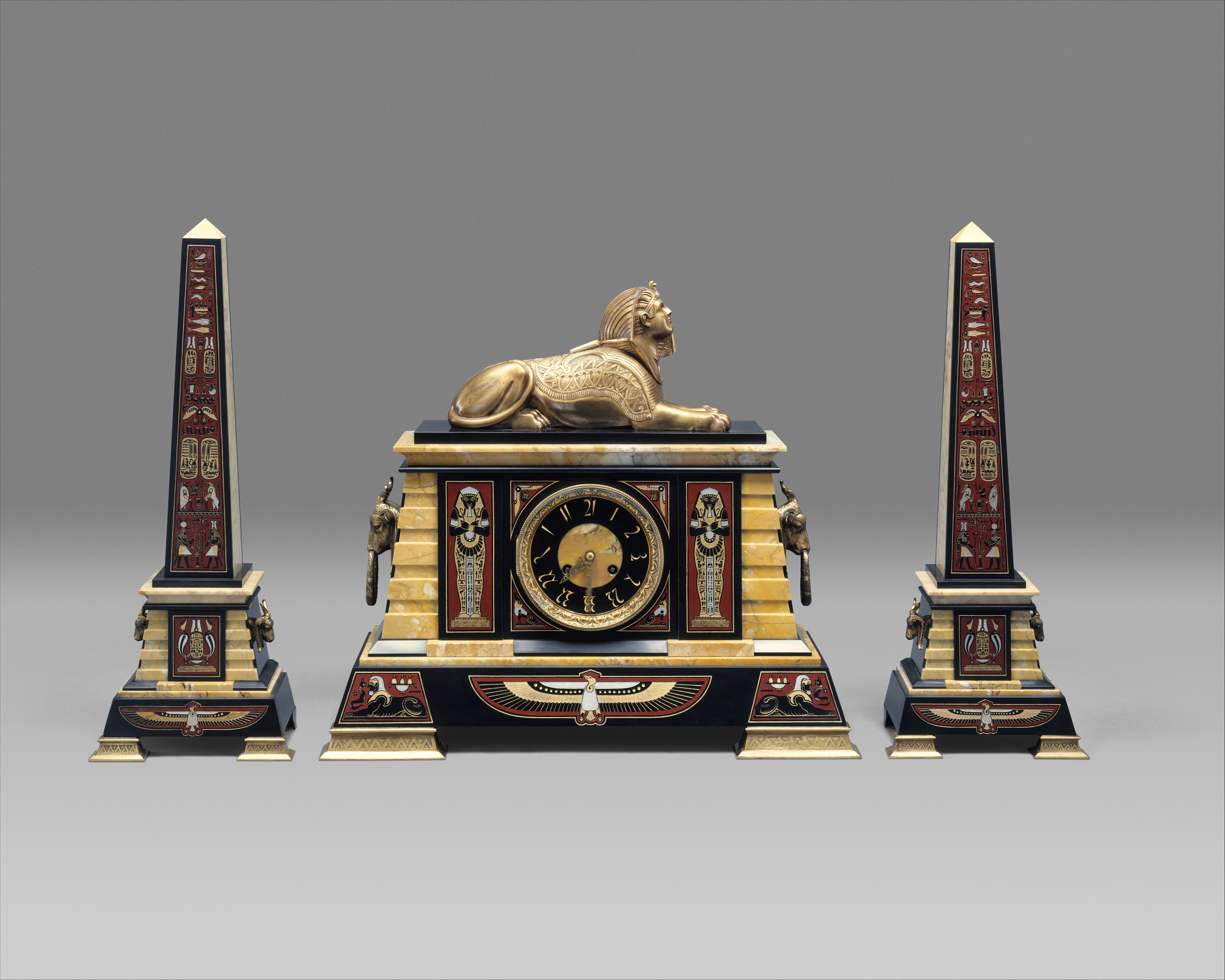
Clock, by Tiffany & Co., c.1885, marble and bronze, Metropolitan Museum of Art

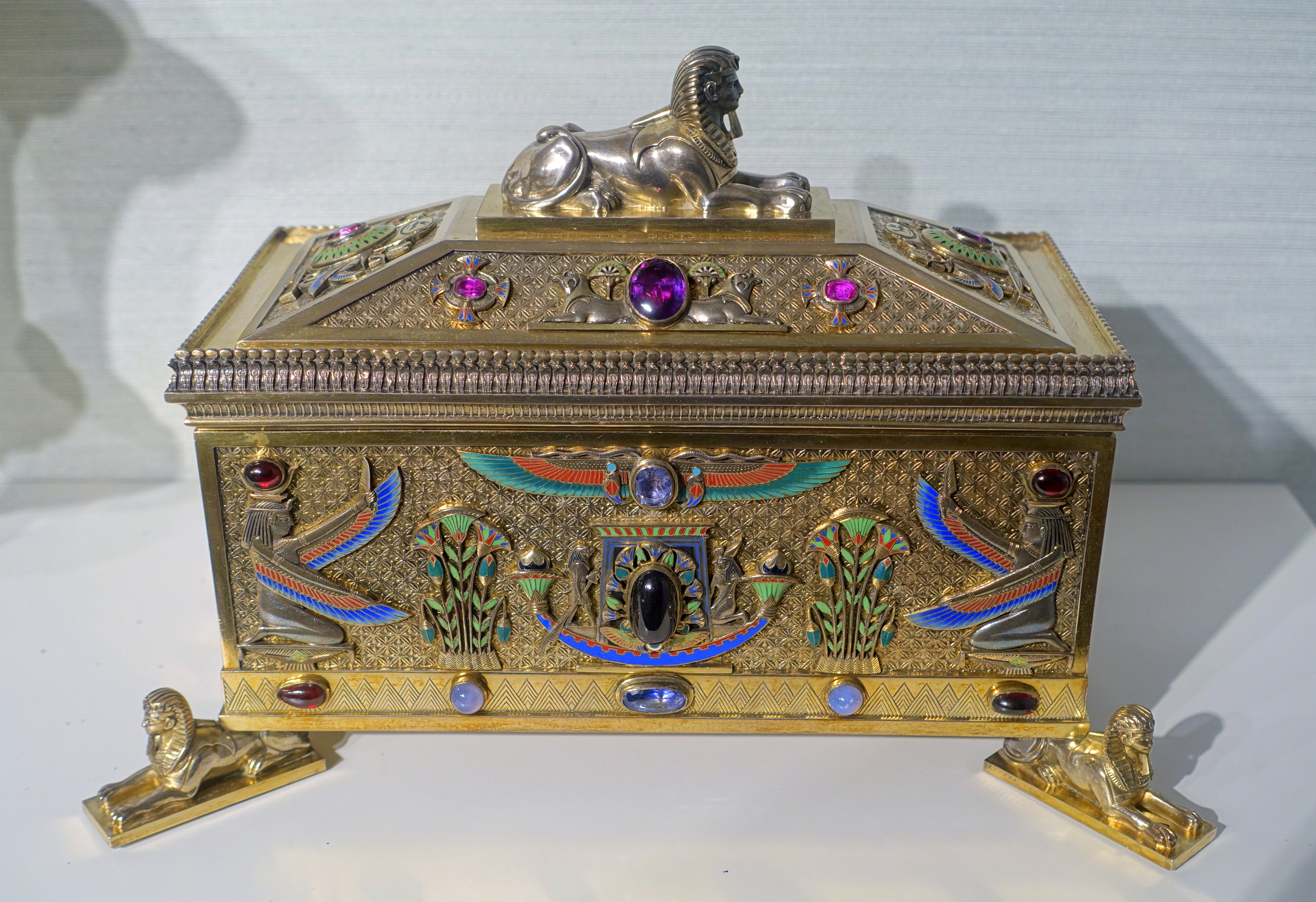
Ceremonial gift for Lord Kitchener, 1898, gilt silver, enamel and gems, Hessisches Landesmuseum Darmstadt, Darmstadt, Germany

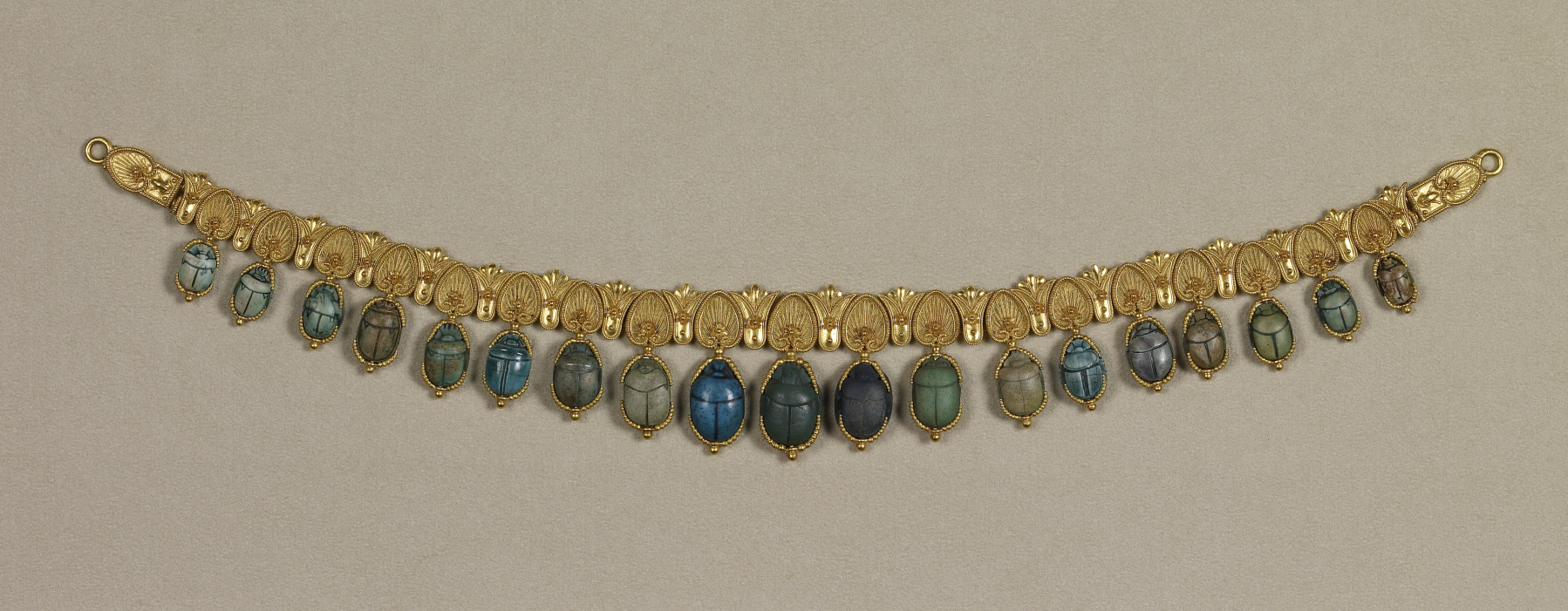
Necklace with scarabs, by Giacinto Melillo, late 19th–early 20th century, gold, steatite and lapis lazuli, Walters Art Museum, Baltimore, USA

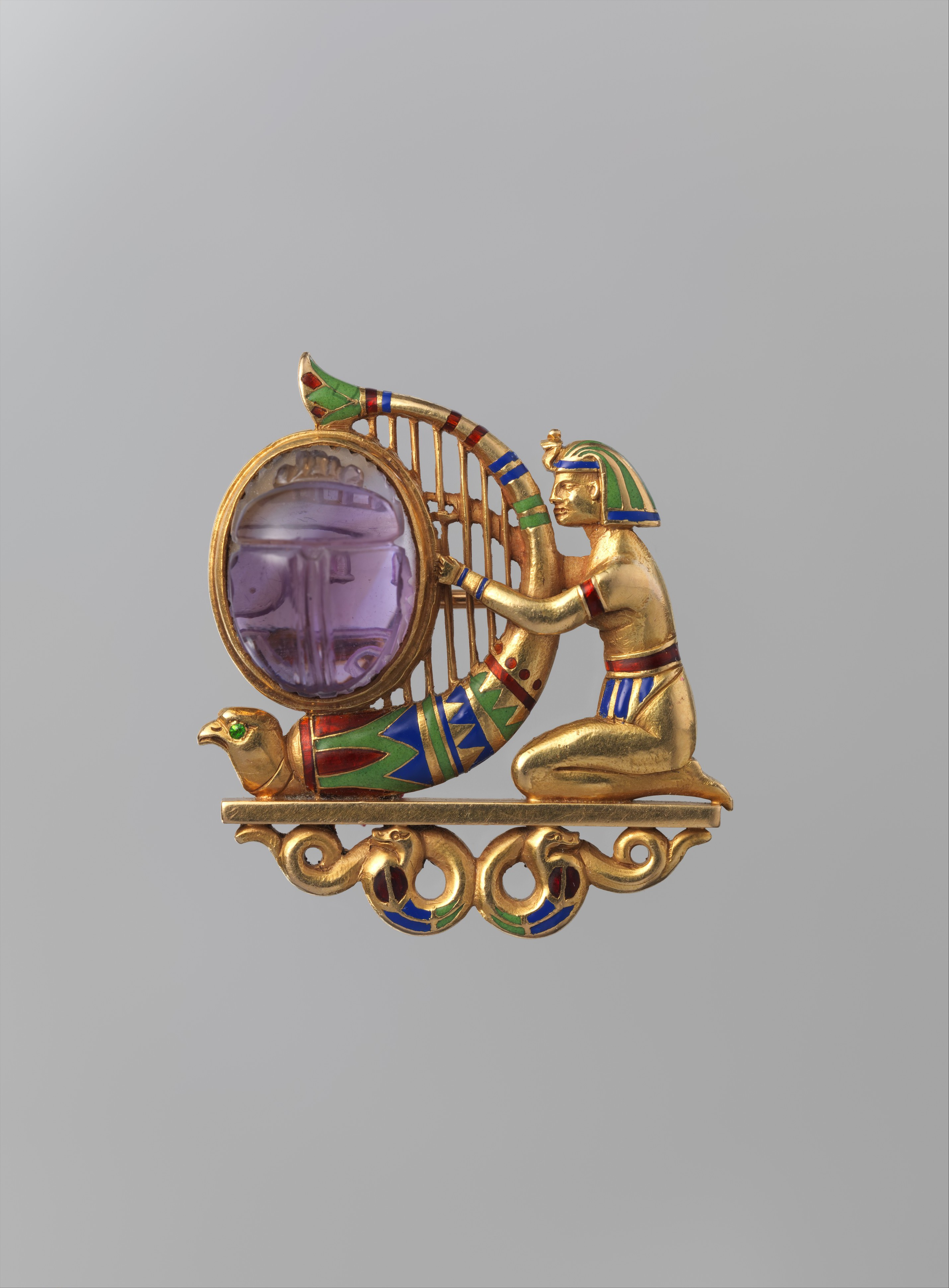
Brooch, c.1900, gold, amethyst, demantoid garnet, and enamel, Metropolitan Museum of Art

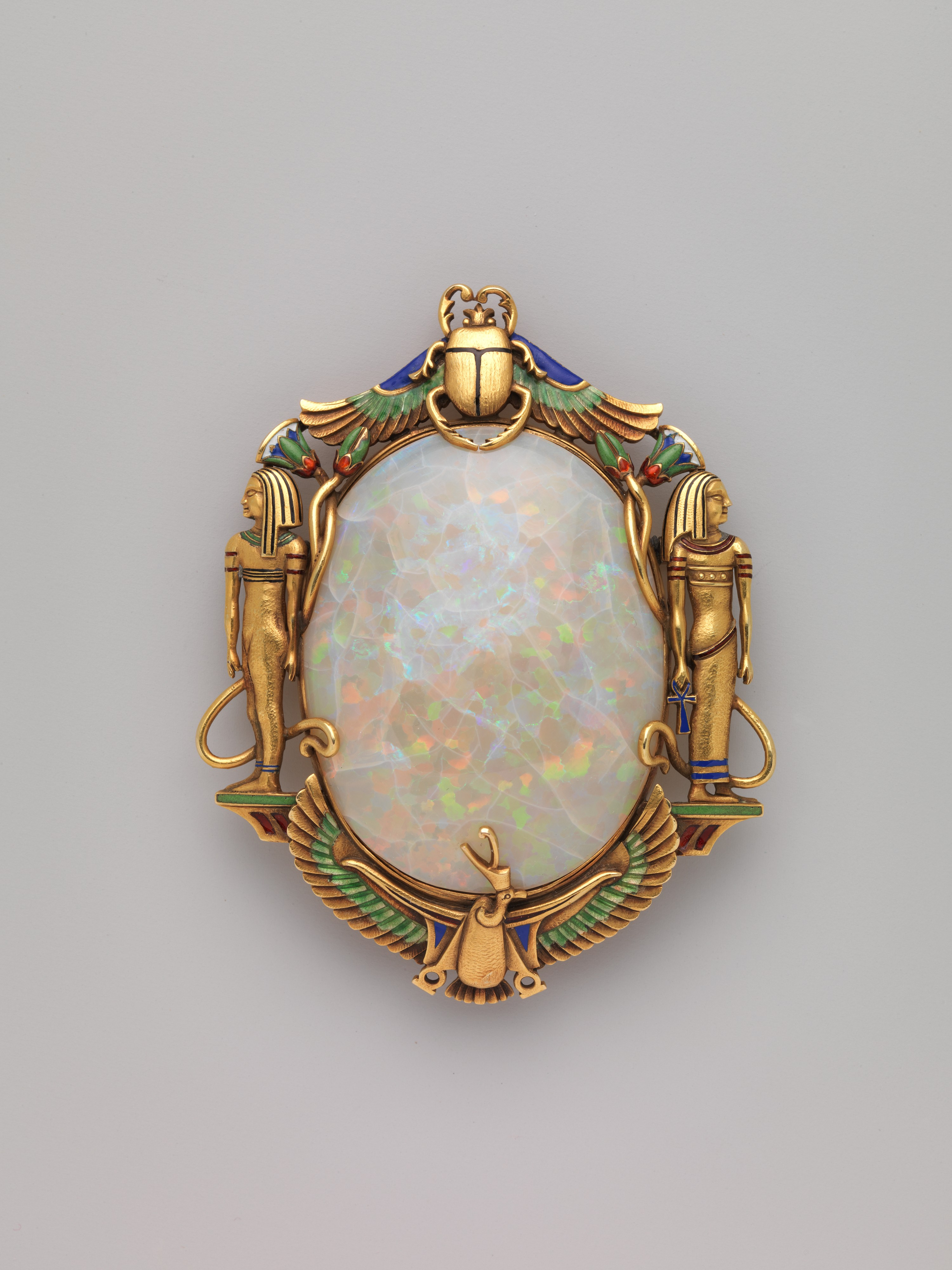
Brooch, by Marcus & Co, c.1900, gold, opal, and enamel, Metropolitan Museum of Art

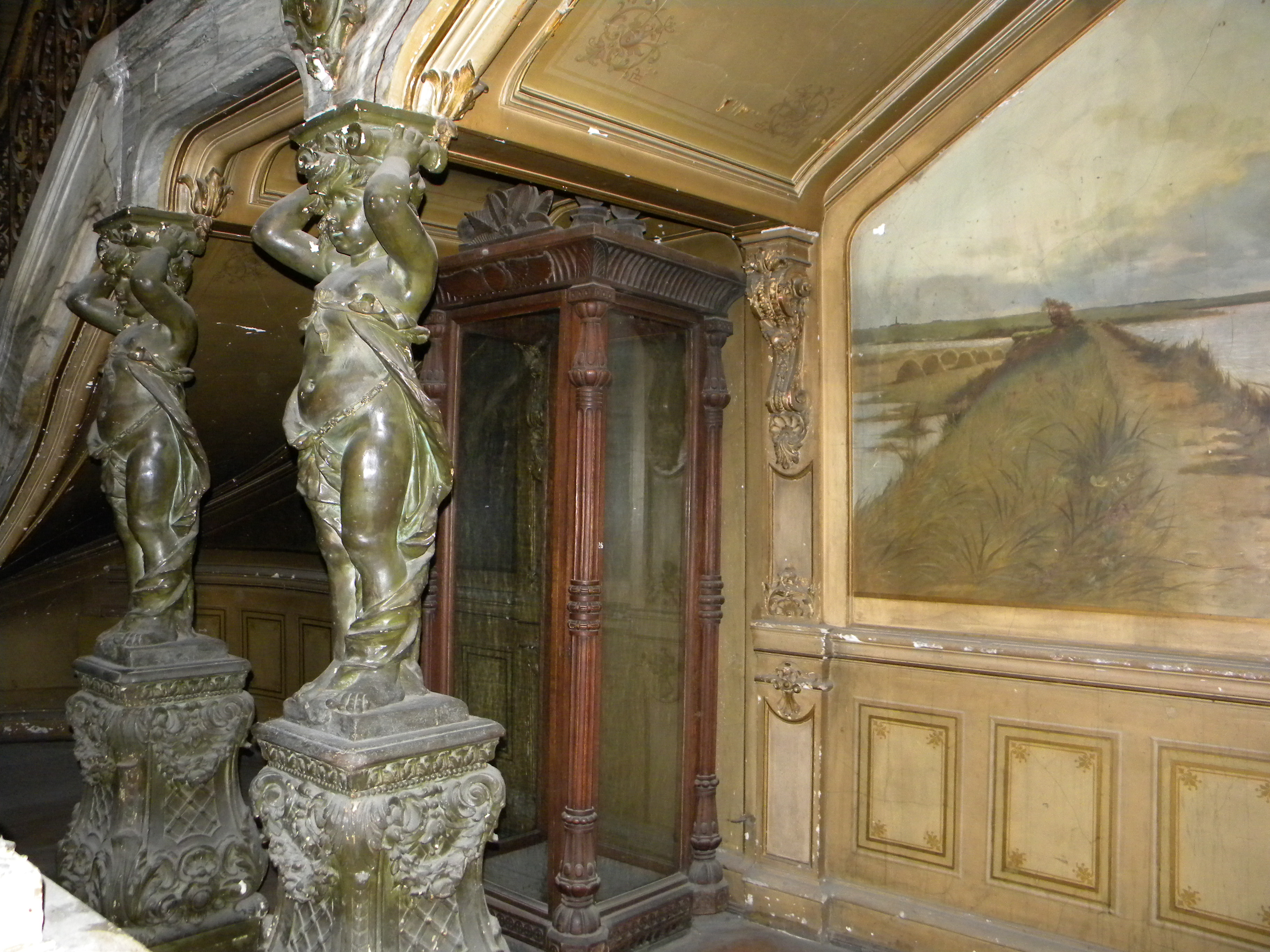
Glass case with lotus columns at each corner, unknown maker, late 19th century, wood and glass, Macca House, Bucharest, Romania

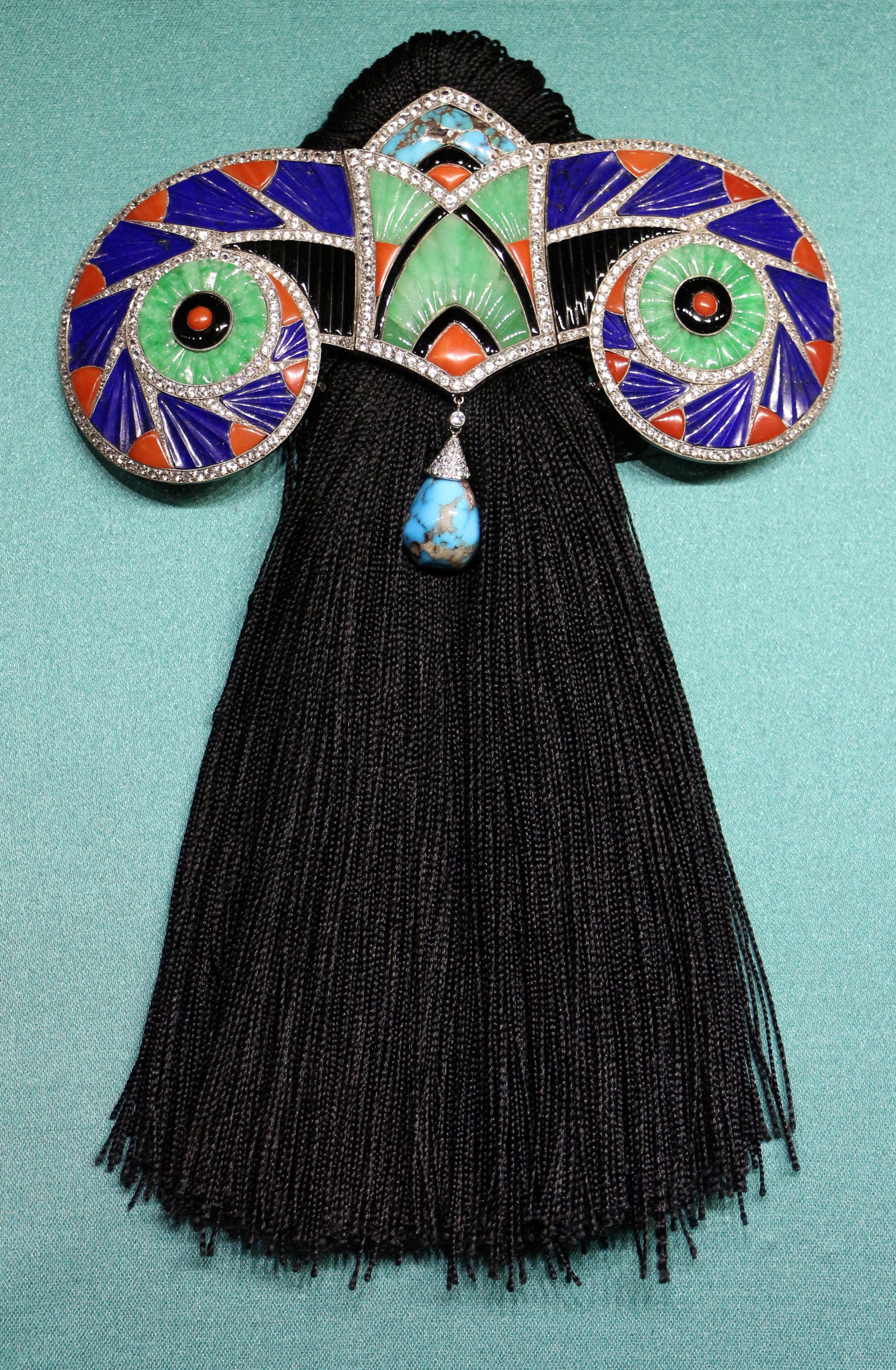
Art Deco stomacher, by Boucheron, 1925, gold, lapis lazuli, coral, jade, onyx, turquoise, rhinestones, unknown location

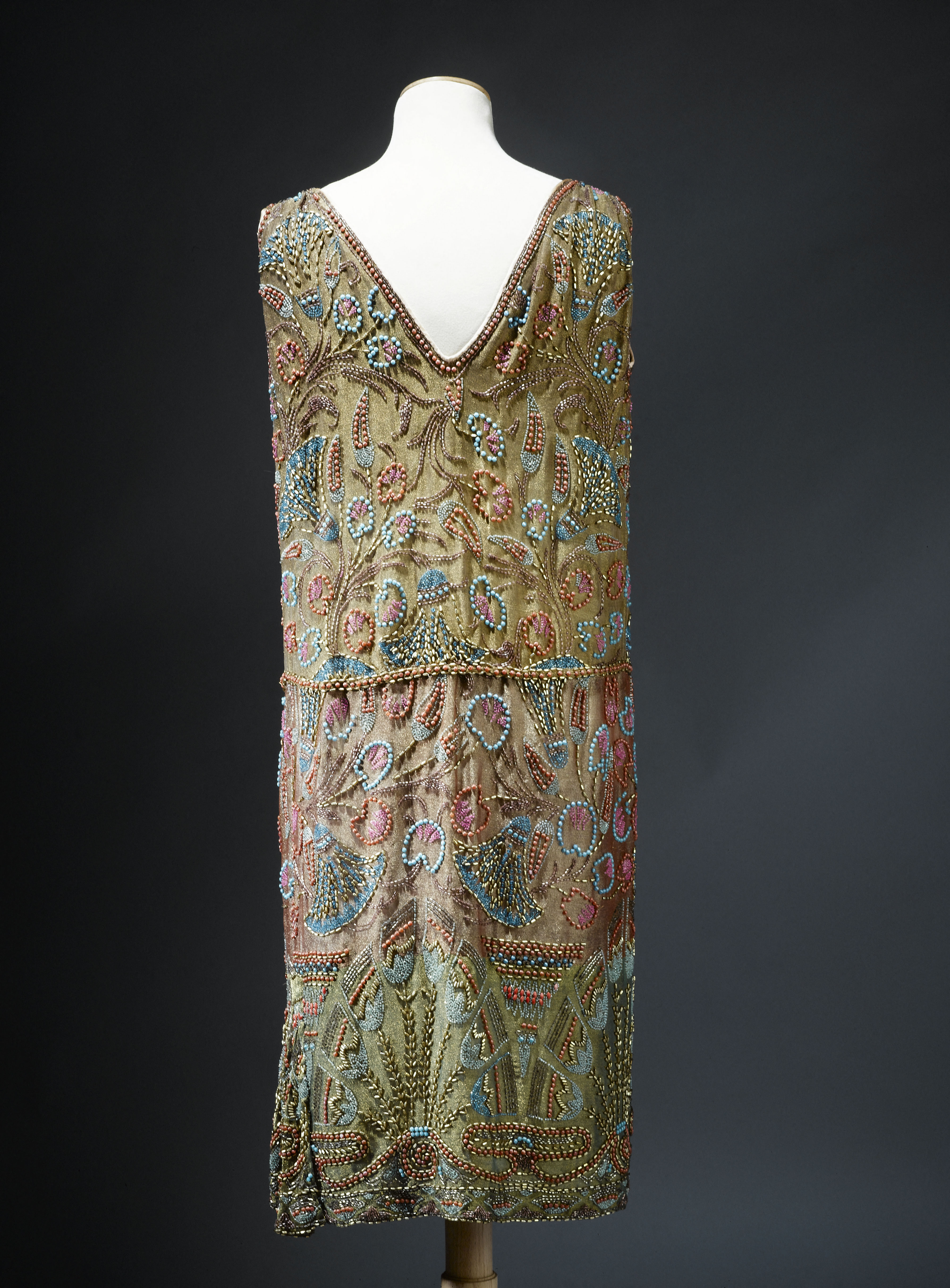
Art Deco dress decorated with lotus flower that are inspired by those found in Ancient Egyptian decoration, by Jenny (couturier) and Lesage (embroiderer), 1926, silk, metallic thread, and crocheted embroidery, Musée Galliera, Paris

== See also ==
- Egyptian Revival architecture
- Art of ancient Egypt
- Orientalism

== Sources ==
- Egyptomania; Egypt in Western Art; 1730–1930, Jean-marcel Humbert, Michael Pantazzi and Christiane Ziegler, 1994
- The Egyptian revival : its sources, monuments, and meaning, 1808–1858, Richard G. Carrott, 1978
- The Egyptian Revival: Ancient Egypt as the Inspiration for Design Motifs in the West, James Stevens Curl, 2005
- Household Furniture and Interior Decoration, Thomas Hope, 1807
