= Macbeth (Verdi) =

Opera by Giuseppe Verdi

- Opera by Giuseppe Verdi
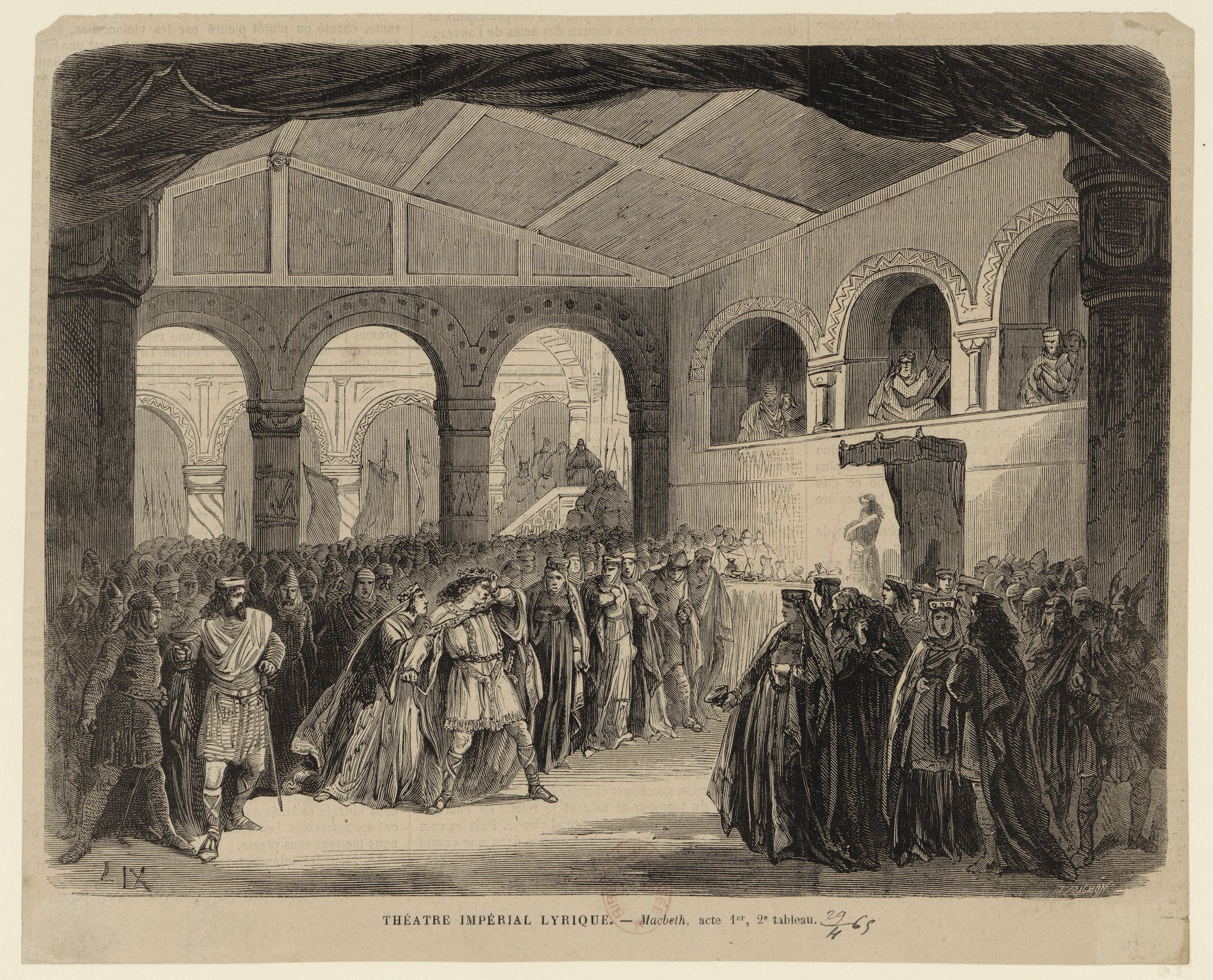
- Illustration by Frédéric Lix of the 1865 version's première
- Librettist: Francesco Maria Piave; Andrea Maffei
- Language: Italian (1847); French (1865)
- Based on: Shakespeare's play Macbeth
- Premiere: 14 March 1847 (Italian); 21 April 1865 (French); Teatro della Pergola, Florence (Italian); Théâtre Lyrique, Paris (French)

Macbeth (Italian pronunciation: [ˈmakbet], also [makˈbɛt]) is an opera in four acts by Giuseppe Verdi, with an Italian libretto by Francesco Maria Piave and additions by Andrea Maffei, based on William Shakespeare's play of the same name. Written for the Teatro della Pergola in Florence, Macbeth was Verdi's tenth opera and premiered on 14 March 1847. It was the first Shakespeare play that Verdi adapted for the operatic stage. Almost twenty years later, Macbeth was revised and expanded into a French version and given in Paris on 21 April 1865.

After the success of Attila in 1846, by which time the composer had become well established, Macbeth came before the great successes of 1851 to 1853 (Rigoletto, Il trovatore and La traviata) which propelled him into universal fame. As sources, Shakespeare's plays provided Verdi with lifelong inspiration: some, such as an adaption of King Lear (as Re Lear) were never realized, but he wrote his two final operas using Othello as the basis for Otello (1887) and The Merry Wives of Windsor as the basis for Falstaff (1893).

The first version of Macbeth was completed during the time that Verdi described as his "galley years," which ranged over 16 years and saw the composer produce 22 operas. By the standards of the subject matter of almost all Italian operas produced during the first fifty years of the 19th century, Macbeth was highly unusual. The 1847 version was very successful, and it was presented widely. The 1865 revision, produced in a French translation and with several additions, was first given on 21 April. It was less successful, and the opera largely faded from public view until the mid-20th century revivals.

== Composition history ==
=== Original 1847 version ===
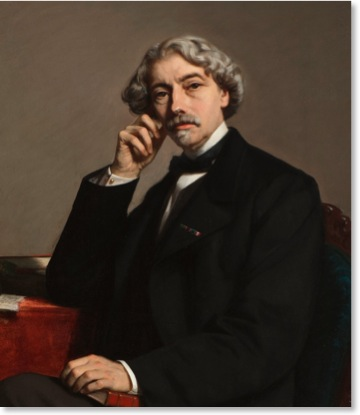
Andrea Maffei, 1862

Influenced by his friendship in the 1840s with Andrea Maffei, a poet and man of letters who had suggested both Schiller's Die Räuber (The Robbers) and Shakespeare's play Macbeth as suitable subjects for operas, Giuseppe Verdi received a commission from Florence's Teatro della Pergola, but no particular opera was specified. He only started working on Macbeth in September 1846; the reason for that choice was the availability of a particular singer, the baritone Felice Varesi who would sing the title role. With Varesi under contract, Verdi could focus on the music for Macbeth. (Maffei was already writing a libretto for I masnadieri, which was based on the suggested Schiller play, but it could have been substituted for Macbeth had the baritone not been available.) As a result of various complications, including Verdi's illness, that work was not to receive its premiere until July 1847.

Piave's text was based on a prose translation by Carlo Rusconi that had been published in Turin in 1838. Verdi did not encounter Shakespeare's original work until after the opera's first performance. However, he had read Shakespeare in translation for many years, as noted in an 1865 letter: "He is one of my favorite poets. I have had him in my hands from my earliest youth".

Writing to Piave, Verdi made it clear how important this subject was to him: "....This tragedy is one of the greatest creations of man... If we can't make something great out of it, let us at least try to do something out of the ordinary." Despite disagreements and Verdi's need to constantly bully Piave into correcting his drafts (to the point where Maffei had a hand in re-writing some scenes of the libretto, especially the witches' chorus in Act 3 and the sleepwalking scene), their version follows Shakespeare's play quite closely, but with some changes. Instead of using three witches as in the play, there is a large female chorus of witches, singing in three-part harmony (they are divided in three groups, and every group sings as a single witch, using "I" and not "we"). The last act begins with an assembly of refugees on the English border and, in the revised version, ends with a chorus of bards celebrating victory over the tyrant.

=== 1865 revised version for Paris ===
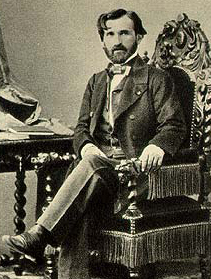
Verdi in 1859

As early as 1852, Verdi was requested to revise his Macbeth for Paris. At first, nothing transpired, but in 1864 Verdi was asked again to provide additional music – a ballet and a final chorus – for a production planned at the Théâtre Lyrique (Théâtre-Lyrique Impérial du Châtelet) in Paris. In a letter to his publisher, Giulio Ricordi, asking for a copy of the score, Verdi stated, "I would like to lengthen several pieces to give the opera more character." Still, he quickly realized that the proposed additions would not be sufficient and that an overhaul of the opera was required. He went ahead to advise the impresario of the Lyrique, Léon Carvalho, that more time was needed and urged patience: "I am labouring, labouring, labouring" he assured the impresario and stressed that he wanted to look at the big picture and not try to hurry along a re-working of an opera he had written so many years before.

So began a revising the original version of 1847 over the winter of 1864/65. Verdi's librettist from years before, Francesco Maria Piave, was pressed into service to expand the opera. The composer exerted his usual pressures on him as he had done from their first collaboration: "No, no, my dear Piave, it won't do!" was a typical reaction to a first draft—in this case, it was of Lady Macbeth's new act 2 aria "La luce langue," the result of which (notes biographer Mary Jane Phillips-Matz) was "from Verdi's insistence came Lady Macbeth's gripping scene." With the addition of music for Lady Macbeth, Macbeth's aria in Act 3 was completely re-written—as was a considerable amount of the rest of Act 3; a ballet was added in Act 3; a newly composed chorus to an old text began Act 4; and the ending of Act 4 was also changed, Verdi, being determined to drop Macbeth's final aria Mal per me che m'affidai ("Trusting in the prophecies of Hell") in favor of an off-stage death, to end with the triumphal chorus.

As if all these specific demands placed on Piave were not enough, Verdi wrote a lengthy letter to Ricordi outlining what he saw as the dramatic demands of the revision. Some relate to crucial elements in the drama, especially how Banquo's appearance as a ghost should be presented. Ultimately however, Verdi had little power over the staged production, but— regarding the translation—he did insist that the translator, when considering the Act 2 duet between the Macbeth couple, retain the words "Folie follie" as written to emphasize the dramatic impact which those words created.

One final letter, this time in February to Escudier, relates to what Verdi saw as "the three roles in this opera, and there can only be three". He then lays out that there is "Lady Macbet, (sic) Macbet, (sic) [and the] Chorus of Witches," discounting the role of Macduff, and he continues by noting that, for him, "the Witches rule the drama.....They are truly a character and a character of greatest importance."

The new version was first performed on 21 April 1865 in a French translation by Charles-Louis-Étienne Nuitter and Alexandre Beaumont. However, Verdi had asked for it to be done by Gilbert Duprez, the tenor-turned-teacher in whom he had great confidence and whom he knew from his performances in his first opera for Paris, Jérusalem, in 1847. The composer refused to attend the Paris performance but provided directions via his publisher, others directly to Escudier. Initially, the reports from Escudier were favorable. Still, the first performance was poorly received by the critics, something which puzzled the composer: "I thought I had done quite well with it...it appears I was mistaken" he stated when he wrote to his Paris publisher, Escudier. Later performances in Paris fared no better.

In Italian, the opera was given at La Scala in the autumn of 1865, but few, if any, others in Italy appear to have been presented. Since its revival in Europe in the 1960s, the revised version of Macbeth in Italian remains the preferred version for modern performances, although occasionally the death scene from the first version is interpolated in the last scene.

== Performance history ==
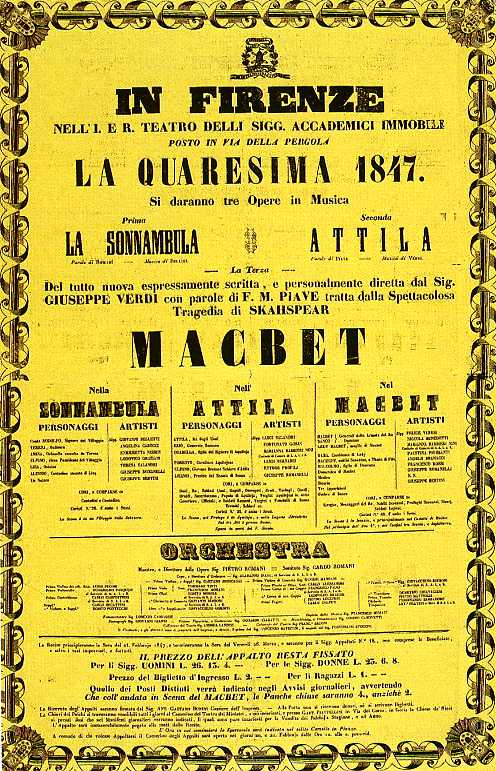
Poster for the premiere of Verdi's Macbeth

=== 19th century ===
The 1847 version, after it was first given on 14 March of that year in Florence, was successful and was performed all over Italy in some 21 locations (some repeated) until the revised version appeared in 1865. At that time it was recorded that it was given only in Turin (1867), Vicenza (1869), Firenze (1870), and Milan (1874).

The first version was given its United States premiere in April 1850 at Niblo's Garden in New York with Angiolina Bosio as Lady Macbeth and Cesare Badiali as Banco, while the United Kingdom premiere took place in October 1860 in Manchester.

After the 1865 premiere of the revised version, followed by only 13 more performances, the opera generally fell from popularity. It was given in Paris in April 1865 and then occasionally up to about 1900. However, after that, it was rarely performed until after World War II.

=== 20th century and beyond ===
The US premiere of the later version did not occur until 24 October 1941 in New York when it was staged by the New Opera Company at Broadway's 44th Street Theatre with conductor Fritz Busch. The cast included Jess Walters in the title role, Florence Kirk as Lady Macbeth, Robert Silva as Banquo, Robert Marshall as Macduff, John Hamill as Malcolm, Martha Lipton as the Lady-in-waiting, and Leon Lishner as the Doctor.

However, two European productions, in Berlin in the 1930s and at Glyndebourne in 1938 and 1939, were important in helping the 20th-century revival. The 1938 production was the UK premiere of the revised version and the first to combine the death of Macbeth from the 1847 version with the triumphal ending from the 1865 version, something totally against Verdi's wishes.

Glyndebourne revived it in the 1950s, as did Teatro alla Scala in 1952 with Maria Callas as Lady Macbeth, but it was not until 1959 that it appeared on the Metropolitan Opera's roster for the first time and has often been performed there since then. The Opera Guild of Montreal presented the Canadian premiere of Macbeth in January 1959, beating the Metropolitan Opera by two weeks. Similarly, the first presentations at the Royal Opera House, Covent Garden, with Tito Gobbi (and others in the title role) took place on 30 March 1960, with other productions presented in 1981 and 2002. The visiting "Kirov Opera" (as today's Mariinsky Opera was then known) presented it in London at Covent Garden in 2001.

In recent times, the opera has appeared more frequently in the repertories of companies such as the Washington National Opera (2007) and the San Francisco Opera (Nov/Dec 2007) and in many other opera houses worldwide, but almost all productions stage the revised version in Italian.

However, the 1847 version was given in concert at the Royal Opera House on 27 June 1997, and both the original and the revised versions were presented in 2003 as part of the Sarasota Opera's "Verdi Cycle" of all the composer's operas in their different versions.

In 2012, the Grand Théâtre de Genève presented a production of the opera under the direction of Christof Loy.

Today, Verdi's Macbeth receives many performances at opera houses worldwide.

== Roles ==
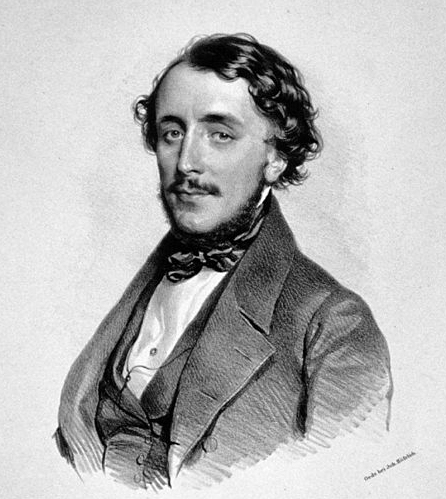
Felice Varesi, the first Macbeth (Litho by Josef Kriehuber, 1843)

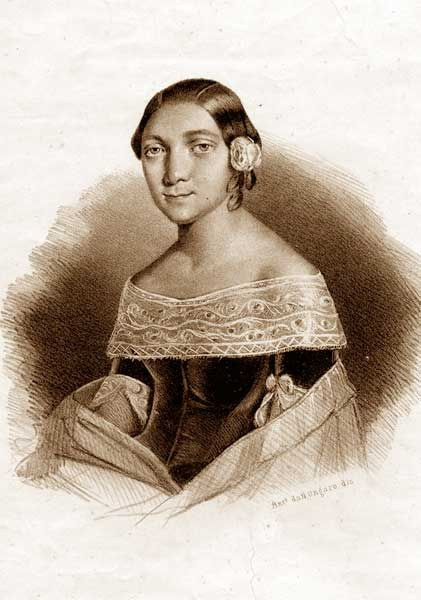
Marianna Barbieri-Nini, the first Lady Macbeth

| Role | Voice type | Premiere cast, 14 March 1847 Conductor: Giuseppe Verdi | Revised version, in French Premiere cast, 21 April 1865 Conductor: Adolphe Deloffre |
|---|---|---|---|
| Macbeth (always called "Macbetto" in the libretto) | baritone | Felice Varesi | Jean-Vital Jammes (Ismaël) |
| Lady Macbeth | soprano or mezzo-soprano | Marianna Barbieri-Nini | Amélie Rey-Balla |
| Banco (Banquo) | bass | Nicola Benedetti | Jules-Émile Petit |
| Macduff | tenor | Angelo Brunacci | Jules-Sébastien Monjauze |
| Lady-in-waiting | mezzo-soprano | Faustina Piombanti | Mairot |
| Malcolm | tenor | Francesco Rossi | Auguste Huet |
| Doctor | bass | Giuseppe Romanelli | Prosper Guyot |
| Servant to Macbeth | bass | Giuseppe Romanelli | Péront |
| Herald | bass | Giuseppe Bertini | Gilland |
| Assassin | bass | Giuseppe Bertini | Caillot |
| Three apparitions | 2 sopranos and 1 bass | | |
| Duncano (Duncan), King of Scotland | Silent | | |
| Fleanzio (Fleance), son of Banco | Silent | | |
Witches, messengers, nobles, attendants, refugees – chorus

== Synopsis ==
Note: there are several differences between the 1847 and the 1865 versions which are noted below in text in indented brackets

Place: Scotland
Time: 11th century

=== Act 1 ===
Scene 1: A heath

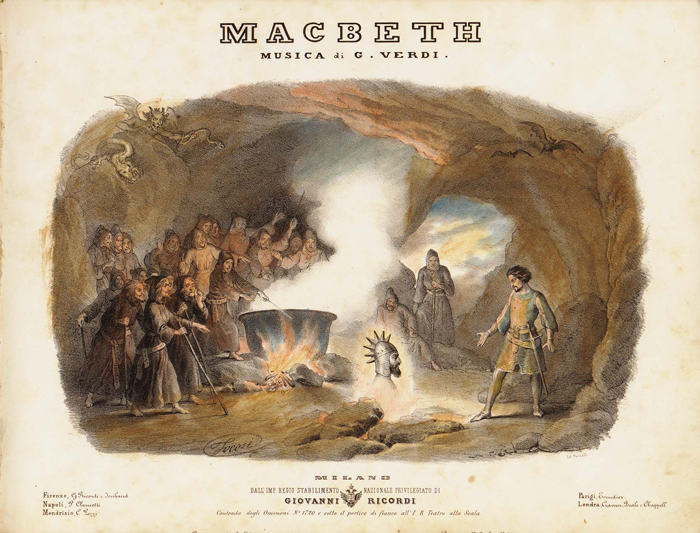
Macbeth meets the witches

Groups of witches gather in a wood beside a battlefield, exchanging stories of the evils they have done. The victorious generals Macbeth and Banco enter. The witches hail Macbeth as Thane of Glamis (a title he already holds by inheritance), Thane of Cawdor, and king "hereafter." Banco is greeted as "lesser than Macbeth, but greater", never a king himself, but the progenitor of a line of future kings. The witches vanish, and messengers from the king appear naming Macbeth Thane of Cawdor. Macbeth protests that the holder of that title is still alive, but the messengers reply that the former Thane has been executed as a traitor. Banco, mistrusting the witches, is horrified to find that they have spoken the truth. In a duet, Macbeth and Banco muse that the first of the witches' prophecies has been fulfilled. Macbeth ponders how close he is to the throne, and whether fate will crown him without his taking action, yet dreams of blood and treachery; Banco ponders on whether the minions of Hell will sometimes reveal an honest truth in order to lead one to future damnation.

Scene 2: Macbeth's castle

Lady Macbeth reads a letter from her husband telling of the encounter with the witches. She is determined to propel Macbeth to the throne – by fair means or foul.

[Revised version, 1865: Vieni! t'affretta!/ "Come! Hurry!"].

Lady Macbeth is advised that King Duncan will stay in the castle that night; she is determined to see him killed (Or tutti, sorgete / "Arise now, all you ministers of hell"). When Macbeth returns she urges him to take the opportunity to kill the King. The King and the nobles arrive and Macbeth is emboldened to carry out the murder (Mi si affaccia un pugnal? / "Is this a dagger which I see before me?"), but afterwards is filled with horror. Disgusted at his cowardice, Lady Macbeth completes the crime, incriminating the sleeping guards by smearing them with Duncan's blood and planting on them Macbeth's dagger. Macduff arrives for an appointment with the King, while Banco stands guard, only for Macduff instead to discover the murder. He rouses the castle while Banco also bears witness to the fact of Duncan's murder. The chorus calls on God to avenge the killing (Schiudi, inferno, . . / "Open wide thy gaping maw, O Hell").

=== Act 2 ===
Scene 1: A room in the castle

Macbeth is now king: Duncan's son Malcolm has fled the country, suspicion having conveniently fallen on him for his father's murder: but Macbeth is still disturbed by the prophecy that Banco, not he, will found a great royal line. To prevent this he tells his wife that he will have both Banco and his son murdered as they come to a banquet. There follows her aria Trionfai! / I have triumphed!.

[1865 revised version: In her aria, La luce langue / "The light fades", Lady Macbeth exults in the powers of darkness]

Scene 2: Outside the castle

A gang of murderers lie in wait. Banco, sensing danger, shares his misgivings with his son. (Come dal ciel precipita / "O, how the darkness falls from heaven"). The murderers attack and stab him to death, but his son escapes.

Scene 3: A dining hall in the castle

Macbeth receives the guests and Lady Macbeth sings a brindisi (Si colmi il calice / "Fill up the cup"). The assassination is reported to Macbeth, but when he returns to the table the ghost of Banco is sitting in his place. Macbeth raves at the ghost and the horrified guests believe he has gone mad. Lady Macbeth manages to calm the situation once – and even mocks it by calling for a toast to the absent Banco (whose death is not yet public knowledge), only for the ghost to appear a second time and terrify Macbeth into insanity again. Macduff resolves to leave the country, saying it is ruled by a cursed hand and only the wicked may remain: the other guests are terrified by Macbeth's talk of ghosts, phantoms and witches. The banquet ends abruptly with their hurried, frightened departure.

=== Act 3 ===
The witches' cave

The witches gather around a cauldron in a dark cave. Macbeth enters and they conjure up three apparitions for him. The first advises him to beware of Macduff. The second tells him that he cannot be harmed by a man 'born of woman'. The third that he cannot be conquered till Birnam Wood marches against him. (Macbeth: O lieto augurio / "O, happy augury! No wood has ever moved by magic power")

Macbeth is then shown the ghost of Banco and his descendants, eight future Kings of Scotland, verifying the original prophecy. (Macbeth: Fuggi regal fantasima / "Begone, royal phantom that reminds me of Banco"). He collapses, but regains consciousness in the castle.

[Original 1847 version: The act ends with Macbeth recovering and resolving to assert his authority: Vada in fiamme, e in polve cada / "Macduff's lofty stronghold shall / Be set fire....".]

A herald announces the arrival of the Queen (Duet: Vi trovo alfin! / "I've found you at last"). Macbeth tells his wife about his encounter with the witches and they resolve to track down and kill Banco's son, as well as Macduff (of whose flight they do not yet know) and his family. (Duet: Ora di morte e di vendetta / "Hour of death and of vengeance").

=== Act 4 ===
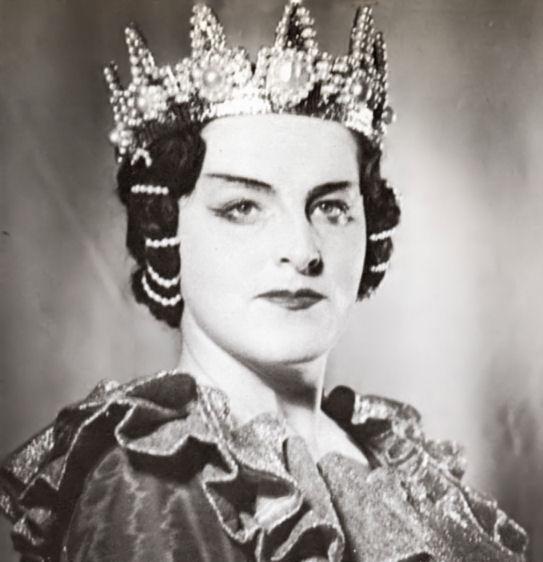
Birgit Nilsson as Lady Macbeth, 1947

Scene 1: Near the border between England and Scotland

Scottish refugees stand near the English border (Chorus: Patria oppressa / "Down-trodden country"):

[Original 1847 version: While each version uses the same libretto, the music of this chorus is different. It begins with a less ominous, much shorter orchestral introduction and is sung straight through by the entire chorus.]

[1865 revised version: the music is divided into sections for the male and female members, then it unites them towards the end. The revised version is 2 minutes longer than the original.]

In the distance lies Birnam Wood. Macduff is determined to avenge the deaths of his wife and children at the hands of the tyrant (Ah, la paterna mano / "Ah, the paternal hand"). He is joined by Malcolm, the son of King Duncan, and the English army. Malcolm orders each soldier to cut a branch from a tree in Birnam Wood and carry it as they attack Macbeth's army. They are determined to liberate Scotland from tyranny (Chorus: La patria tradita / "Our country betrayed").

Scene 2: Macbeth's castle

A doctor and a servant observe the Queen as she walks in her sleep, wringing her hands and attempting to clean them of blood (Una macchia è qui tuttora! / "Yet here's a spot"). She raves about the deaths of both Duncan and Banco, and even about the deaths of Macduff's family, and that all the perfumes of Arabia would not clean the blood off her hands: all are things that the horrified witnesses would never dare to repeat to any living man.

Scene 3: The battlefield

Macbeth has learned that an army of Scottish rebels backed by England is advancing against him, but is reassured by remembering the words of the apparitions, that no man born of woman can harm him. However, in an aria (Pietà, rispetto, amore / "Compassion, honour, love") he contemplates the fact that he is already hated and feared: there will be no compassion, honour and love for him in his old age even if he wins this battle, nor kind words on a royal tomb, only curses and hatred. He receives the news of the Queen's death with indifference. Rallying his troops he learns that Birnam Wood has indeed come to his castle. Battle is joined.

[Original 1847 version's ending: Macduff pursues and fights Macbeth who falls. He tells Macbeth that he was not "born of woman" but "ripped" from his mother's womb. Fighting continues. Mortally wounded, Macbeth, in a final aria – Mal per me che m'affidai / "Trusting in the prophecies of Hell" – proclaims that trusting in these prophecies has caused his downfall. He dies on stage, while Macduff's men proclaim Malcolm to be the new King.]

Macduff pursues and fights Macbeth who falls wounded. He tells Macbeth that he was not "born of woman" but "untimely ripped" from his mother's womb. Macbeth responds in anguish (Cielo! / "Heaven") and the two continue fighting, then disappear from view. Macduff returns indicating to his men that he has killed Macbeth. He then turns to Malcolm, hailing him as King. The scene ends with a hymn to victory sung by bards, soldiers, and Scottish women (Salve, o re!/ "Hail, oh King!). Malcolm as King, and Macduff as hero, together swear to restore the realm to greatness.

== Music ==
Writing in the New Grove Dictionary, musicologist Roger Parker sees the opera as revealing Verdi's "attention to detail and sureness of effect unprecedented in earlier works. This holds true as much for the 'conventional' numbers....as for formal experiments like the Macbeth-Banquo duettino in act 1." But Deryck Cooke, in his 1964 essay "Shakespeare into Music", argues that Macbeth is inferior to both Verdi's later works inspired by Shakespeare (Otello, Falstaff) and the Bard's original:

Only during the present Verdi craze could his Macbeth be seriously set beside its tremendous original. What can we make of a Macbeth who pursues his fatal vision through a musical desert of the old fustian recitative, or a Lady Macbeth whose prayer to be unsexed is a barn-storming martial cabaletta? In the "Grand scena di sonnambulismo", admittedly, Verdi did so magically stroke the big strumming guitar of his orchestra, and so chasten the vocal pride of Italian 'bel canto, as to foreshadow his achievements of some forty years later.

Baldini's analysis of the structure of the score in relation to the drama (and the comparison between the two versions) is highly detailed and worthy of examination. He notes that it is not always the 1865 material which is better or more suited than that from 1847. While he is not alone in raising the issue of the contrast between the 1847 version and that of 1865 ("the passage of 18 years was just too long to allow him to re-enter his original conception at every point"), in the final analysis for musicologist Julian Budden, the disparity between the versions cannot be reconciled. However, along with Parker, he does concede that "even the traditional elements are better handled than in Attila or Alzira [and] the arias grow organically from the implications of their own material, rather than from the deliberate elaboration of a formula."

The role of Lady Macbeth, written for the preeminent soprano Marianna Barbieri-Nini, is widely considered among the most demanding in the operatic repertory. It requires the singer to have immense dramatic intensity, stamina, range, and ability to navigate difficult passages of vocal agility, as well as massive shifts in tessitura, ranging from that of a low mezzo, to a high soprano in certain sections. The vocal and dramatic feats required of the character have often given breakthroughs for various operatic singers in their careers, such as the Greek-American soprano Maria Callas and the American mezzo Shirley Verrett, who both took on the role at La Scala decades apart, to great acclaim.
