= Tartarini =

Tartarini is an Italian surname. Notable people with the surname include:

- Alfredo Tartarini (1845–1905), Italian painter
- Corrado Tartarini (died 1602), Italian Roman Catholic bishop
