= Palazzo Zagnoni =

Building in Bologna, Italy

Coordinates: 44°29′24.05″N 11°20′48.00″E

The Palazzo Zagnoni, also known as Palazzo Spada, is a Neoclassic-style palace located on Via Castiglione 25–27, in Bologna, region of Emilia-Romagna, Italy.

== History ==
The palace was originally built by the senatorial Ariosti family, who resided here starting in 1414. The place was reconstructed in 1540. In 1706, the palace was acquired by Giuseppe Maria Zagnoni, whose family lived in the adjacent structure. To his properties were added the houses of Cavazza and Poeti.

In 1756 the marchese Antonio, son of Giuseppe Maria, obtained permission from the Senate to substitute the wooden pilasters with a stone portico. This work proceeded until 1764, when the son of Antonio, Giuseppe, commissioned the present Neoclassic facade from Francesco Tadolini. The casa Cavazza and casa Poeti maintained their facades. After the Napoleonic convulsions, the Zagnoni were forced to sell may properties and the impressive Zagnoni collection of art was mostly sold in the 19th century.

The interior decoration was commissioned by Prince Clemente Spada Veralli, from Girolamo dal Pane, who painted marine divinities. Sculpture was provided by Massimiliano Putti, and fresco ornamentation was provided by Giuseppe Badiali and Giuseppe Manfredini. The last heir of the Spada Veralli sold the palace to the Circolo della Caccia, an exclusive hunting club, in 1927. They still own the property.
