= Gaetano Lodi =

Italian painter (1830–1886)

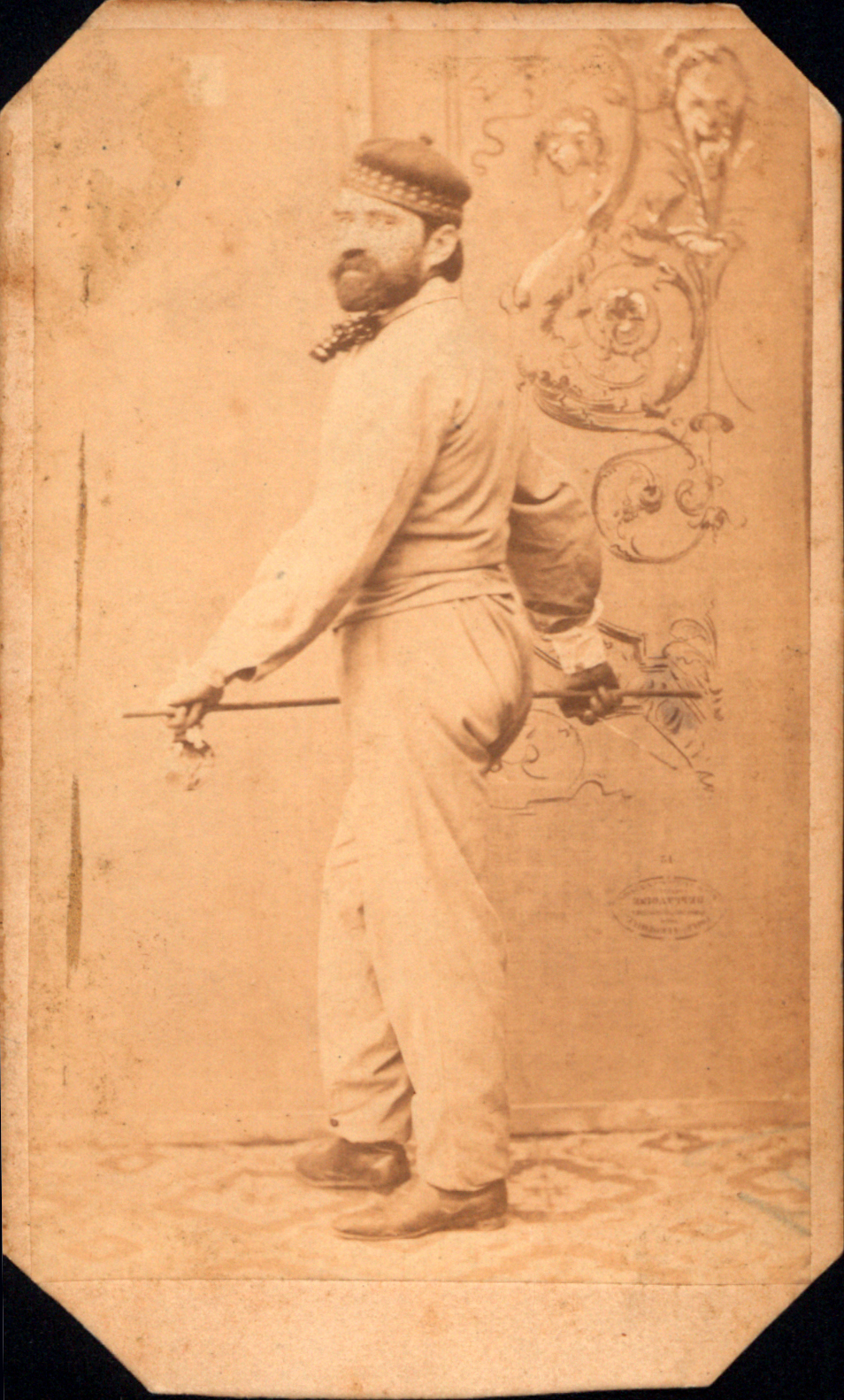
Gaetano Lodi while painting a wall decoration

Gaetano Lodi (1830–1886) was an Italian painter who worked mainly in ornamental decoration as well as genre subjects. He was professor of ornamentation at the Academy of Fine Arts of Bologna.

Lodi was born in Crevalcore. He initially trained under Giuseppe Badiali, then Giuseppe Manfredini, and finally Andrea Pesci. He painted ephemeral decorations in 1857 for the visit to Bologna of Pius IX. He also painted various fresco decorations including in the palazzi Rossi and Dal Monte of Bologna, and in 1859 for the Teatro Comunale of San Giovanni in Persiceto.

In 1862, he helped decorate the portico and some rooms of the main offices of the Banca d'Italia. In 1864, the architect Giuseppe Mengoni, commissioned some decorations for the Galleria Vittorio Emanuele II in Milan. This gained him commissions to help decorate the Casino Reale di San Rossore (1870), an octagonal meeting room in the Banca d'Italia in Florence, a stairwell in the Palazzo Quirinale of Rome, and decoration for Palazzo Reale di Torino (scalone). Between 1873 and 1877, he traveled to Cairo in Egypt to paint for the Khedive and other commissions. This allowed him to paint the Sala Egizia of the Palazzo Sanguinetti.

Among his pupils are Edoardo Breveglieri, Alfredo Tartarini, and Augusto Sezanne. In 1881 he painted the atrium of the theater in Crevalcore. In this period he became artistic director of the Società Cooperativa delle Ceramiche d'Imola.
