= Augusto Sezanne =

Italian painter (1856–1935)

Augusto Sezanne (31 August 1856 – 5 May 1935) was an Italian painter, active in a Naturalist style of landscape painting. He also worked as engraver, ceramist and architect.

== Biography ==
Sezanne was born on 31 August 1856 in Florence. He completed his studies at the Academy of Bologna, and was resident in that city till 1893. He trained under Gaetano Lodi. He became professor of decoration at that Academy. He reproduced the form and aspects of a person or thing with great exactitude. His first painting was exhibited at the 1880 Exhibition of Fine Arts in Turin, was a painting titled: Requiem. In 1881 in Milan, he displayed Una giornata di Dicembre (animali). In the 1883 Solemn Exposition of the Società d'incoraggiamento di Belli Arti in Florence, he exhibited the painting April, Armonie primaverili, and Autumnalia. in 1883 at Rome, his Tempo triste and Sotto i Faggi was well received. In 1884 at the Turin Exposition, he displayed Meriggio stanco.

In 1884 at the Exposition solenne della Società d'incoraggiamento of Fine Arts in Florence, he displayed the painting Palude. In 1886 at Milan, he exhibited I Tepori primaverili. In 1887 at the National Artistic Exposition in Venice, he exhibited Sole di inverno e della Tristezza invernale. In 1888, at Bologna, he displayed paintings of the Bolognese countryside, including la Cieca and Sole di Inverno.

In 1893, he moved to Venice, and became professor at the Accademia di Belle Arti. He played a role in the planning of the 1897 Venice Biennale. In 1898, he joints the association called "Aemila Ars" involved in the promotion of the applied or industrial arts, which included creation of designs for furniture, glass pieces, and ceramics.

Among his major architectural projects was the casa Stagni in Canton de' Fiori (1880–1892) and the Palazzina Majani (1908), a cafe in central Bologna.

Sezanne died on 5 May 1935 in Venice.
