= Palazzina Majani, Bologna =

Building in Bologna, Italy

Coordinates: 44°29′43.08″N 11°20′33.07″E

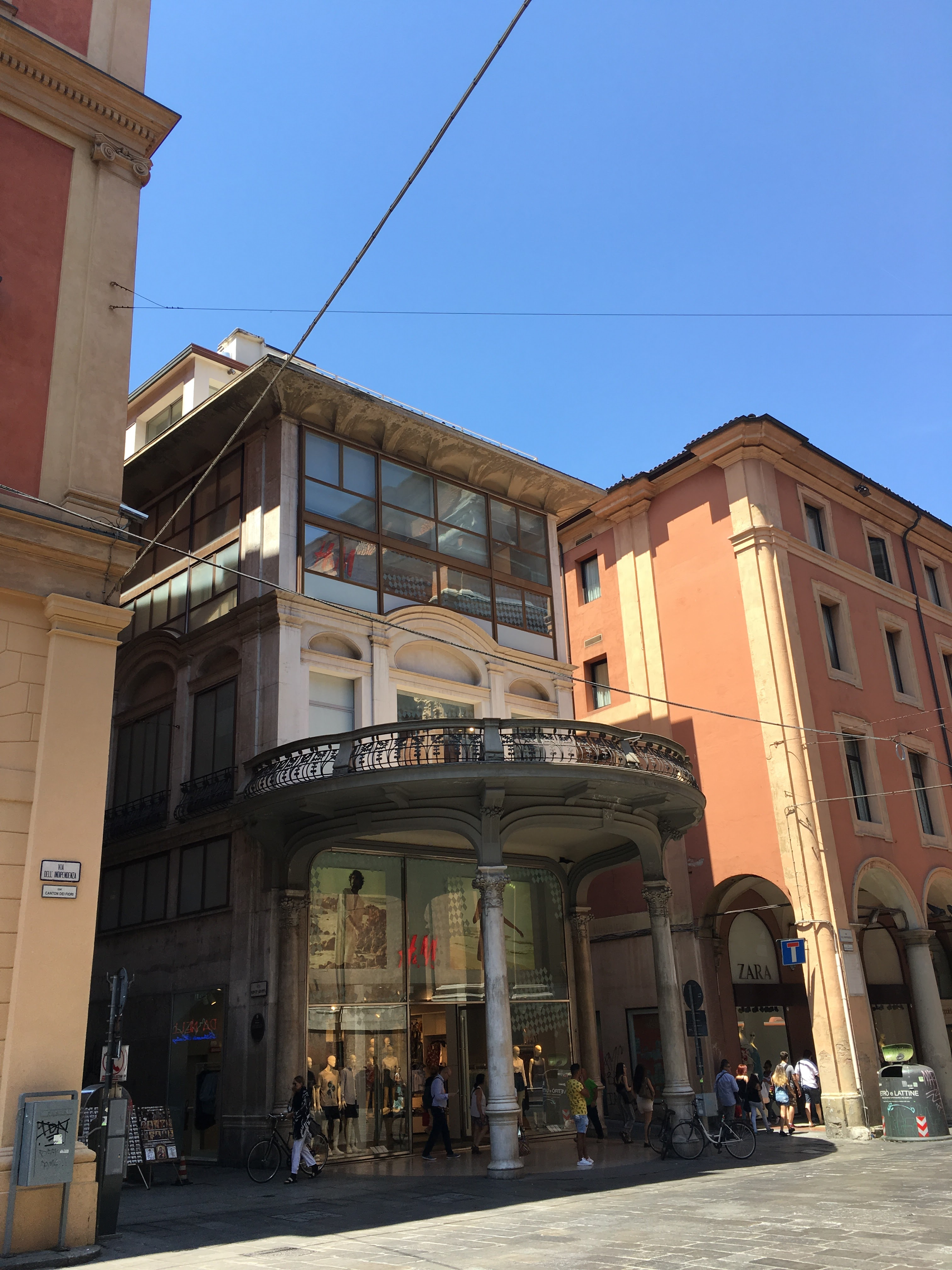
Palazzina Majani in Bologna, Italy

The Palazzina Majani is a small Art Nouveau palace located on Via Indipendenza #4 in central Bologna, region of Emilia-Romagna, Italy.

== History ==
Originally built in 1908 by the Majani Chocolate company, using designs of the architect Augusto Sezanne (1856–1935). The building housed both a cafe and the company offices. The second story, which now has an open balcony with only a decorative metal railing, once had an enclosed small ball-room for events. The third floor facade had more conventional windows than the glass box present now.

In the early twentieth century, this cafe, along with the caffè San Pietro across the street, hosted many of the artists in the city and visitors to the nearby Hotel Baglioni.

In its day, some Italians still wary of Austrian influence to the north, derided the insertion of this architectural novelty interrupting the more staid portico facades, with its rounded protruding second floor delicately perched on leggy columns as "a Viennese chair meant to trip pedestrians", or as a "pretentious braided kepi"

Soon after a restructuring in a modernist style by Melchiorre Bega, the elaborate indoor decorations were destroyed by fire in 1937. At the end of the war, the facilities were occupied by British troops. The caffè Majani was closed in 1953, though the chocolate company still exists. The site became a bank, and later a clothing boutique.
