= Gaetano Belvederi =

Italian painter

Gaetano Belvederi (1821–1872) was an Italian painter, active in Bologna.

He studied at the Collegio Venturoli. Among his works are:

- The Funeral Procession (convoglio funebre) di Zerbino
- Flight of Angelica Galeazzo Marescotti
- Italian mothers in the field after the Battle of San Martino
- Rocco Sileo brings poison to his imprisoned Son
- A Poor Woman Takes her Children to Fight for the Nation
- A Law lesson of the Pannier (dalla bigoncia) di San Stefano in Bologna
- Portrait of Napoleon 3rd for the Marchese Luigi Pizzardi still at Palazzo Legnani Pizzardo, Bologna

== Bibliography ==
- Renzo Grandi, ed. (1983). Dall'Accademia al vero. La pittura a Bologna prima e dopo l'Unità d'Italia (in Italian). Casalecchio di Reno: Grafis. pp. 199–200. ASIN B001GLE6F2.
