= Francesco Tadolini =

Italian architect

Francesco Tadolini (1723 – August 31, 1805) was an Italian architect of the neoclassic period, active mainly in his native Bologna. Among his works are the facade of the Palazzo Malavasia (1760), the Palazzo Zagnoni, the facade and sacristy of the church of San Giovanni dei Celestini (1765). He was also active in designing work for San Domenico and the Palazzo Laderchi in Faenza. He brother. Petronio, was also a collaborator, was mainly a sculptor and engraver of medals and coins. Petronio's grandson was the sculptor, Adamo Tadolini. His brother Luigi was a painter, a follower of Gaetano Gandolfi.
