= Alfredo Tartarini =

Italian painter

Alfredo Tartarini (Bologna 1845 – Bologna 1905) was an Italian painter, depicting frescoes and decorative subjects.

== Bologna ==
He was a pupil of Salvatore Tomaselli and Tito Azzolini at the Accademia of Fine Arts of Bologna. In 1887 and 1880, he won the premio Curlandese for perspective painting. He collaborated with Alfonso Rubbiani in the decoration of the Palazzo della Mercanzia, and in paintings for the churches of San Francesco and San Petronio in Bologna. He curated the 1903 entries to the Emilian section of the Biennale di Venezia. He was active in a stilo Liberty.
