= Cesare Badiali =

Italian opera singer

Cesare Badiali was an Italian baritone opera singer. He was born in Bologna in 1810 and died on 17 November 1865. He debuted in Trieste in 1827.

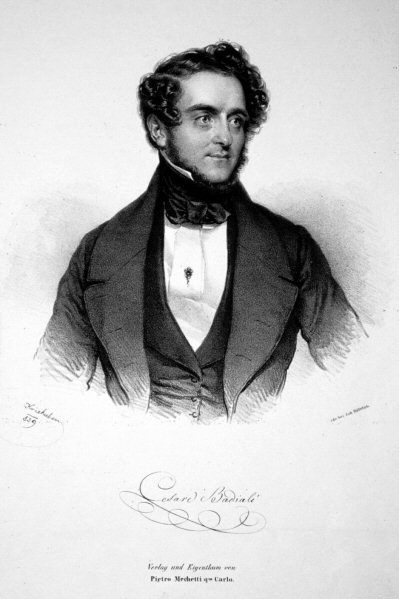
A lithograph of Cesare Badiali by Josef Kriehuber, 1839

== Biography ==
Badiali was born in Bologna in 1810. During his childhood, his family moved to Imola. Here, young Badiali began to study double bass and lute, using his new skills to perform in the churches of Imola and occasionally elsewhere as an amateur singer. As he moved into his adulthood, he abandoned music for a more secure job as a tax collector, as soon he would take a wife and desire a family. However, while in Bologna for pleasure in 1827, the famed Giovanni Tadolini discovered his talents and encouraged him to make a career out of his voice, as did his future manager Bassi.

Initially, Badiali turned down Bassi's offer and returned to Imola. Bassi offered a new contract of fifteen hundred francs, which was enough to convince him to leave and work in Trieste. He debuted at the Teatro Comunale, playing the high priest of the Israelites in Generali's Il vote di Jefte. Badiali's popularity soared, and he soon found himself among his greatest contemporaries.

He first sang at La Scala in Milan in 1830 and did so again in the 1831–1832 season, with performances of pieces such as Gli esiliati in Siberia by Donizetti and Rossini's Otello. For five seasons between 1832 and 1838, he performed in Spain and Portugal, and was celebrated upon his first piece performed after his return to Italy, Il pirata by Bellini.

Badialli spent his time from 1839 to 1842 singing in Vienna and throughout the 1840s quite successfully in Rome. The next decade was spent traveling the world, from America to England.

He had a notable friendship with the great composer Rossini. Badiali sang in Rossini's Bologna home in 1830 as Rossini accompanied. The two met again in Paris in 1859 at Italian Theater. Badiali's legacy remains one of an incomparably moving voice. It had been said by some at the time: "There is no dramatic baritone living as that man [Badiali]."

== Influence ==
The Italian's voice inspired many. Acclaimed American poet Walt Whitman reminisced about the influence of Badiali, stating: "My younger life was so saturated with the emotions, raptures, up-lifts, of such musical experiences [as hearing Cesare Badiali]...".
