= Giuseppe Badiali =

Italian painter and scenic designer

Giuseppe Badiali (1797 – after 1850) was an Italian painter and scenic designer.

== Biography ==
Best known for his scenography, Badiali also frescoed the ceiling of the Teatro Comunale of Bologna, now lost but for designs. Among his scenography, it included work for that theater, including: Semiramide by Rossini (spring 1827) and the Carnival 1829–1830; I Capuleti e i Montecchi (autumn 1832), La sonnambula and I Puritani (spring 1836), by Bellini; Nabucodonosor, Ernani (autumn 1847), Macbeth e Luisa Miller (autumn 1850), by Verdi.

For the Teatrino Loup of Bologna, he provided scenery for Elisa delle Alpi (1836) by C. Baldini; In Reggio Emilia, for their Teatro Comunale, Dirce by A. Peri, Dianora de' Bardi (1843) by E. Priora; in Turin for the Teatro Carignano, Gemma di Vergy (1839) by Donizetti; and for the Teatro Regio, Guglielmo Tell by Rossini, Oberto, Conte di San Bonifacio by Verdi, Il Templario (1840) by O. Nicolai; in Florence for the Teatro Alfieri, Il crociato in Egitto (1832) by Giacomo Meyerbeer; in Rome for the Teatro Apollo, Roberto Devereux (1838) and Marin Faliero by Donizetti, Medea in Corinto (1839) by Selli.

Among his collaborators were S. Fantoni and L. Martinelli.
