= Kable =

Kable may refer to:

- Glenn Kable (born 1963), a Fijian sport shooter who specializes in the trap
- Henry Kable (1763–1846), an Englishman convicted of burglary and sent to the penal colony of Australia
- Kable House, a building that housed the Staunton Military Academy from 1873 to 1976, in Staunton, Virginia
- Kabletown, an unincorporated community in Jefferson County, West Virginia, United States
- Mike Kable Young Gun Award, an Australian award for the best rookie V8 supercar driver
- Kable v Director of Public Prosecutions (NSW), an important Australian legal case about imprisonment for public protection
- Gamer (film), a 2009 American science fiction, action, thriller film, the main character is named, Kable
- the former German name for the village of Kawle, a village in Sępólno County, Kuyavian-Pomeranian Voivodeship, in north-central Poland

== See also ==
- Cable (disambiguation)
- Cabel (disambiguation)
- Kabel (disambiguation)
