= Cabell =

Cabell is both a surname and a given name. The Cabell family has "been prominent in Virginia since the American Revolution." Notable people with the name include:

== Surname ==
- Agnes Sarah Bell Cabell (1783–1863), First Lady of Virginia from 1805 to 1808
- Ben E. Cabell (1858–1931), American attorney and mayor of Dallas
- Charles P. Cabell (1903–1971), United States Air Force general and Deputy Director of the CIA
- DeRosey Caroll Cabell (1861–1924), United States Army major general
- Earle Cabell (1906–1975), American politician
- Edward C. Cabell (1816–1896), American politician
- Enos Cabell (born 1949), American Major League Baseball player
- George Cabell (1836–1906), American politician
- George Cabell (physician) (1766–1823), physician from Virginia
- Jake Cabell, American college football coach and former player
- James Branch Cabell (1879–1958), American author of fantasy fiction
- James Lawrence Cabell (1813–1889), American doctor and author
- Joseph Carrington Cabell (1778–1856), American politician
- Katie Doswell Cabell (1861–1927), American socialite and clubwoman
- Mary Barnes Cabell (1815–1900), American freedwoman who married her former owner
- Mary Virginia Ellet Cabell (1839–1930), vice president presiding of the Daughters of the American Revolution
- Mike Cabell (born 1985), American politician
- Nicole Cabell (born 1977), American opera singer
- Richard Cabell (died 1677), Englishman believed to be the inspiration for Hugo Baskerville in Arthur Conan Doyle's novel The Hound of the Baskervilles
- Samuel I. Cabell (1802–1865), Virginia plantation owner who may have been murdered for marrying one of his former slaves
- Samuel Jordan Cabell (1756–1818), American Revolutionary War officer, planter and politician
- William Cabell (disambiguation)

== Given name ==
- Cabell R. Berry (1848–1910), American politician
- Cabell Breckinridge (1788–1823), American lawyer, soldier, slaveholder and politician
- Cab Calloway (1907–1994), American jazz singer and bandleader
- W. Cabell Greet (1901–1972), American philologist and English professor
- Cabell Tennis (1932–2026), American Episcopalian Bishop of Delaware

== See also ==
- Cable (disambiguation)
- Cabel, a surname
