= Cabell (disambiguation) =

Cabell is a surname and given name. It may also refer to:

- Cabell County, West Virginia, United States
- Cabell Publishing, an American scholarly analytics company
- USS Cabell, a World War II cargo ship
- Cabell v. Chavez-Salido, a 1982 United States Supreme Court case

== See also ==
- Cabell City, Oregon, United States, a ghost town and former mining town
- Cabel, a list of people with the surname
- Arent Arentsz (1585–1631), Dutch landscape painter also known as Cabel
