= Samuel Cabell =

Samuel Cabell may refer to:

- Samuel Jordan Cabell (1756–1818), American Revolutionary war officer and U.S. congressman
- Samuel I. Cabell (died 1865), plantation owner
