= Jodie Devos =

Belgian operatic soprano (1988–2024)

- Devos in 2014
- Born: 10 October 1988; Libramont, Belgium
- Died: 16 June 2024 (aged 35); Paris, France
- Education: Royal Academy of Music
- Occupation: Operatic soprano
- Years active: 2014–2024
- Organizations: Opéra-Comique
- Website: www.jodiedevos.com

Jodie Devos (10 October 1988 – 16 June 2024) was a Belgian operatic coloratura soprano, the second-prize winner of the Queen Elisabeth Competition in 2014. Based at the Opéra-Comique in Paris from 2014, she appeared internationally, with a focus on the French repertoire such as Philine in Mignon and Ophélie in Hamlet, both by Ambroise Thomas, and the title role of Lakmé by Leo Delibes. She performed as Susanna in Mozart's Le nozze di Figaro, the title role of Donizetti's La fille du régiment, and as Gilda in Verdi's Rigoletto at the Opéra Royal de Wallonie, Olympia in Offenbach's Les contes d'Hoffmann at the Opéra Bastille, and as Donizetti's Lucia di Lammermoor at the Grand Théâtre de Québec.

Her solo albums won her critical acclaim and awards; her first was Offenbach – Colorature, a collection of coloratura arias by Jacques Offenbach on the occasion of his bicentenary, the second, And Love Said, a selection of love songs, and the third, Bijoux perdus, of pieces that the Belgian soprano Marie Cabel had created and performed.

== Biography ==
Jodie Devos was born on 10 October 1988 in Libramont-Chevigny, Belgium. At the age of five, she was enrolled by her parents in singing classes, which focused on popular music. When she later took dance classes, she discovered her love for classical music. She took singing classes from age 16, and then studied voice at the Institut Supérieur de Musique et de Pédagogie (IMEP) in Namur, with Élise Gäbele and Benoît Giaux. She studied further at the Royal Academy of Music in London with Lillian Watson, graduating with a master's degree in 2013. Devos took master classes with Helmut Deutsch, J. Streets and Marc Minkowski. She was a laureate of national competitions, including the Concours Bell'Arte, the Fonds Thirionet, Les Nouveaux Talents de l'Art Lyrique and the Prix Jacques Dôme. She joined the studio of the Opéra-Comique in Paris, where her roles included Serpina in Pergolesi's La Serva padrona, Blonde in Mozart's Die Entführung aus dem Serail, and Miss Wordsworth in Britten's Albert Herring.

In 2014, she entered the Queen Elisabeth Competition and achieved second place, and was also awarded the audience prize. She joined the ensemble of the Opéra-Comique, where she appeared as Ida and later Adele in Strauss' Die Fledermaus and in Louis Varney's Les mousquetaires au couvent. She appeared as the Queen of the Night in Mozart's Die Zauberflöte at the Opéra Bastille and La Monnaie, as Olympia in Offenbach's Les contes d'Hoffmann at the Opéra Bastille, as Rosina in Rossini's Il barbiere di Siviglia, as Eurydice in Offenbach's Orphée aux enfers, Susanna in Mozart's The Marriage of Figaro, the title role of Donizetti's La fille du régiment, and as Gilda in Verdi's Rigoletto at the Opéra Royal de Wallonie. She performed at the Opéra national de Montpellier as Fire, Princess and Nightingale in Ravel's L'Enfant et les sortilèges in L'Hirondelle inattendue by Simon Laks and as Offenbach's Geneviève de Brabant.

She appeared at the Paris Opera first as Yniold in Debussy's Pelléas et Mélisande in 2017. In 2019 Devos appeared at the Bastille as both Amour and Zaire in Rameau's Les Indes galantes, and a reviewer noted that she "can move between authority and the most moving fragility". She performed the role of Olimpia in Offenbach's Les contes d'Hoffmann there in 2020.

After the COVID-19 pandemic, Devos performed in operas by Ambroise Thomas at the Opéra Royal de Wallonie, as Philine in Mignon, and as Ophélie in Hamlet. She performed there also the title role of Lakmé by Leo Delibes, and a reviewer described her voice as pure like bells and with secure high notes, perfectly suited to the Bell aria, but convincing also in the lyric moments and love duets with Philippe Talbot as Gérard. She appeared in the title role of Donizetti's Lucia di Lammermoor in French in 2023, both in Tours and at the Grand Théâtre de Québec.

Devos performed in concerts in Stuttgart, Maastricht and Wigmore Hall in London, among others. She also performed in Poland, India, Canada, the United States and Brazil. She collaborated with conductors including Roland Böer, Mikko Franck, Leonardo García Alarcón, Dmitri Jurowski, Enrique Mazzola, Christophe Rousset and Guy Van Waas.

Devos died from breast cancer in Paris on 16 June 2024, at the age of 35.

== Recordings ==
Devos released three solo albums. The first album, Offenbach – Colorature, contains coloratura arias by Jacques Offenbach, played with the Munich Radio Orchestra conducted by Laurent Campellone. It was released in 2019 to mark the bicentenary of the composer's birth. Her second album, And Love Said, appeared in 2021, combining songs from three countries that meant much to her. Reviewer Hugo Shirley from Gramophone wrote:

The soprano's voice is clear and controlled, limpid but full of quiet strength, bright and healthy but with the slightest hint of a quivering vibrato.

Her third album, Bijoux perdus, of pieces that the Belgian soprano Marie Cabel favoured, appeared in 2022, with the Flemish Radio Choir and the Brussels Philharmonic, conducted by Pierre Bleuse.

== Honours and awards ==
- 2014: Knight in the Walloon Order of Merit
- 2015: International Classical Music Awards Young Talent of the Year
- 2015: Honorary Citizen of Namur, Belgium
- 2015: Association of the Belgian Music Press Young Musician of the Year
- 2019: Diapason d'Or Récital vocal of the Year for Offenbach Colorature
- 2019: Oper! Award Best Solo Album for Offenbach Colorature
