= Mary Cabell =

Mary Cabell may refer to:

- Mary Barnes Cabell (1815–1900), American freedwoman who married her former owner
- Mary Virginia Ellet Cabell (1839–1930), vice president presiding of the Daughters of the American Revolution
