= Cable (surname) =

Cable is a surname of English origin, dating back to medieval England. Notable people with the surname include:

- Ayrton Cable (born 2003), social activist and entrepreneur, grandson of Vince Cable
- Frank Cable (1863–1945), American engineer, an early pioneer in submarine development
- George Washington Cable (1844–1925), American novelist
- Harvey S. Cable (1861–1924), American politician
- Jack Cable (politician) (1924–2021), Canadian politician
- Jack Cable (software developer) (born 2000), American computer security researcher and software developer
- James Cable (1920–2001), British diplomat and naval strategic thinker
- James Ray Cable (1938–2013), American serial killer and rapist
- Rigel Cable (born 1988), stage name Rigel Gemini, American musician
- Shawn Cable (born 1980), Canadian lacrosse player
- Stuart Cable (1970–2010), British drummer
- Theodore Cable, Indianapolis politician
- Tom Cable (born 1964), American football coach
- Vince Cable (born 1943), British politician

== See also ==
- Cabel, a list of people with the surname
