= Cabel =

Surname

Cabel is a surname. Notable people with the surname include:

- Adriaen van der Cabel (1631–1705), Dutch landscape painter
- Edmond Cabel (1832–1888), Belgian opera tenor, brother of Marie
- Eitan Cabel (born 1959), Israeli politician
- Marie Cabel (1827–1885), Belgian opera soprano, sister of Edmond

== See also ==
- Cabell, a list of people with the surname or given name
- Cable (disambiguation)
  - Cable (surname)
