= Jack Cable =

Jack Cable may refer to:

- Jack Cable (politician) (1934–2021), Canadian politician
- Jack Cable (software developer) (born 2000), American computer security researcher and software developer

== See also ==
- John L. Cable, U.S. Representative from Ohio
