= Cable =

Cable may refer to:

== Mechanical ==
- Nautical cable, an assembly of three or more ropes woven against the weave of the ropes, rendering it virtually waterproof
- Wire rope, a type of rope that consists of several strands of metal wire laid into a helix
  - Arresting cable, part of a system used to rapidly decelerate an aircraft as it lands
  - Bowden cable, a mechanical cable for transmitting forces
- Rope generally, especially a thick, heavy ("cable laid") variety

== Transmission ==
- Electrical cable, an assembly of one or more wires which may be insulated, used for transmission of electrical power or signals
  - Coaxial cable, an electrical cable comprising an inner conductor surrounded by a flexible, tubular insulating layer, coated or surrounded by a tubular conducting shield
  - Power cable, a cable used to transmit electrical power
  - Submarine communications cable, a cable laid on the sea bed to carry telecommunication signals between land-based stations
- Fiber-optic cable, a cable containing one or more optical fibers
- Networking cable, used to connect network devices
- Telecommunications cable, used for telecommunications in general

=== Communication by cable ===
- Cable television, a system of providing television programs to consumers via electrical cables
- Cablegram, a telegram sent over a submarine telegraph cable
  - Diplomatic cable, a confidential text message exchanged between a diplomatic mission and the foreign ministry of its parent country

== Places ==
- Cable Street, London, UK
- Cable, Illinois, an unincorporated community
- Cable, Ohio, an unincorporated community
- Cable, Minnesota, an unincorporated community
- Cable, Wisconsin, a town
  - Cable (CDP), Wisconsin, an unincorporated community within the town
- Cable Building (New York City)

== Music ==
- Cable (British band), a British alternative rock band
- Cable (American band), an American metalcore band
- The Cables, a Jamaican rocksteady/reggae group
- Cables, a song by Big Black from Bulldozer

== People ==
- Cable (surname), including a list of people with the name
- Cable A. Wirtz (1910–1980), justice of the Supreme Court of Hawaii

== Other uses ==
- Cable (foreign exchange), the British pound/US dollar currency pair rate
- Cable knitting, a style of knitting in which textures of crossing layers are achieved by permuting stitches
- Cable length, a unit of distance related to the nautical mile
- Cable (character), a superhero in Marvel Comics
- TheCable, a Nigerian online newspaper
- Cable (comic book), several comics series featuring the Marvel character
- USS Cable (ARS-19), a US Navy rescue and salvage ship
- USS Frank Cable (AS-40), a US Navy submarine tender
- Cable knot, in mathematics (knot theory)
- Cables (film), 1992 Israeli comedy film

== See also ==
- Cabal (disambiguation)
- Cabell
- Category:Wire and cable manufacturers
