= Pauline Mailhac =

Austrian opera singer

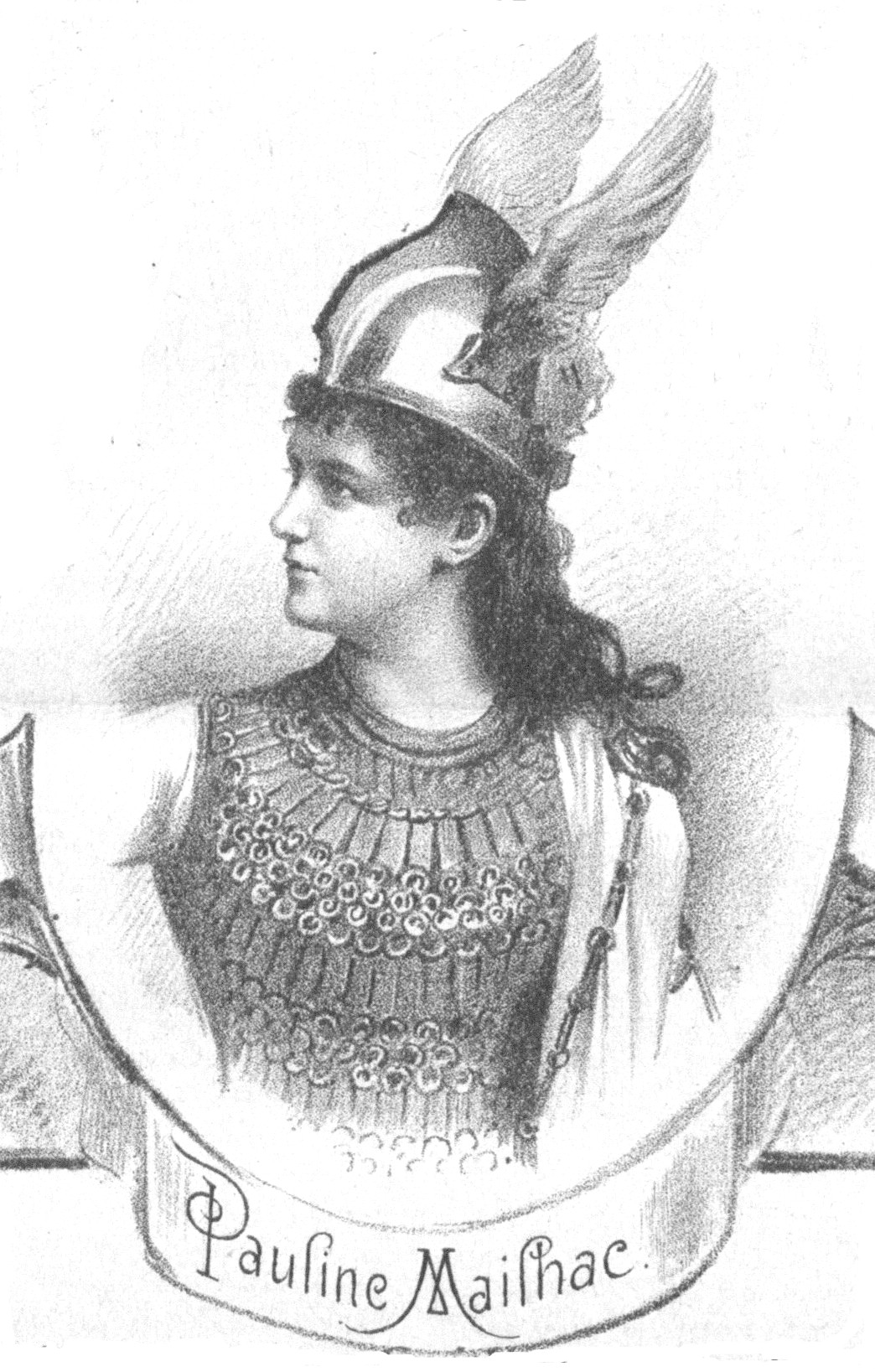
Ignaz Eigner: Pauline Mailhac (1891)

Pauline Rebekka Mailhac (4 May 1858 – 9 March 1946), born in Vienna, Austria, was an operatic soprano in southern Germany, known particularly for roles in operas of Richard Wagner.

== Life ==
She was born in Vienna; her father Franz Rebeka was a tailor, and her mother was Rosa Katharina Johanna née Mailhač. As a child she sang in church concerts, and had further musical training in Vienna with Otto Uffmann and Alexander Seitz. Her first engagement in an opera house was in 1879, at the Stadttheater in Würzburg as Valentine in Les Huguenots. From 1880 to 1882 she appeared in opera in Königsberg, and from 1882 to 1883 in Mainz.

From 1883 to 1901 she sang at the Hoftheater in Karlsruhe. She became a celebrated member of the company, and was notable for roles in operas of Richard Wagner, particularly as Isolde (in Tristan und Isolde) and Brünnhilde (in operas of Der Ring des Nibelungen). She was in the first complete performance, in December 1890, of Hector Berlioz's opera Les Troyens, in the roles of Didon and Hecuba. In 1891 to 1893 she appeared at the Bayreuth Festival, as Venus in Tannhäuser and as Kundry in Parsifal. In 1894 she appeared at the Munich Opera Festival. During her career she sang in concerts in Germany, Belgium and the Netherlands.

Mailhac's farewell performance was in June 1901 in Karlsruhe, as Brünnhilde in Götterdämmerung. She retired to Burghausen in Bavaria, where her mother and siblings had settled. She died there in 1946.
