= Les Troyens =

Opera by Hector Berlioz

- Grand opera by Hector Berlioz
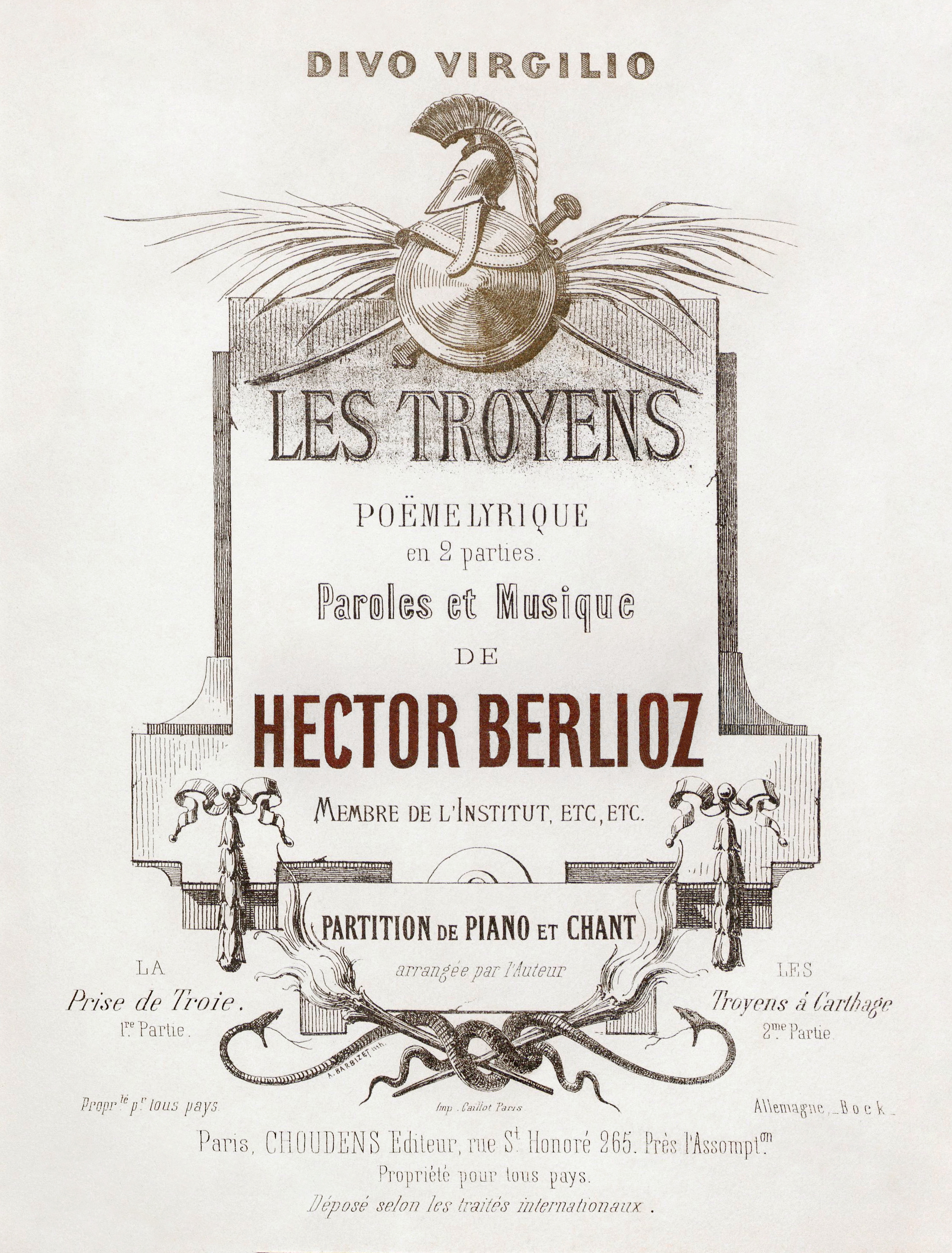
- Cover of the Choudens edition of the vocal score
- Librettist: Berlioz
- Language: French
- Based on: The Aeneid by Virgil
- Premiere: 4 November 1863 (last three acts); Théâtre de la Ville, Paris

Les Troyens (pronounced [le tʁwajɛ̃]; in English: The Trojans) is a French grand opera in five acts, running for about five hours, by Hector Berlioz. The libretto was written by Berlioz himself from Virgil's epic poem the Aeneid; the score was composed between 1856 and 1858. Les Troyens is Berlioz's most ambitious work, the summation of his entire artistic career, but he did not live to see it performed in its entirety. Under the title Les Troyens à Carthage, the last three acts were premièred with many cuts by Léon Carvalho's company, the Théâtre Lyrique, at their theatre (now the Théâtre de la Ville) on the Place du Châtelet in Paris on 4 November 1863, with 21 repeat performances. The reduced versions run for about three hours. After decades of neglect, today the opera is considered by some music critics as one of the finest ever written.

== Composition history ==
Berlioz began the libretto on 5 May 1856 and completed it toward the end of June 1856. He finished the full score on 12 April 1858. Berlioz had a keen affection for literature, and he had admired Virgil since his childhood. The Princess Carolyne zu Sayn-Wittgenstein was a prime motivator to Berlioz to compose this opera.

At that time I had completed the dramatic work I mentioned earlier ..Four years earlier I happened to be in Weimar at the home of Princess Wittgenstein – a devoted friend of Liszt, and a woman of character and intelligence who has often given me support in my darkest hours. I was led to talk of my admiration for Virgil and of the idea I had formed of a great opera, designed on Shakespearean lines, for which Books Two and Four of the Aeneid would provide the subject-matter. I added that I was all too aware of the pain that such an undertaking would inevitably cause me ever to embark on it. 'Indeed,' the princess replied, 'the conjunction of your passion for Shakespeare and your love of antiquity must result in the creation of something grand and novel. You must write this opera, this lyric poem; call it what you like and plan it as you wish. You must start work on it and bring it to completion.' As I persisted in my refusal: 'Listen,' said the princess, 'if you shrink before the hardships that it is bound to cause you, if you are so weak as to be afraid of the work and will not face everything for the sake of Dido and Cassandra, then never come back here, for I do not want to see you ever again.' This was more than enough to decide me. Once back in Paris I started to write the lines for the poem of Les Troyens. Then I set to work on the score, and after three and a half years of corrections, changes, additions etc., everything was finished. [I polished] the work over and over again, after giving numerous readings of the poem in different places, listening to the comments made by various listeners and benefiting from them to the best of my ability ... .

On 3 May 1861, Berlioz wrote in a letter: "I am sure that I have written a great work, greater and nobler than anything done hitherto." Elsewhere he wrote: "The principal merit of the work is, in my view, the truthfulness of the expression." For Berlioz, truthful representation of passion was the highest goal of a dramatic composer, and in this respect he felt he had equalled the achievements of Gluck and Mozart.

== Early performance history ==
=== Premiere of the second part ===
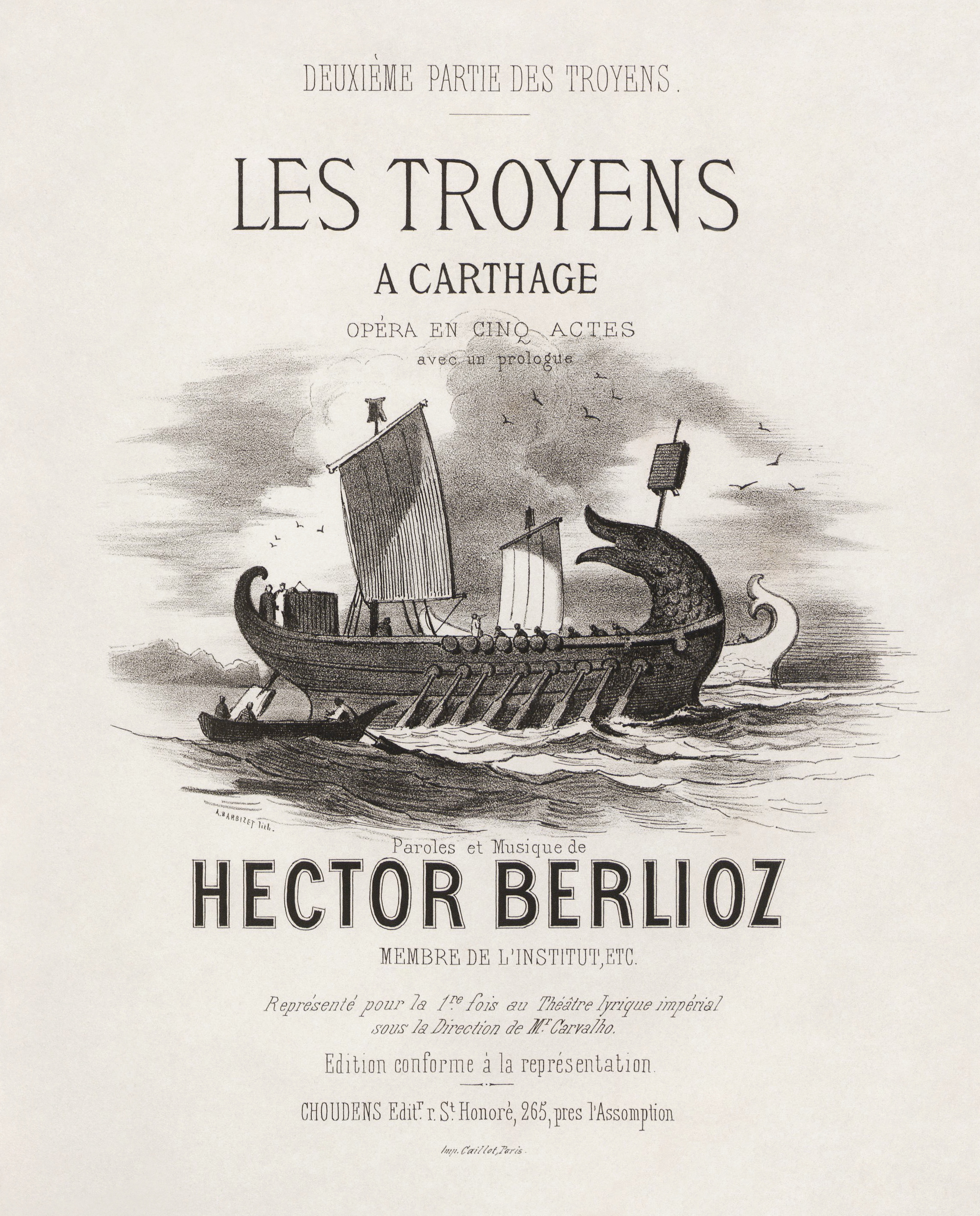
Cover of the 1863 Choudens vocal score for Les Troyens à Carthage, the second half of the opera, and first part performed.

In his memoirs, Berlioz described in excruciating detail the intense frustrations he experienced in seeing the work performed. For five years (from 1858 to 1863), the Paris Opéra – the only suitable stage in Paris – vacillated. Finally, tired of waiting, he agreed to let Léon Carvalho, director of the smaller Théâtre Lyrique, mount a production of the second half of the opera with the title Les Troyens à Carthage. It consisted of Acts 3 to 5, redivided by Berlioz into five acts, to which he added an orchestral introduction (Lamento) and a prologue. As Berlioz noted bitterly, he agreed to let Carvalho do it "despite the manifest impossibility of his doing it properly. He had just obtained an annual subsidy of a hundred thousand francs from the government. Nonetheless the enterprise was beyond him. His theater was not large enough, his singers were not good enough, his chorus and orchestra were small and weak."

Even with this truncated version of the opera, many compromises and cuts were made, some during rehearsals, and some during the run. The new second act was the Chasse Royale et Orage ("Royal Hunt and Storm") [no. 29], an elaborate pantomime ballet with nymphs, sylvans and fauns, along with a chorus. Since the set change for this scene took nearly an hour, it was cut, despite the fact its staging had been greatly simplified with a painted waterfall backdrop rather than one with real water. Carvalho had originally planned to divert water from the nearby Seine, but during the rehearsals, a faulty switch nearly caused a disaster. The entries of the builders, sailors, and farm-workers [nos. 20–22], were omitted because Carvalho found them dull; likewise, the scene for Anna and Narbal [nos. 30–31] and the second ballet [no. 33b]. The sentries' duet [no. 40] was omitted, because Carvalho had found its "homely style... out of place in an epic work". Iopas's stanzas [no. 25] disappeared with Berlioz's approval, the singer De Quercy "charged with the part being incapable of singing them well." The duet between Didon and Énée [no. 44] was cut because, as Berlioz himself realized, "Madame Charton's voice was unequal to the vehemence of this scene, which took so much out of her that she would not have had the strength left to deliver the tremendous recitative Dieux immortels! il part! [no. 46], the final aria [Adieu, fière cité, no. 48], and the scene on the pyre [nos. 50–52]." The "Song of Hylas" [no. 38], which was "greatly liked at the early performances and was well sung", was cut while Berlioz was at home sick with bronchitis. The singer of the part, Edmond Cabel, was also performing in a revival of Félicien David's La perle du Brésil, and since his contract only required him to sing fifteen times per month, he would have to be paid an extra two hundred francs for each additional performance. Berlioz lamented: "If I am able to put on an adequate performance of a work of this scale and character I must be in absolute control of the theatre, as I am of the orchestra when I rehearse a symphony."

Even in its less than ideal form, the work made a profound impression. For example, Giacomo Meyerbeer attended 12 performances. Berlioz's son Louis attended every performance. A friend tried to console Berlioz for having endured so much in the mutilation of his magnum opus and pointed out that after the first night audiences were increasing. "See," he said encouragingly to Berlioz, "they are coming." "Yes," replied Berlioz, feeling old and worn out, "they are coming, but I am going." Berlioz never saw the first two acts, later given the name La prise de Troie ("The Capture of Troy").

=== Early concert performances of portions of the opera ===
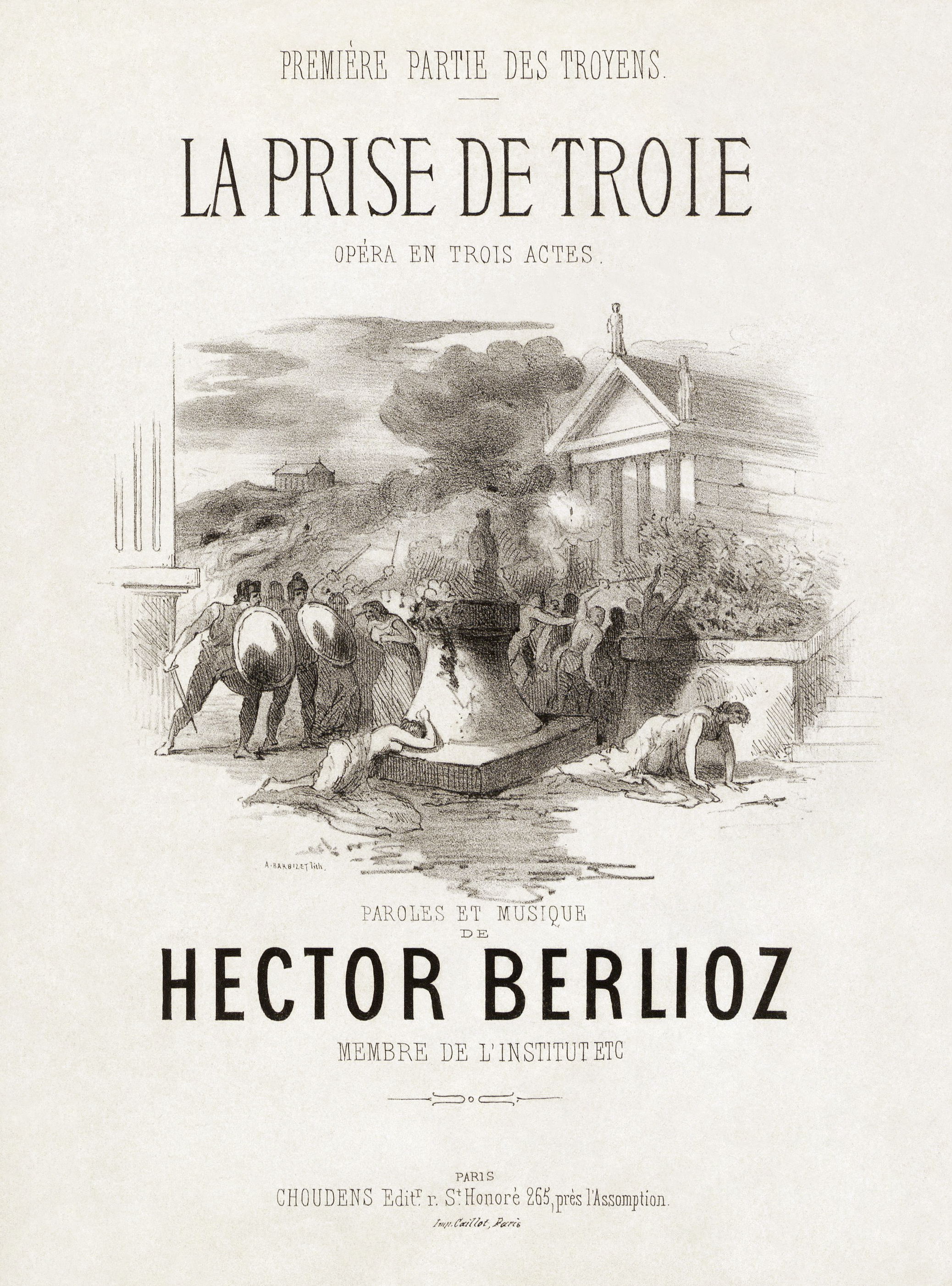
The Choudens vocal score illustration for La Prise de Troie, the first part of the opera.

After the premiere of the second part at the Théâtre Lyrique, portions of the opera were next presented in concert form. Two performances of La prise de Troie were given in Paris on the same day, 7 December 1879: one by the Concerts Pasdeloup at the Cirque d'Hiver with Anne Charton-Demeur as Cassandre, Stéphani as Énée, conducted by Ernest Reyer; and another by the Concerts Colonne at the Théâtre du Châtelet with Leslino as Cassandre, Piroia as Énée, conducted by Edouard Colonne. These were followed by two concerts in New York: the first, Act 2 of La prise de Troie, was performed in English on 6 May 1882 by Thomas's May Festival at the 7th Regiment Armory with Amalie Materna as Cassandre, Italo Campanini as Énée, conducted by Theodore Thomas; the second, Les Troyens à Carthage (with cuts), was given in English on 26 February 1887 at Chickering Hall with Marie Gramm as Didon, Max Alvary as Énée, and possibly conducted by Frank Van der Stucken.

=== First performance of both parts ===
The first staged performance of the whole opera took place only in 1890, 21 years after Berlioz's death. The first and second parts, in Berlioz's revised versions of three and five acts, were sung on two successive evenings, 6 and 7 December, in German at Großherzoglichen Hoftheater in Karlsruhe (see Roles). This production was frequently revived over the succeeding eleven years and was sometimes given on a single day. The conductor, Felix Mottl, took his production to Mannheim in 1899 and conducted another production in Munich in 1908, which was revived in 1909. He rearranged some of the music for the Munich production, placing the "Royal Hunt and Storm" after the love duet, a change that "was to prove sadly influential." A production of both parts, with substantial cuts in the second part, was mounted in Nice in 1891.

In subsequent years, according to Berlioz biographer David Cairns, the work was thought of as "a noble white elephant – something with beautiful things in it, but too long and supposedly full of dead wood. The kind of maltreatment it received in Paris as recently as last winter in a new production will, I'm sure, be a thing of the past."

== Publication of the score ==
At the time of the 1863 production of Les Troyens à Carthage, Berlioz permitted the Parisian music editors Choudens et C^{ie} to publish the vocal score as two separate operas. Only 15 copies of the first edition were printed, at the composer's expense. In this published score, he introduced a number of optional cuts which have often been adopted in subsequent productions. Berlioz complained bitterly of the cuts that he was more or less forced to allow at the 1863 Théâtre Lyrique premiere production, and his letters and memoirs are filled with the indignation that it caused him to "mutilate" his score.

In his July 1867 will Berlioz lamented that Choudens had failed to meet their contractual obligation to engrave the full score and asked his executors to ensure the opera "be published without cuts, without modifications, without the least suppression of the text — in sum exactly as it stands." In the late 1880s, after a lawsuit, the firm printed the full scores of La prise de Troie and Les Troyens à Carthage, orchestral parts, and an improved vocal score, but only the vocal score was sold. The remaining material was only made available for short-term hire.

In the early 20th century, the lack of accurate parts led musicologists W. J. Turner and Cecil Gray to plan a raid on the publisher's Paris office, even approaching the Parisian underworld for help.

In 1969, Bärenreiter Verlag of Kassel, Germany, first published the full score of Les Troyens in a critical edition containing all the compositional material left by Berlioz. The preparation of this critical edition was the work of Hugh Macdonald, whose Cambridge University doctoral dissertation this was. With its publication, as well as the release in 1970 of the first complete recording (based on Covent Garden performances conducted by Colin Davis), "it was finally possible to study and produce the whole work, and to judge it on its own merits."

In early 2016 the Bibliothèque nationale de France bought the 1859 autograph vocal score, which included scenes cut for the orchestral autograph score; the manuscript also includes annotations by Pauline Viardot.

== Later performance history ==
On 9 June 1892 the Paris Opéra-Comique staged Les Troyens à Carthage (in the same theatre as its premiere) and witnessed a triumphant debut for the 17-year-old Marie Delna as Didon, with Stéphane Lafarge as Énée, conducted by Jules Danbé; these staged performances of Part 2 continued into the next year.

In December 1906 the Théâtre de la Monnaie in Brussels commenced a run of performances with the two halves on successive nights.

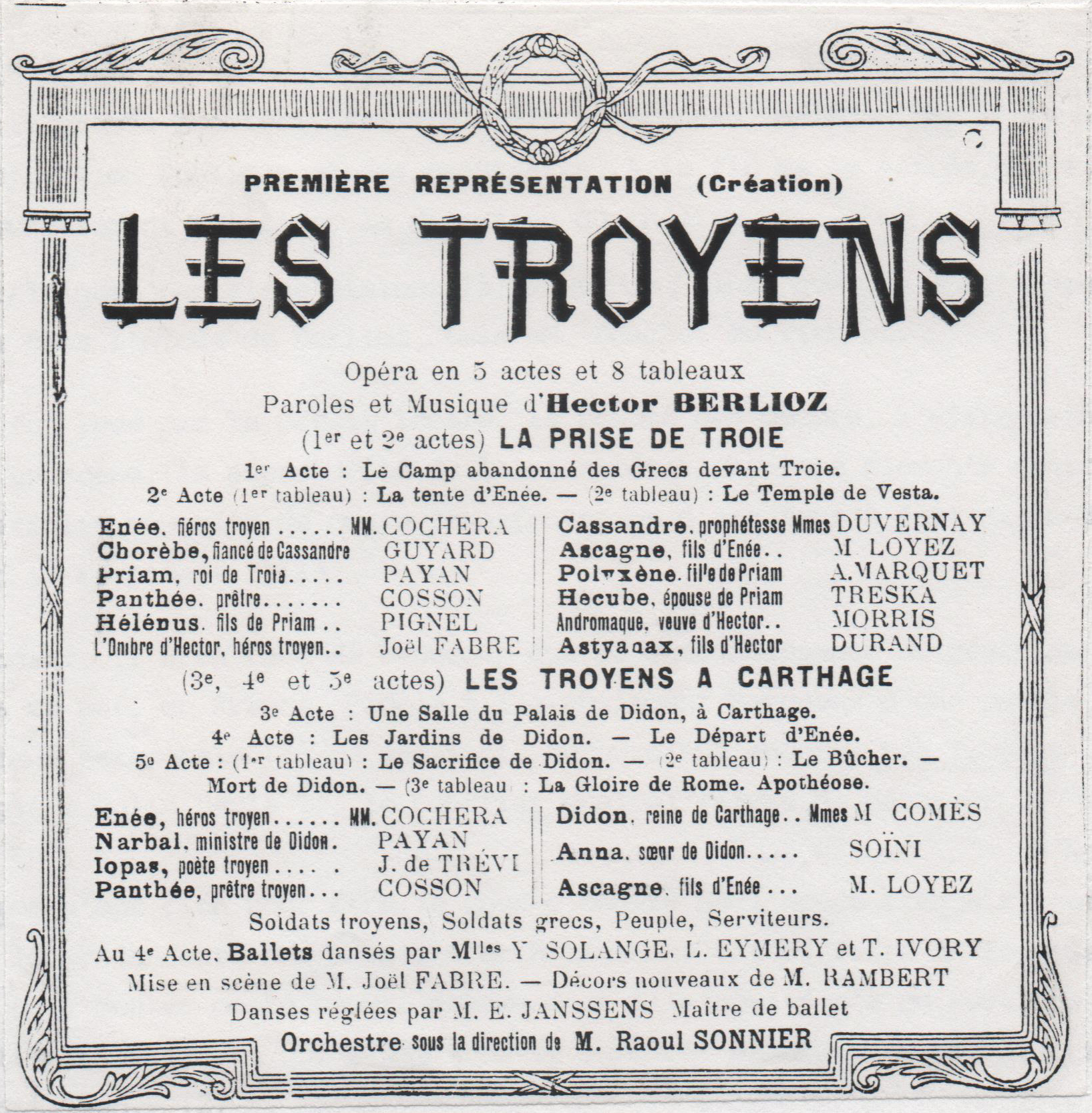
Poster for 1920 performances of Berlioz's Les Troyens in Rouen, France

On 6 February 1920, the Théâtre des Arts in Rouen staged what was probably the first French performance of Les Troyens on one night, with only a few cuts, which had been sanctioned by the author. The Opéra in Paris had presented a production of La prise de Troie in 1899, and in 1919 mounted a production of Les Troyens à Carthage in Nîmes. Both parts were staged at the Opéra in one evening on 10 June 1921, with mise-en-scène by Merle-Forest, sets by René Piot and costumes by Dethomas. The cast included Marguerite Gonzategui (Didon), Lucy Isnardon (Cassandre), Jeanne Laval (Anna), Paul Franz (Énée), Édouard Rouard (Chorèbe), and Armand Narçon (Narbal), with Philippe Gaubert conducting. Marisa Ferrer (who later sang the part under Sir Thomas Beecham in London) sang Didon in the 1929 revival, with Germaine Lubin as Cassandre and Franz again as Énée. Georges Thill sang Énée in 1930. Lucienne Anduran was Didon in 1939, with Ferrer as Cassandre this time, José de Trévi as Énée, and Martial Singher as Chorèbe. Gaubert conducted all performances in Paris before the Second World War.

In the UK, concert performances of Les Troyens à Carthage took place in 1897 and 1928, then in 1935 a complete Les Troyens was performed by Glasgow Grand Opera Society, directed by Scottish composer Erik Chisholm.

Les Troyens was performed for the first time in London in a concert performance conducted by Sir Thomas Beecham and broadcast at the BBC in 1947. His cast included Ferrer as both Didon and Cassandre, Jean Giraudeau as Énée and Charles Cambon as both Chorèbe (a role he had sung in Paris in 1929) and Narbal. An aircheck of this performance has been issued on CD. However, the 1957 production at the Royal Opera House, Covent Garden conducted by Rafael Kubelík and directed by John Gielgud, has been described as "the first full staging in a single evening that even approximated the composer's original intentions". It was sung in English.

=== 1960s ===
The Paris Opéra gave a new production of a condensed version of Les Troyens on March 17, 1961, directed by Margherita Wallmann, with sets and costumes by Piero Zuffi. Pierre Dervaux was the conductor, with Régine Crespin as Didon, Geneviève Serrès as Cassandre, Jacqueline Broudeur as Anna, Guy Chauvet as Énée, Robert Massard as Chorèbe and Georges Vaillant as Narbal; performances by this cast were broadcast on French radio. Several of these artists, in particular Crespin and Chauvet, participated in a set of extended highlights commercially recorded by EMI in 1965, Georges Prêtre conducting.

The performance of Les Troyens used at various productions at the Paris Opéra and by Beecham and by Kubelík in London were the orchestral and choral parts from Choudens et C^{ie} of Paris, the only edition then available.

The first American stage performance of Les Troyens (an abbreviated version, sung in English) was given by Boris Goldovsky with the New England Opera Theater on 27 March 1955, in Boston. The San Francisco Opera staged a heavily cut version of the opera (reducing it to about three hours), billed as the "American professional stage premiere", in 1966, with Crespin as both Cassandre and Didon and Canadian tenor Jon Vickers as Énée, and again in 1968 with Crespin and Chauvet; Jean Périsson conducted all performances.

On 5 May 1964 at the Teatro Colón in Buenos Aires, Crespin (as Cassandre and Didon) and Chauvet were the leads for the South American premiere, conducted by Georges Sébastian.

=== Performances using the critical edition ===
The critical edition score from Bärenreiter published in 1969 was first used in May that year by the Scottish Opera under Alexander Gibson, in performances sung in English. Colin Davis conducted a Covent Garden production sung in French in September and a parallel Philips recording was made. Tim Ashley of the Gramophone writes, the Philips recording "brought an entire generation of listeners to the work, and as [Berlioz's biographer David] Cairns puts it, it finally 'blew to smithereens the idea that the opera was a dead duck — the fruit of an old, worn-out composer.'" Ashley also asserts: "Understanding of [Berlioz's] achievement [as a composer] was also notably incomplete owing to the absence from the repertory of Les Troyens in any form in which we now recognise it. Its discovery [in 1969] was to bring in its wake a reappraisal of Berlioz's entire output which would decisively re-establish his position, even in France."

The first complete American production of Les Troyens (with Crespin as Didon) was given in February 1972 by Sarah Caldwell with her Opera Company of Boston, at the Aquarius Theater. On 17 March 1972, John Nelson conducted New Jersey's Pro Arte Chorale and Festival Orchestra in a concert performance of the complete opera at Carnegie Hall in New York. In 1973, Rafael Kubelík conducted the first Metropolitan Opera performances of Les Troyens, in the opera's first staging in New York City and the third staging in the United States. The performances included cuts (Nos. 20-22 and Nos. 45–46, half of Dido's final scene). Shirley Verrett was both Cassandre and Didon at the Metropolitan Opera House premiere, with Jon Vickers as Énée. Christa Ludwig had been cast as Didon but was ill at the time of the premiere; she sang the role in the ten subsequent performances. Les Troyens, with all the music restored, opened the Metropolitan's centenary season in 1983 under James Levine with Plácido Domingo, Jessye Norman as Cassandre and Tatiana Troyanos as Didon.

Six complete performances were given at Zurich Opera, all 5 acts on one night as Berlioz had intended in September 1990, directed by Tony Palmer. Les Troyens was staged again in 1990 for the opening of the new Opéra Bastille in Paris. It was a partial success, because the new theatre was not quite ready on opening night, which caused much trouble during rehearsals. The performance had several cuts, authorised by Berlioz, including some dances in the third act. A full staged version conducted by Charles Dutoit and produced by Francesca Zambello took place at the Los Angeles Opera on 14 September 1991, with Carol Neblett, Nadine Secunde and Gary Lakes. In 1993, Charles Dutoit conducted the Canadian premiere of Les Troyens in a full concert version with the Montreal Symphony and Deborah Voigt, Françoise Pollet and Gary Lakes which was subsequently recorded by Decca.

To mark the 200th anniversary of Berlioz's birth in 2003, Les Troyens was revived in productions at the Théâtre du Châtelet in Paris (conducted by John Eliot Gardiner), De Nederlandse Opera in Amsterdam (conducted by Edo de Waart), and at the Metropolitan in New York (with Lorraine Hunt Lieberson as Didon, conducted by Levine). The Met's production, by Francesca Zambello, was revived in the 2012–13 season with Susan Graham as Didon, Deborah Voigt as Cassandre, and Marcello Giordani and Bryan Hymel as Énée, conducted by Fabio Luisi. During June and July 2015 the San Francisco Opera presented the opera in a new production directed by Sir David McVicar that originated at the Royal Opera House in London. It featured Susan Graham as Didon, Anna Caterina Antonacci as Cassandre, and Bryan Hymel as Énée, conducted by Donald Runnicles.

== Critical evaluation ==
Knowing the work only from a piano reduction, the British critic W. J. Turner declared in his 1934 book on Berlioz that Les Troyens was "the greatest opera ever written." American critic B. H. Haggin heard in the work Berlioz's "arrestingly individual musical mind operating in, and commanding attention with, the use of the [Berlioz] idiom with assured mastery and complete adequacy to the text's every demand." David Cairns described the work as "an opera of visionary beauty and splendor, compelling in its epic sweep, fascinating in the variety of its musical invention... it recaptures the tragic spirit and climate of the ancient world." Hugh Macdonald said of it:

In the history of French music, Les Troyens stands out as a grand opera that avoided the shallow glamour of Meyerbeer and Halévy, but therefore paid the price of long neglect. In our own time the opera has finally come to be seen as one of the greatest operas of the 19th century. There are several recordings of the work, and it is performed with increasing frequency.

== Roles ==
Role	Voice type	Premiere cast, (Acts 3–5 only) 4 November 1863 (Conductor: Adolphe Deloffre)	Premiere cast, (complete opera) 6–7 December 1890 (Conductor: Felix Mottl)
Énée (Aeneas), Trojan hero, son of Venus and Anchises	tenor	Jules-Sébastien Monjauze	Alfred Oberländer
Chorèbe (Coroebus), a young prince from Asia, betrothed to Cassandre	baritone	–	Marcel Cordes
Panthée (Panthous), Trojan priest, friend of Énée	bass	Péront	Carl Nebe
Narbal, minister to Dido	bass	Jules-Émile Petit	Fritz Plank
Iopas, Tyrian poet to Didon's court	tenor	De Quercy	Hermann Rosenberg
Ascagne (Ascanius), Énée's young son (15 years)	soprano	Mme Estagel	Auguste Elise Harlacher-Rupp
Cassandre (Cassandra), Trojan prophetess, daughter of Priam	mezzo-soprano	–	Luise Reuss-Belce
Didon (Dido), Queen of Carthage, widow of Sychaeus, prince of Tyre	mezzo-soprano	Anne-Arsène Charton-Demeur	Pauline Mailhac
Anna, Didon's sister	contralto	Marie Dubois	Christine Friedlein
Supporting roles:
Hylas, a young Phrygian sailor	tenor or contralto	Edmond Cabel	Wilhelm Guggenbühler
Priam, King of Troy	bass	–	
A Greek chieftain	bass	–	Fritz Plank
Ghost of Hector, Trojan hero, son of Priam	bass		
Helenus, Trojan priest, son of Priam	tenor	–	Hermann Rosenberg
Two Trojan soldiers	basses	Guyot, Teste	
Mercure (Mercury), a God	baritone or bass		
A Priest of Pluto	bass		
Polyxène (Polyxena), sister of Cassandre	soprano	–	Annetta Heller
Hécube (Hecuba), Queen of Troy	soprano	–	Pauline Mailhac
Andromaque (Andromache), Hector's widow	silent	–	
Astyanax, her son (8 years)	silent	–	
Le Rapsode, narrator of the Prologue	spoken	Jouanny	–
Chorus: Trojans, Greeks, Tyrians and Carthaginians; Nymphs, Satyrs, Fauns, and Sylvans; Invisible spirits

== Instrumentation ==
Berlioz specified the following instruments:

- In the orchestra:
  - Woodwinds: piccolo, 2 flutes (2nd doubling piccolo), 2 oboes (2nd doubling English horn), 2 clarinets (2nd doubling bass clarinet), 4 bassoons
  - Brass: 4 horns, 2 trumpets, 2 valve cornets, 3 trombones, ophicleide or tuba
  - Percussion: timpani, triangles, bass drum, cymbals, tenor drum (caisse roulante), drum without snares (tambour sans timbre), tenor drum (tambourin), tam-tam, 2 pairs of small antique cymbals in E and F, 6 or 8 harps
  - Strings
- Offstage:
  - 3 oboes
  - 3 trombones
  - Saxhorns: sopranino in B♭ (petit saxhorn suraigu en si♭), sopranos in E♭ (or valve trumpets in E♭), altos in B♭ (or valve trumpets in B♭), tenors in E♭ (or horns in E♭), contrabasses in E♭ (or tubas in E♭)
  - Percussion: pairs of timpani, several pairs of cymbals, thunder machine (roulement de tonnerre), antique sistrums, tarbuka, tam-tam

== Synopsis ==
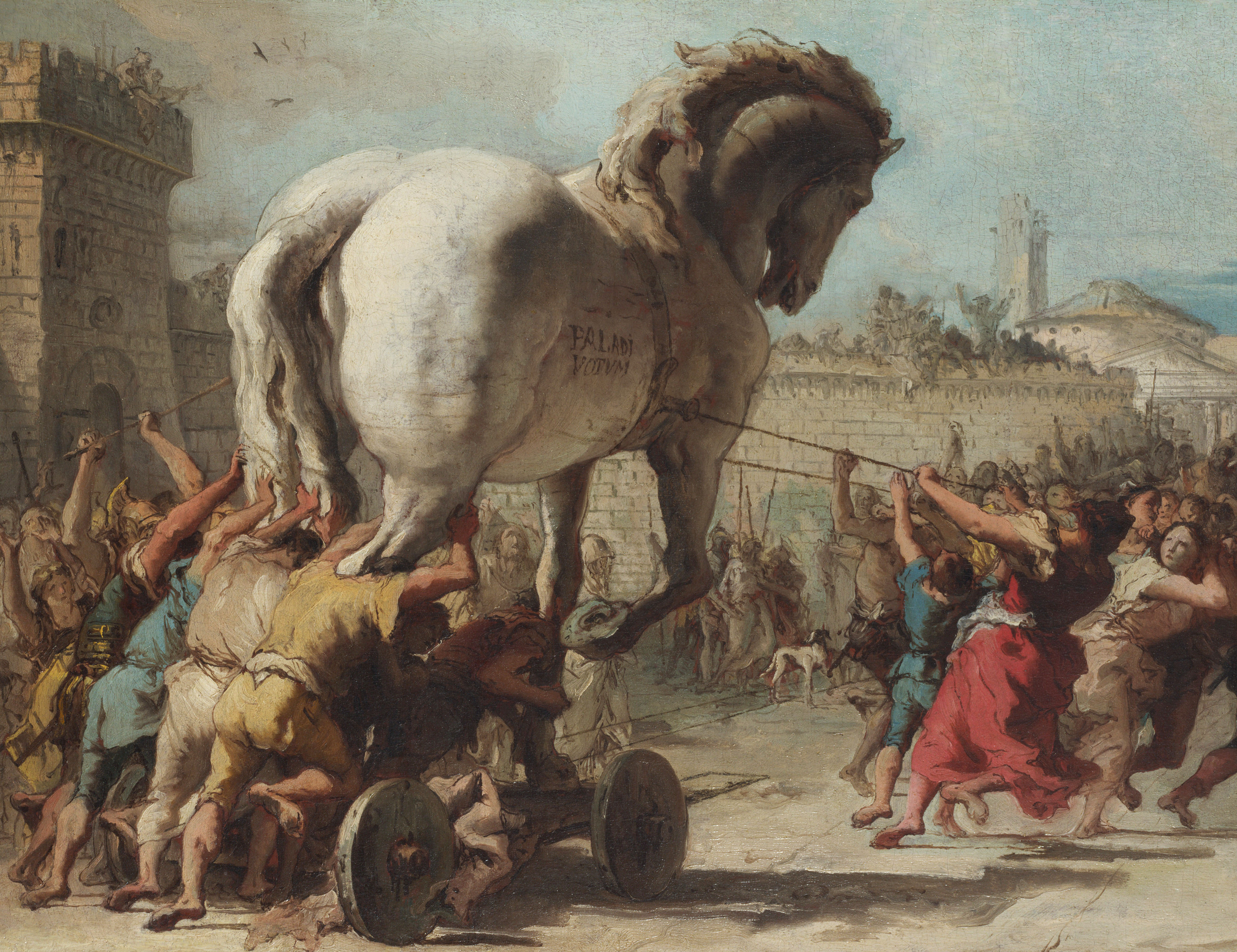
Detail from The Procession of the Trojan Horse in Troy by Domenico Tiepolo (1773).

=== Act 1 ===
At the abandoned Greek camp outside the walls of Troy

The Trojans are celebrating apparent deliverance from ten years of siege by the Greeks (also named the Achaeans in the opera). They see the large wooden horse left by the Greeks, which they presume to be an offering to Pallas Athene. Unlike all the other Trojans, however, Cassandre is mistrustful of the situation. She foresees that she will not live to marry her fiancé, Chorèbe. Chorèbe appears and urges Cassandre to forget her misgivings. But her prophetic vision clarifies, and she foresees the utter destruction of Troy. When Andromaque silently walks in holding her son Astyanax by the hand, the celebration halts.

A captive, Sinon, is brought in. He lies to King Priam and the crowd that he has deserted the Greeks, and that the giant wooden horse they have left behind was intended as a gift to the gods to ensure their safe voyage home. He says the horse was made so big that the Trojans would not be able to move it into their city, because if they did they would be invincible. This only makes the Trojans want the horse inside their city all the more.

Énée then rushes on to tell of the devouring of the priest Laocoön by a sea serpent, after Laocoön had warned the Trojans to burn the horse. Énée interprets this as a sign of the goddess Athene's anger at the sacrilege. Against Cassandre's futile protests, Priam orders the horse to be brought within the city of Troy and placed next to the temple of Pallas Athene. There is suddenly a sound of what seems to be the clashing of arms from within the horse, and for a brief moment the procession and celebrations stop, but then the Trojans, in their delusion, interpret it as a happy omen and continue pulling the horse into the city. Cassandre has watched the procession in despair, and as the act ends, resigns herself to death beneath the walls of Troy.

=== Act 2 ===
Before the act proper has started, the Greek soldiers hidden in the wooden horse have come out and begun to destroy Troy and its citizens.

Scene 1: Palace of Énée

With fighting going on in the background, the ghost of Hector visits Énée and warns him to flee Troy for Italy, where he will build a new Troy. After Hector fades, the priest Panthée conveys the news about the Greeks hidden in the horse. Ascagne appears with news of further destruction. At the head of a band of soldiers, Chorèbe urges Énée to take up arms for battle. All resolve to defend Troy to the death.

Scene 2: Palace of Priam

Several of the Trojan women are praying at the altar of Vesta/Cybele for their soldiers to receive divine aid. Cassandre reports that Énée and other Trojan warriors have rescued Priam's palace treasure and relieved people at the citadel. She prophesies that Énée and the survivors will found a new Troy in Italy. But she also says that Chorèbe is dead, and resolves to die herself. The other women acknowledge the accuracy of Cassandre's prophecies and their own error in dismissing her. Cassandre then calls upon the Trojan women to join her in death, to prevent being defiled by the invading Greeks. One group of women admits to fear of death, and Cassandre dismisses them from her sight. The remaining women unite with Cassandre in their determination to die. A Greek captain observes the women during this scene with admiration for their courage. Greek soldiers then come on the scene, demanding the Trojan treasure from the women. Cassandre defiantly mocks the soldiers, then suddenly stabs herself. Polyxène takes the same dagger and does likewise. The remaining women scorn the Greeks as being too late to find the treasure, and commit mass suicide, to the soldiers' horror. Cassandre summons one last cry of "Italie!" before collapsing, dead.

=== Act 3 ===
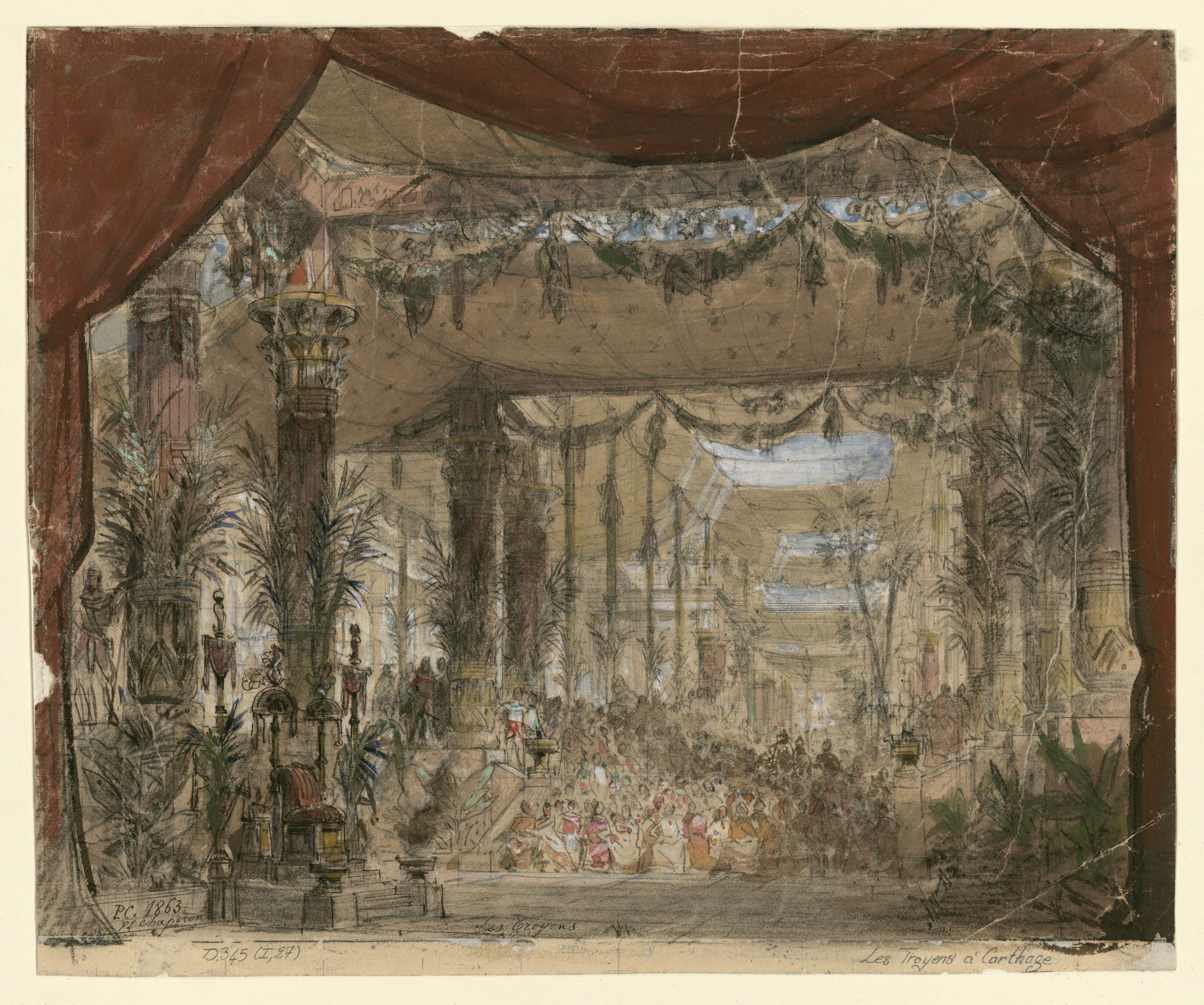
Set design for the throne room (1863)

Didon's throne-room at Carthage

The Carthaginians and their queen, Didon, are celebrating the prosperity that they have achieved in the past seven years since fleeing from Tyre to found a new city. Didon, however, is concerned about Iarbas, the Numidian king, not least because he has proposed a political marriage with her. The Carthaginians swear their defence of Didon, and the builders, sailors and farmers offer tribute to Didon.

In private after these ceremonies, Didon and her sister Anna then discuss love. Anna urges Didon to remarry, but Didon insists on honoring the memory of her late husband Sichée. The bard Iopas then enters to tell of an unknown fleet that has arrived in port. Recalling her own wanderings on the seas, Didon bids that these strangers be made welcome. Ascagne enters, presents the saved treasure of Troy, and relates the Trojans' story. Didon acknowledges that she knows of this situation. Panthée then tells of the ultimate destiny of the Trojans to found a new city in Italy. During this scene, Énée is disguised as an ordinary sailor.

Didon's minister Narbal then comes to tell her that Iarbas and his Numidian army are attacking the fields surrounding Carthage and are marching on the city. But Carthage does not have enough weapons to defend itself. Énée then reveals his true identity and offers the services of his people to help Carthage. Didon accepts the offer, and Énée entrusts his son Ascagne to Didon's care and joins the Carthaginians and Trojans in preparing for battle against the Numidians.

=== Act 4 ===
Scene 1: Royal Hunt and Storm (mainly instrumental)

This scene is a pantomime with primarily instrumental accompaniment, set in a forest with a cave in the background. A small stream flows from a crag and merges with a natural basin bordered with rushes and reeds. Two naiads appear and disappear, but return to bathe in the basin. Hunting horns are heard in the distance, and huntsmen with dogs pass by as the naiads hide in the reeds. Ascagne gallops across the stage on horseback. Didon and Énée have been separated from the rest of the hunting party. As a storm breaks, the two take shelter in the cave. At the climax of the storm, nymphs with dishevelled hair run to-and-fro over the rocks, gesticulating wildly. They break out in wild cries of "a-o" (sopranos and contraltos) and are joined by fauns, sylvans, and satyrs. The stream becomes a torrent, and waterfalls pour forth from the boulders, as the chorus intones "Italie! Italie! Italie!". A tree is hit by lightning, explodes and catches fire, as it falls to the ground. The satyrs, fauns, and sylvans pick up the flaming branches and dance with them in their hands, then disappear with the nymphs into the depths of the forest. The scene is slowly obscured by thick clouds, but as the storm subsides, the clouds lift and dissipate.

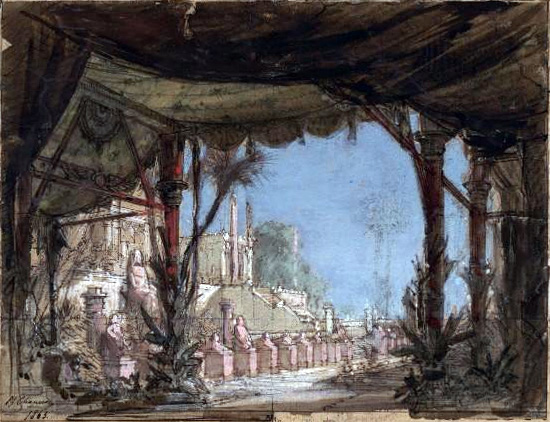
Gardens of Didon by the shore (1863)

Scene 2: The gardens of Didon by the shore

The Numidians have been beaten back, and both Narbal and Anna are relieved at this. However, Narbal worries that Didon has been neglecting the management of the state, distracted by her love for Énée. Anna dismisses such concerns and says that this indicates that Énée would be an excellent king for Carthage. Narbal reminds Anna, however, that the gods have called Énée's final destiny to be in Italy. Anna replies that there is no stronger god than love.

After Didon's entry, and dances from the Egyptian dancing girls, the slaves, and the Nubian slave girls, Iopas sings his song of the fields, at the queen's request.

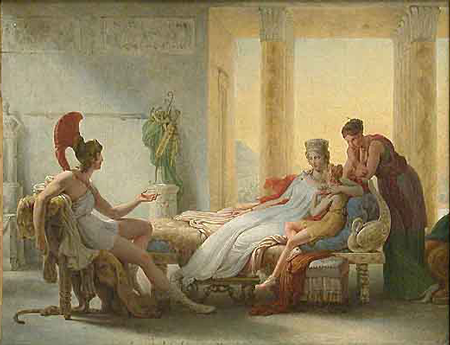
Énée et Didon by Guérin (1815).

She then asks Énée for more tales of Troy. Énée reveals that after some persuading, Andromaque eventually married Pyrrhus, the son of Achille, who killed Hector, Andromaque's earlier husband. Hearing about Andromaque remarrying, Didon then feels resolved regarding her lingering feelings of faithfulness to her late husband. Alone, Didon and Énée then sing a love duet. At the end of the act, as Didon and Énée slowly walk together towards the back of the stage in an embrace, the god Mercury appears and strikes Énée's shield, which the hero has cast away, calling out three times, "Italie!"

=== Act 5 ===
Scene 1: The harbor of Carthage

A young Phrygian sailor, Hylas, sings his song of longing for home, alone. Two sentries mockingly comment that he will never see his homeland again. Panthée and the Trojan chieftains discuss the gods' angry signs at their delay in sailing for Italy. Ghostly voices are heard calling "Italie! Italie! Italie!". The sentries, however, remark that they have good lives in Carthage and do not want to leave.

Énée then comes on stage, singing of his despair at the gods' portents and warnings to set sail for Italy, and also of unhappiness at his betrayal of Didon with this news. The ghosts of Priam, Chorèbe, Hector and Cassandre appear and relentlessly urge Énée to proceed on to Italy. Énée gives in and realizes that he must obey the gods' commands, but also realizes his cruelty and ingratitude to Didon as a result. He then orders his comrades to prepare to sail that very morning, before sunrise.

Didon then appears, appalled at Énée's attempt to leave in secret, but still in love with him. Énée pleads the messages from the gods to move on, but Didon will have none of this. She pronounces a curse on him as she leaves. The Trojans shout "Italie!".

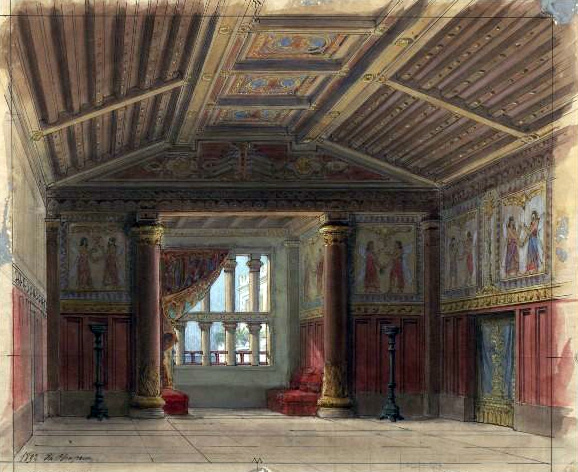
Didon's apartment (1863)

Scene 2: Didon's apartment at dawn

Didon asks Anna to plead with Énée one last time to stay. Anna acknowledges blame for encouraging the love between her sister and Énée. Didon angrily counters that if Énée truly loved her, he would defy the gods, but then asks her to plead with him for a few days' additional stay.

The crowd has seen the Trojans set sail. Iopas conveys the news to Didon. In a rage, she demands that the Carthaginians give chase and destroy the Trojans' fleet, and wishes that she had destroyed the Trojans upon their arrival. She then decides to offer sacrifice, including destroying the Trojans' gifts to her and hers to them. Narbal is worried about Didon and tells Anna to stay with her sister, but the queen orders Anna to leave.

Alone, she resolves to die, and after expressing her love for Énée one final time, prepares to bid her city and her people farewell.

Scene 3: The palace gardens

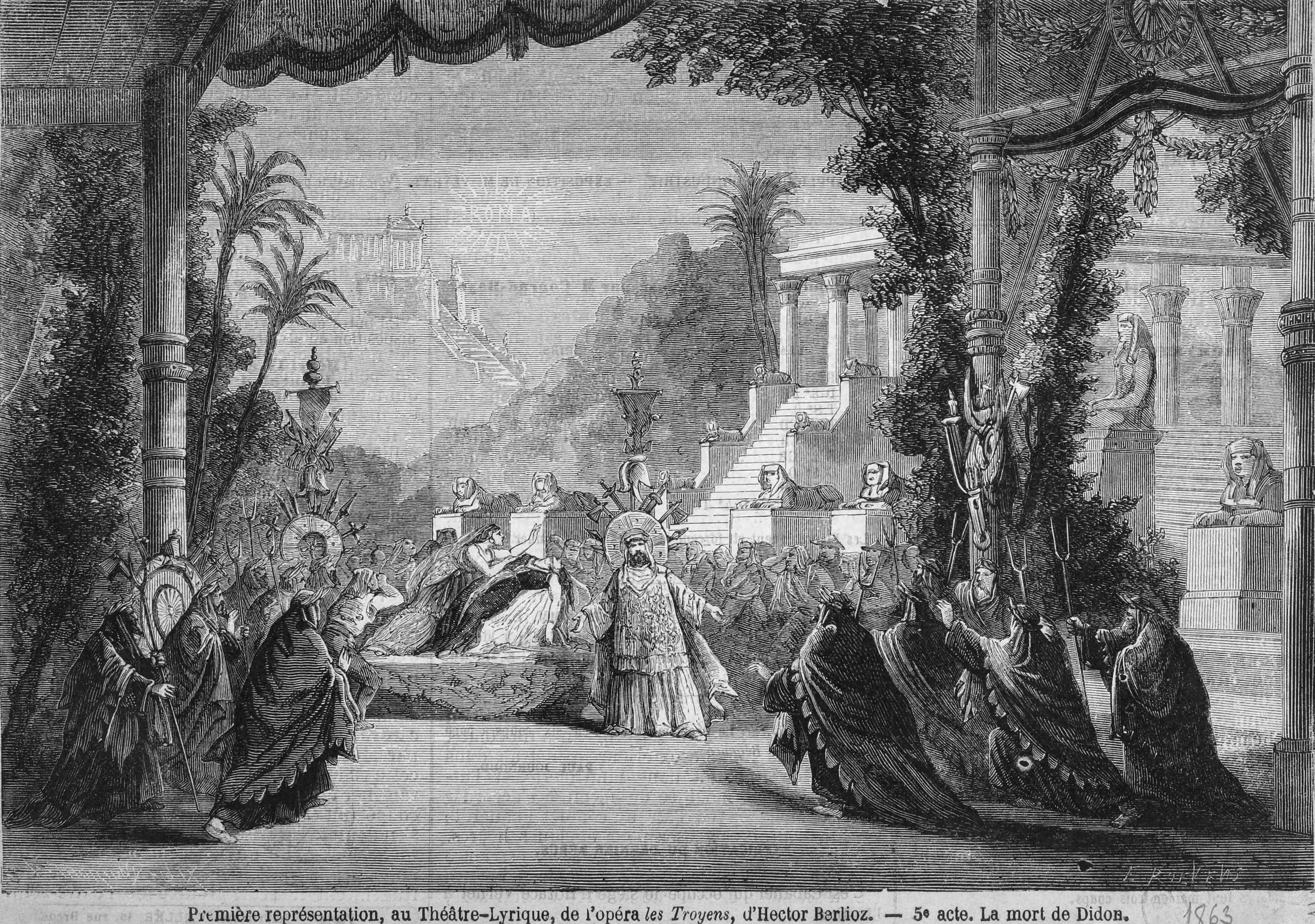
Press illustration of the last scene – the Death of Didon (1863). Set designer: Philippe Chaperon

A sacrificial pyre with Énée's relics has been built. Priests enter in a procession. Narbal and Anna expound curses on Énée to suffer a humiliating death in battle. Didon says it is time to finish the sacrifice and that she feels peace enter her heart (this happens in a ghostly descending chromatic line recalling the appearance of Hector's ghost in Act II). She then ascends the pyre. She removes her veil and throws it on Énée's toga. She has a vision of a future African warrior, Hannibal, who will rise and attack Rome to avenge her.

Didon then stabs herself with Énée's sword, to the horror of her people. But at the moment of her death, she has one last vision: Carthage will be destroyed, and Rome will be "immortal". The Carthaginians then utter one final curse on Énée and his people to the music of the Trojan march, vowing vengeance for his abandonment of Didon, as the opera ends.

== Musical numbers ==
The list of musical numbers is from the Urtext vocal score.

=== Act 1 ===
- No. 1. Chœur: "Après dix ans" (Chœur de la Populace troyenne)
- No. 2. Récitatif et Air: "Les Grecs ont disparu" (Cassandre)
- No. 3. Duo: "Quand Troie éclate" (Cassandre, Chorèbe)
- No. 4. Marche et Hymne: "Dieux protecteurs" (Chœur)
- No. 5. Combat de Ceste – Pas de Lutteurs
- No. 6. Pantomime: "Andromaque et son fils" (Andromaque, Astyanax, Cassandre, Chœur)
- No. 7. Récit: "Du peuple et des soldats" (Énée)
- No. 8. Ottetto et Double Chœur: "Châtiment effroyable" (Ascagne, Cassandre, Hécube, Énée, Helenus, Chorèbe, Panthée, Priam, Chœur)
- No. 9. Récitatif et Chœur: "Que la déesse nous protège" (the same)
- No. 10. Air: "Non, je ne verrai pas" (Cassandre)
- No. 11. Final: Marche Troyenne (Cassandre, Chœur)

=== Act 2 ===
First Tableau:

- No. 12. Scène et Récitatif: "Ô lumière de Troie" (Ascagne, Énée, l'Ombre d'Hector)
- No. 13. Récitatif et Chœur: "Quelle espérance encore" (Ascagne, Énée, Chorèbe, Panthée, Chœur des Soldats troyens)

Second Tableau:

- No. 14. Chœur – Prière: "Puissante Cybèle" (Polyxène, Chœur des Troyennes)
- No. 15. Récitatif et Chœur: "Tous ne périront pas" (Cassandre, Polyxène, Chœur)
- No. 16. Final: "Complices de sa gloire" (the same, un Chef Grec, Chœur des Grecs)

=== Act 3 ===
- No. 17. Chœur: "De Carthage les cieux" (Chœur du Peuple carthaginois)
- No. 18. Chant National: "Gloire à Didon" (the same)
- No. 19. Récitatif et Air: "Nous avons vu finir" (Didon, the same)
- No. 20. Entrée des Constructeurs
- No. 21. Entrée des Matelots
- No. 22. Entrée des Laboureurs
- No. 23. Récitatif et Chœur: "Peuple! tous les honneurs" (Didon, Chœur)
- No. 24. Duo: "Les chants joyeux" (Didon, Anna)
- No. 25. Récitatif et Air: "Échappés à grand' peine" (Iopas, Didon)
- No. 26. Marche Troyenne (in the minor mode): "J'éprouve une soudaine" (Didon)
- No. 27. Récitatif: "Auguste Reine" (Ascagne, Didon, Panthée)
- No. 28. Final: "J'ose à peine annoncer" (Ascagne, Didon, Anna, Iopas, Énée, Narbal, Panthée, Chœur)

=== Act 4 ===
First Tableau:

- No. 29. Chasse Royale et Orage – Pantomime (Chœur des Nymphes, Sylvains, Faunes)

Second Tableau:

- No. 30. Récitatif: "Dites, Narbal" (Anna, Narbal)
- No. 31. Air et Duo: "De quels revers" (the same)
- No. 32. Marche pour l'Entrée de la Reine
- No. 33. Ballets:
  a) Pas des Almées
  b) Danse des Esclaves
  c) Pas d'Esclaves Nubiennes
- No. 34. Scène et Chant d'Iopas: "Assez, ma sœur" (Didon, Iopas)
- No. 35. Récitatif et Quintette: "Pardonne, Iopas" (Didon, Anna, Énée, Iopas, Narbal)
- No. 36. Récitatif et Septuor: "Mais banissons" (Ascagnes, Didon, Anna, Énée, Iopas, Narbal, Panthée, Chœur)
- No. 37. Duo: "Nuit d'ivresse" (Didon, Énée, Mercure)

=== Act 5 ===
First Tableau:

- No. 38. Chanson d'Hylas: "Vallon sonore" (Hylas, 2 Sentinelles)
- No. 39. Récitatif et Chœur: "Préparez tout" (Panthée, Chefs troyens)
- No. 40. Duo: "Par Bacchus" (2 Sentinelles)
- No. 41. Récitatif mesuré et Air: "Inutiles regrets" / "Ah! quand viendra l'instant" (Énée)
- No. 42. Scène: "Énée!" (Énée, le Spectre de Cassandre, le Spectre d'Hector, le Spectre de Chorèbe, le Spectre de Priam, Chœur d'Ombres invisibles)
- No. 43. Scène et Chœur: "Debout, Troyens!" (Énée, Chœur)
- No. 44. Duo et Chœur: "Errante sur tes pas" (Didon, Énée, Chœur)

Second Tableau:

- No. 45. Scène: "Va, ma sœur" (Didon, Anna)
- No. 46. Scène: "En mer, voyez" (Didon, Iopas, Chœur)
- No. 47. Monologue: "Je vais mourir" (Didon)
- No. 48. Air: "Adieu, fière cité" (Didon)

Third Tableau:

- No. 49. Cérémonie Funèbre: "Dieux de l'oubli" (Anna, Narbal, Chœur de Prêtres de Pluton)
- No. 50. Scène: "Pluton semble" (Didon)
- No. 51. Chœur: "Au secours!" (Didon, Anna, Narbal, Chœur)
- No. 52. Imprécation: "Rome! Rome!" (the same)

=== Supplement ===
- La scène de Sinon
- The original finale of Act 5
