= Edmond Cabel =

French operatic tenor

Edmond Cabel (18 November 1832 – December 1888) was a French operatic tenor.

He was born Edmond-Antoine-Auguste Dreulette in Namur. He was the brother of the famous coloratura soprano Marie Cabel and adopted her married name Cabu (and later, the family's stage name Cabel).

He studied singing at the Conservatoire de Paris, and on 22 April 1855 sang Jacob (Isacco) in a student performance of the first two acts of Rossini's La pie voleuse (as adapted into French by Castil-Blaze) and on 29 June, Artémidore in the first three acts of Gluck's Armide (both under Jules Pasdeloup as the conductor), and won a second prize in opéra comique for 1855.

From 1856 to 1859 he sang at the Théatre de l'Opéra-Comique in Paris.

At the Théâtre Lyrique he sang André in a revival of Gretry's L'épreuve villageoise on 11 September 1863. He also created the role of Hylas in Berlioz' Les Troyens à Carthage on 4 November 1863, although his part was cut early in the run, since he was concurrently appearing in a revival of Félicien David's La perle du Brésil at the same theatre, and would have had to be paid 200 francs extra for each appearance exceeding his contractual limit of 15 per month.

From 1871 to 1872 he appeared at the Théâtre de la Monnaie in Brussels. He died in Brussels.
