= Cable (foreign exchange) =

Slang term for GBP/USD exchange rate

The term cable is a slang term used by foreign exchange traders to refer to the exchange rate between the pound sterling and US dollar. The term originated in the mid-19th century, when the exchange rate between the US dollar and sterling began to be transmitted across the Atlantic by a submarine communications cable.

The first Transatlantic Cable was laid under the Atlantic Ocean in 1858, but it failed after only about a month of fitful service. The first truly successful cable across the Atlantic was completed in July 1866, reliably transmitting currency prices between the London and New York City Exchanges. The first such exchange rate to be published in The Times appeared in their issue of 10 August 1866.

Transatlantic communications are now mainly carried by optical fibre cables, supplemented to a small degree by satellites, but forex traders' nickname for the sterling/dollar pair still harks back to the old days of copper telegraph cables.
