= Iopas =

Fictional bard

In Virgil's Aeneid, Iopas is a bard at the court of Dido. He is featured at the end of Book 1, where he performs the "Song of Iopas", a creation narrative, during a banquet hosted for Aeneas and his Trojans.

== Text, context ==
The passage in Virgil:

...cithara crinitus Iopas
personat aurata, docuit quem maximus Atlas.
hic canit errantem lunam solisque labores,
unde hominum genus et pecudes, unde imber et ignes,
Arcturum pluuiasque Hyadas geminosque Triones,
quid tantum Oceano properent se tingere soles
hiberni, uel quae tardis mora noctibus obstet

A student of Atlas, the maestro,
Livens the air with his gilded harp. For the long-haired Iopas
Sings of the unpredictable moon, of the sun and its labours,
Origins human and animal, causes of fire and of moisture,
Stars (Lesser, Greater Bear, rainy Hyades, also Arcturus),
Why in the winter the sun so hurries to dive in the Ocean,
What slows winter's lingering nights, what blocks and delays them. (Tr. Frederick Ahl)

Christine G. Perkell notes that Iopas's song employs "commonplaces of the didactic genre," contrasting with the heroic songs typically expected from court poets like Phemius or Demodocus in the Odyssey. The content of Iopas's song shows resemblances to works such as Lucretius's De Rerum Natura, Hesiod's Works and Days, and Virgil's own Georgics.

== Interpretation ==
Numerous interpretations have been proposed for Iopas's song. Eve Adler, for instance, highlights how the Trojans at the banquet delay their applause until the Carthaginians have first expressed appreciation for the song. Adler observes that Iopas's naturalistic account of the cosmos, which requires no divine intervention, appears surprising to the Trojans. She suggests this passage is foreshadowed in Virgil's Georgics (at the end of Book 2 and beginning of Book 3), interpreting Iopas as a figure akin to Lucretius, whose perspective Virgil ultimately critiques. Timothy Power, on the other hand, proposes that Iopas is meant to evoke King Juba II of Numidia, a noted scholar associated with the Augustan era.
