= William Cabell =

William Cabell may refer to:

- William Cabell (physician) (1700–1774), notable figure in 18th century Warminster, Virginia
- William Cabell (American Revolution) (1730–1798), Virginia state official during the American Revolution
- William H. Cabell (1772–1853), Governor of Virginia
- William Lewis Cabell (1827–1911), Confederate general and mayor of Dallas
