= James Ray Cable =

American serial killer and rapist (1948–2013)

- Born: 1948; La Grange, Kentucky, U.S.
- Died: December 3, 2013 (aged 64–65); Kentucky State Penitentiary, Eddyville, Kentucky, U.S.
- Convictions: First-degree manslaughter; Kidnapping; First-degree rape; First degree sodomy; Rape of a child under the age of 12; Being a persistent felony offender in the first degree
- Penalty: 300 years imprisonment

Details
- Victims: 4–6+
- Span of crimes: 1977–1990
- Country: United States
- State: Kentucky
- Date apprehended: For the final time on April 26, 1990

James Ray Cable (1948 – December 3, 2013) was an American serial killer and rapist who, from 1977 to 1989, killed at least one man and three women in the state of Kentucky.

== First murder ==
Little is known about Cable's childhood. Born in La Grange, Kentucky in 1948, he was first arrested in 1971, on accusations of raping a 7-year-old girl in Owensboro. Later that year a jury convicted and sentenced him to life imprisonment. Just under a year later, on June 11, 1972, Cable escaped from the Kentucky State Reformatory but was caught later that same day, leading to his receiving an escape conviction.

In April 1977, 35-year-old Willie S. Daniels, who was serving a life sentence for manslaughter and two counts of robbery, was attacked by Cable in the prison's gym. Cable proceeded to strike Daniels with a steel rod across his head. Daniels was rushed to the prison's hospital where he died as a result of his injuries. Cable was convicted of first degree manslaughter the following year and had 10 years added to his sentence.

== Release and kidnapping conviction ==
Three years later, Cable was paroled. In 1983, Cable was returned to prison for violating his parole. He was once again released in early 1986. In 1988, he returned to prison for violating a court order prohibiting contact with his estranged wife.

On April 5, 1990, Cable, along with accomplice Phillip Clopton, kidnapped a 15-year-old Louisville girl. They drove her to a campsite deep into the woods, where they both raped her before tying her to a tree. Cable briefly left the area to meet with his parole officer while Clopton stayed. Over the next three weeks, both would continuously rape, whip, and assault the girl. On April 26, Clopton was alone with the girl but forgot to chain her up, leading to her stealing his gun, shooting and killing him, and running away. She escaped the woods and alerted authorities, leading to Cable's arrest.

The girl told authorities that Cable and Clopton had confessed to killing teens Sherry Wilson and Bridgett Allen, both 14 and missing since January 25. After Clopton's death, his diary was searched, and it was found to contain evidence of Cable's confessing to him that he killed Helen Booth, 24, in 1989. It also linked Cable to a severed arm that had been found that March. At the time, Cable could not be conclusively linked to the murder; however, he was convicted and sentenced to 300 years in prison on the kidnapping and rape charges.

== Implication in other murders ==
In December 2003, DNA tests were carried out to attempt to link Cable to any unsolved crimes. When the tests were complete the following year, Cable was linked to, and subsequently charged with, three murders from the 1980s. The first of these to occur was Sandra Kellems, who, on June 8, 1982, was celebrating her 18th birthday. She decided to go to a friend's house in Owensboro but never arrived. The following day, her body was found under several trees and bushes. She had been sexually assaulted and killed by blows to the head with a brick. Her purse was not found in her possession. At the crime scene, police made plaster casts of footprints found in the area. The second of these was Oma Marie Bird, 26. On December 11, 1986, her body was found in an alleyway by two children walking to school. The final of these was the murder of Helen Booth, 24, a crime for which Cable had originally been considered a suspect. On May 11, 1989, her body was found in Riverside Park. Booth, who was pregnant, had been raped, gagged, and bludgeoned to death.

The Kellems and the Bird murder cases were reopened in 2001. Investigators in both cases began comparing notes and discovered that Cable had been in and out of prison during the time the murders were committed. Investigators began talking to him, collected his DNA, and matched it to that left at the crime scenes. Following this breakthrough, prosecutors sought the death penalty if Cable were to be convicted.

Cable was found competent to stand trial. However, in 2011, questions were raised about Cable receiving a death sentence due to his IQ of 70. He subsequently died in prison on December 3, 2013, before ever going to trial. He never confessed to the murders despite DNA evidence proving he was responsible beyond a reasonable doubt.

== See also ==
- List of serial killers in the United States
