= Kabel (disambiguation) =

Kabel may refer to:

- Kabel (Haarlemmermeer), a hamlet in the Netherlands
- Kabel (Heerhugowaard), a hamlet in the Netherlands
- Kabel (typeface)
