= Marie Cabel =

Belgian coloratura soprano (1827–1885)

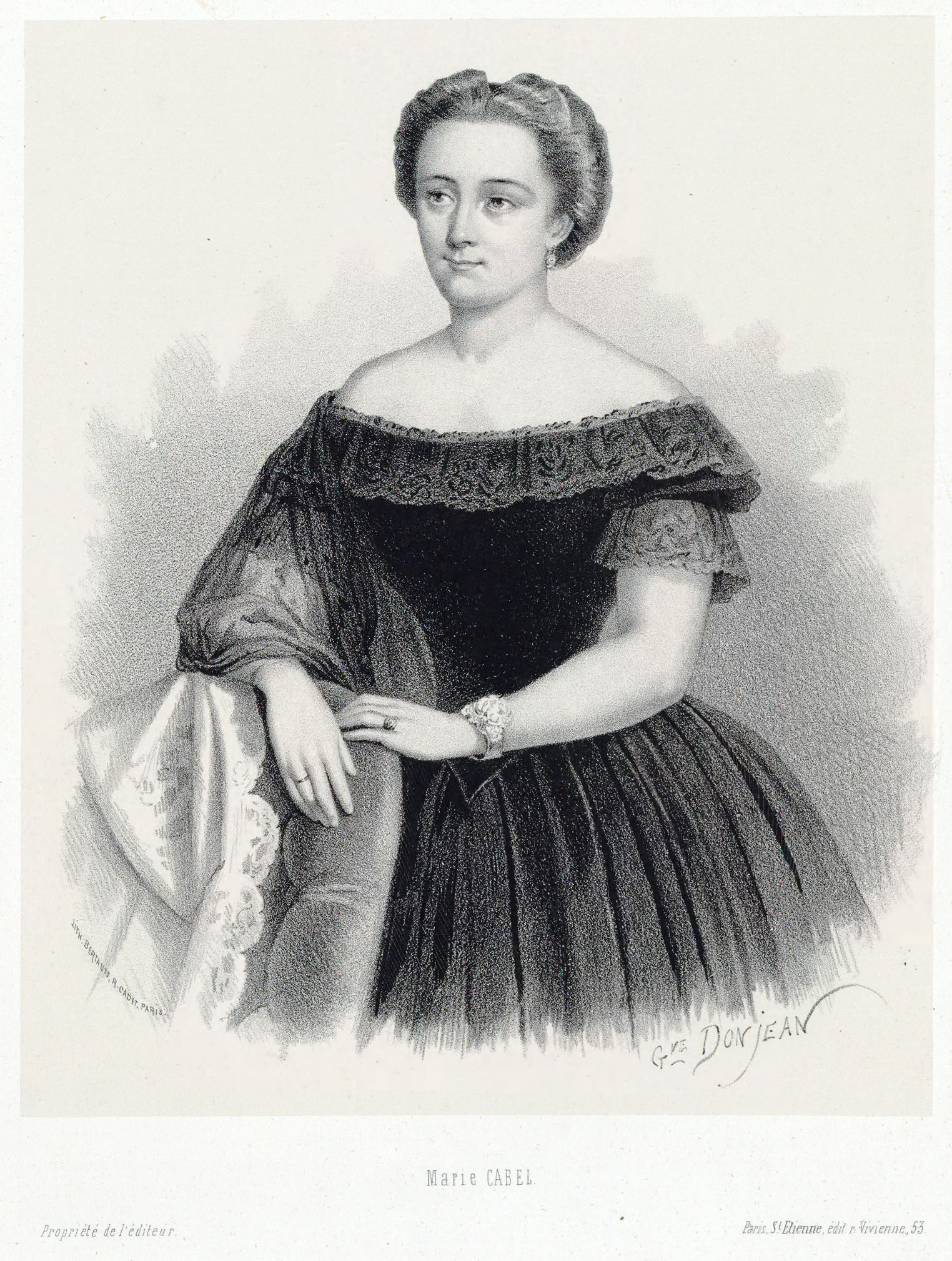
- Cabel in 1850
- Born: Marie-Josèphe Dreulette; 31 January 1827; Liège
- Died: 23 May 1885 (aged 58); Maisons-Laffitte, France
- Occupation: Operatic soprano
- Organizations: Théâtre Lyrique; Opéra-Comique

Marie Cabel (31 January 1827 – 23 May 1885) was a Belgian coloratura soprano. She is probably best remembered for having created the role of Philine in Ambroise Thomas's opera Mignon.

== Biography ==
=== Early life and career ===
Born Marie-Josèphe Dreulette in Liège, she was the daughter of a former cavalry officer in Napoleon's army, who after his discharge had become an accountant for various theatres in Belgium. Pauline Viardot, who at that time lived in a chateau near Brussels, happened to hear Cabel sing as a child and predicted a great future for her. Cabel first studied voice in Liège with Bouillon, and, her father having died, gave music lessons to help support her mother. Cabel's younger brother Edmond also became a singer and in 1863 created the role of Hylas in Hector Berlioz's Les Troyens.

Cabel later studied voice in Brussels with Ferdinand Cabel and Louis-Joseph Cabel. In 1847 she married Georges Cabel, the brother of Louis-Joseph and also a voice teacher. As the marriage was unhappy, they soon separated and ultimately divorced. That same year she gave a concert in Paris and continued her studies at the Conservatoire de Paris in 1848–1849.

Cabel made her operatic debut in Paris at the Château des Fleurs in 1848, and in 1849 sang the roles of Georgette in Halévy's Le val d'Andorre and Athénaïs in Halévy's Les mousquetaires de la reine at the Opéra-Comique, where she went almost unnoticed. Moving back to Brussels, she sang at the Théâtre de la Monnaie from 1850 to 1853 with greater success. In 1852 she also appeared in Lyon, at a salary of 3,000 francs per month, and the following year in Strasbourg and Geneva.

=== At the Théâtre Lyrique ===
==== Jules Seveste ====
It was in Lyon that she was discovered by Jules Seveste, the director of the Théâtre Lyrique in Paris. Seveste engaged her for the 1853–1854 season at his theatre, where she made her debut creating the role of Toinon in Adolphe Adam's Le bijou perdu on 6 October 1853. Fétis described her as "young, fresh, winsome, cheerful, having the devil of a body, lacking at the time taste and musical style, but blessed with an adorable voice, of a marvelous purity, whose brilliant and silvery timbre produced an amazing effect on the public, with which she launched the most difficult lines with amazing confidence and assurance…" Georges Bousquet, writing in the Revue et Gazette Musicale of 9 October 1853, reported that the hit of the show was Cabel's performance of the aria "Ah! qu'il fait donc bon cueillir la fraise". She became such a popular star that the company, located in the working class district of the Boulevard du Temple, began to attract a well-heeled audience, including Emperor Napoleon III and his new bride Eugénie de Montijo.

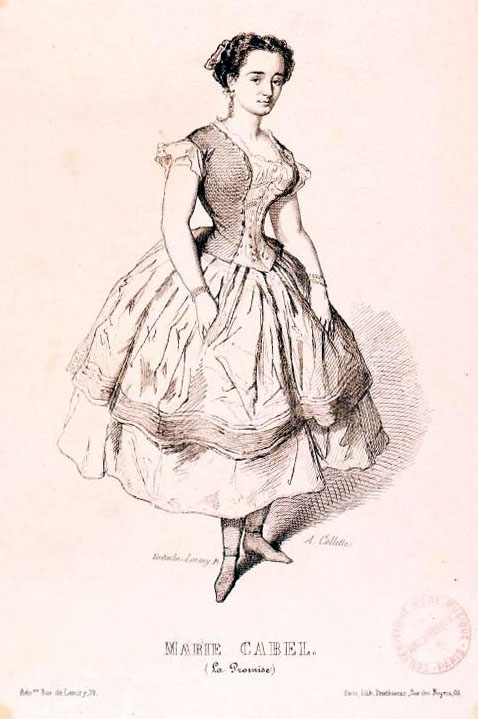
Cabel as Marie in Clapisson's La promise

Cabel continued singing at the Théâtre Lyrique, creating the roles of Corbin in François-Auguste Gevaert's Georgette ou Le moulin de Fontneoy (28 November 1853) and Marie in Louis Clapisson's La promise (16 March 1854). The Musical World of 25 March 1854 suggested that "although not a work of the first class, it [La promise] will probably have a run, owing to the manner in which the principal part is sustained by Mlle Marie Cabel…." This proved to be true, as it was performed a total of 60 times, that season and the next. Near the end of the season in May, Cabel was on leave and appeared in Bordeaux and Nantes, but was announced, and may have returned, for a benefit performance of La promise at the Théâtre Lyrique on 1 June.

==== London – Summer of 1854 ====
After the season in Paris was over, during the summer break, a contingent of the company led by Lafont went to London's St James's Theatre. The London company was not officially the Théâtre Lyrique, as Seveste had refused to take part and remained in France in order to prepare for the fall season in Paris. This distinction was generally ignored by the press, however. The London contingent presented a two-month season at St James's, which opened with Cabel singing in Le bijou perdu. The Illustrated London News (10 June 1854) opined that the opera was "exceedingly immoral—a thing of no importance in Paris, but not yet disregarded, we trust, in London." Cabel also appeared as Catarina in Daniel Auber's Les diamants de la couronne and Marie in Donizetti's La fille du régiment. The Musical World (29 July 1854) reported in detail on Cabel's performances:

In spite of intense heat of the weather, which has helped mightily to thin most of the London theatres, the St. James's has been attended by fashionable audiences every evening on which the charming and fascinating Marie Cabel has appeared. The Diamants de la Couronne has proved the most attractive opera produced by the company of the Théâtre Lyrique, and, independently of the superiority of Auber's music to that of any other composer whose work has been produced, we do not hesitate to say that Madame Marie Cabel's Caterina is the most striking and interesting character in which she has appeared in London. Perhaps it was because it was the last, and consequently made the deepest impression. The fair artist, however, could hardly be of that opinion; since, on the occasion of her benefit, Wednesday last, she selected La Fille du Régiment in preference to Les Diamants de la Couronne. After all it is a mere matter of choice whether Madame Cabel's Caterina or Maria is preferable. Many doubtless think the former, having no other reason than that they like the music of Auber better than the music of Donizetti.

Mad. Marie Cabel was welcomed by an audience of true devotees on Wednesday night. The hot weather seemed to have no effect upon her voice, unless it was to render it still more soft and flexible. If Jenny Lind be entitled to be called the "Nightingale", and Alboni the "Thrush", surely, without any stretch of metaphor, Marie Cabel may be called the "Lark". No lark, indeed, could sing more sweetly, or pour forth its unpremeditated lay more joyously than she on Wednesday night. Her singing was the very exhilaration of pleasant sounds, and her acting perfection, both as the Vivandière in costume and the Vivandière out of costume, as the daughter of the regiment, and as the daughter of her newly-found mother. In the second act Madame Cabel introduced the scene from M. Adolphe Adam's Taureador, in which the variations on "Ah! vous dirai-je, maman" were introduced. This was one of the most finished and brilliant displays of bravura singing to which we have listened for a long time, and was a genuine triumph for Madame Cabel, who was ably supported by MM. Legrand and Louis Cabel in the two male parts. Madame Cabel was re-called at the end of the opera, received with enthusiastic applause, and honoured with a shower of bouquets.

The success of the company in London was somewhat tarnished, however, as Jules Seveste had died unexpectedly on 30 June in Meudon.

==== Émile Perrin ====
Émile Perrin took over as director of the Théâtre Lyrique on 26 July 1854, while retaining his position as the director of the Opéra-Comique as well. Marie Cabel had been under contract to Seveste and was now free to go elsewhere, but Perrin was able to persuade her to sign a five-year contract with him for 40,000 francs per year and three months annual leave. The new season opened with Cabel in La promise.

Adolphe Adam had recently written two new works for Perrin, Le dernier bal for the Opéra-Comique and the 3-act opéra-comique Le muletier de Tolède for the Théâtre Lyrique. It was thought that producing both works at the same time would cause jealousies to arise, so Adam was given a choice of one or the other. Since he had written Le muletier for Cabel, he did not have to think twice. The opera premiered on 16 December 1854 with Cabel in the leading soprano role of Elvire, and although it is often considered to be one of Adam's weakest works, it turned out to be one of Perrin's more successful new productions at the theatre, receiving 54 performances that year and the next. Its ephemeral success can be attributed almost entirely to Cabel. As The Musical World (30 December 1854) enthused, she was "neatly bound as to the feet in the very jauntiest little morocco boots…. She is the fauvette of the boulevards, the very sweetest of warblers; and her acting is quite equal to her singing."

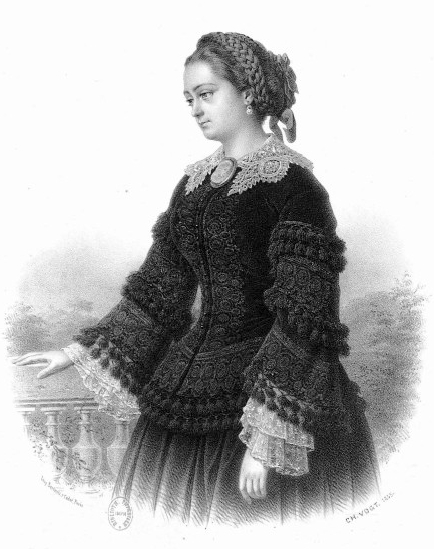
Marie Cabel in 1855

Later in the season, after a series of lackluster productions by Perrin (with the exception of a highly adapted revival of Weber's Der Freischütz called Robin des Bois on 24 January 1855), Cabel created the role of Jaguarita in Halévy's Jaguarita l'Indienne (14 May 1855). This production was even more successful than Le multier and was performed a total of 124 times by the company. Cabel did receive some criticism in The Musical World (26 May 1855) for her appearance in this role: "She is chief of a Red Indian community, and she alone appears as a pale-face. She is queen of the savages, and her costume is too suggestive of a Parisian modiste. Some red ochre would be well applied…."

During the summer break Cabel went to Baden-Baden, but returned to open the 1855–1856 season on 1 September in Jaguarita. It had already been announced the previous April that Perrin was leaving his position as director, and he did so on 29 September.

==== Charles Réty ====
Cabel, being under contract with Perrin, followed him to the Opéra-Comique, but returned to the Théâtre Lyrique for the 1861–1862 season, when the company was under the direction of Charles Réty. She appeared in revivals of Le bijou perdu in September and Jaguarita in November. Of the former The Musical World (14 September 1861) reported that "the house was crowded and the reception of the brilliant songstress was of the most enthusiastic description." By the time of Jaguarita, however the same journal (30 November 1861) complained that "such perverted productions as these, in which the voice is treated as an instrument of brass or wood, intended to obey merely mechanical impulses rather than the grand and noble organ of human emotion, have ruined all the best singers whom France has recently produced, and by all who have any regard for pure art, ought to be energetically reprobated." Walsh remarks that when Cabel had left the Théâtre Lyrique, she had been replaced by Caroline Miolan-Carvalho "who seems to have refined public taste in singing."

Later that season on 18 March 1862 Cabel appeared to great acclaim as Féline in the premiere of Albert Grisar's 3-act opera La chatte merveilleuse (with a libretto based on a vaudeville by Eugène Scribe). The work received a total of 72 performances that year and the next and was the greatest success of Réty's directorship, but was never revived.

==== Léon Carvalho ====
The following season Léon Carvalho returned as director, replacing Réty, and on 30 October 1862 the company moved to its new house on the Place du Châtelet. Because Carvalho's appointment had been a surprise, his wife Caroline Carvalho had accepted other engagements and was unavailable for many of the starring roles. Cabel played hard to get, insisting on a fee of more than 6,000 francs per month. Presumably she got it, because she was singing again in La chatte merveilleuse on 31 October.

When Théophile Semet's new opera L'ondine, which premiered on 7 January 1863, did poorly, a replacement had to be quickly brought to the stage. This turned out to be Peines d'amour perdues, a reworking of Mozart's Così fan tutte in which Da Ponte's original libretto was replaced with one by Jules Barbier and Michel Carré which was based on Shakespeare's Love's Labour's Lost. The music was arranged by Prosper Pascal and Léo Delibes. Such drastic adaptations were not uncommon in the 19th century, especially in Germany, but also in France. Many of the newspaper critics who had caught wind of the preparations for this new production were aghast and were saying so. Le Ménestrel (8 February 1863) reported that their critic had been reassured by the company that Mozart's music would remain unaltered and his "work will not be disparaged by exchanging the glass beads of Da Ponte for a diamond of Shakespeare." The "revival" had its first performance on 31 March 1863, and Marie Cabel sang the role of Rosine (Dorabella in the original, although she also sang the new words to the music of Fiordiligi's aria "Per pietà"). Adolphe Deloffre was the conductor. Much of Mozart's music had been rearranged to fit the new plot, and the recitatives were replaced with spoken dialogue. Perhaps it is unsurprising that this production was only presented a total of 18 times. Cabel gave her last performance in it on 8 May and went to Marseille, relieving Miolan-Carvalho, who was then able to return to Paris and perform in Gounod's Faust. After this Cabel turned down Léon Carvalho's offer for the next season and decided to go to Lyon instead.

=== At the Opéra-Comique ===
After leaving the Théâtre Lyrique with Perrin to join the Opéra-Comique company at the end of 1855, Cabel's first creation was on 23 February 1856 in the title role of Daniel Auber's 3-act opera Manon Lescaut. The famous aria "Éclat de rire" ("Laughing Song") is said to have been created especially for her.

She also appeared in Meyerbeer's L'étoile du nord. Meyerbeer, who was trying to decide whether Cabel or Caroline Miolan-Carvalho was better suited for his new opera Le chercheur des trésors (later to be titled Le pardon de Ploërmel or Dinorah), attended some performances and recorded in his diary on 7 August 1857 that "Madame Cabel remained far below my expectations." By 31 October he found her "much better than before, without completely satisfying."

In the meantime, Cabel created the role of Sylvia in Ambroise Thomas' 3-act opéra-comique Le carnaval de Venise (first performed on 9 December 1857) in which she sang an elaborate vocalise. The Musical World (19 December 1857) wrote: "The execution of an air without words, imitating a 'concerto (!) for violin', as we are informed, was a prodigy of vocalisation."

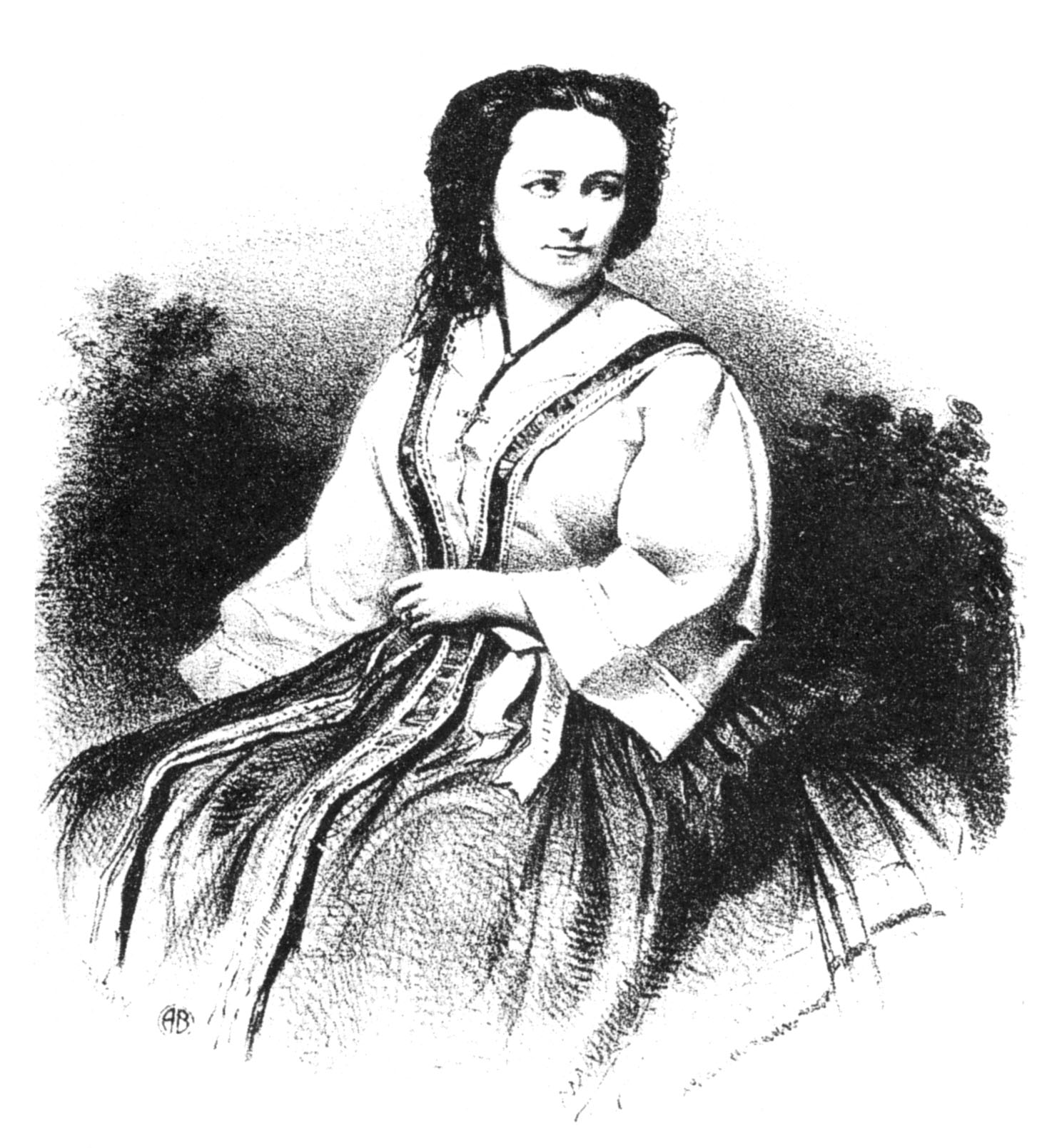
Cabel as Dinorah

By October 1858, Meyerbeer had apparently decided on Cabel as Dinorah, since no other more suitable singer was available, and was working with her on the part.

On 4 November 1858 Cabel created the leading soprano role in Eugène Gautier's La bacchante. Despite "the personal success won in it by Mme Cabel" (according to Clément and Larousse), this work received only 3 performances. Meyerbeer had found that "Madame Cabel's assumption of the title role was very ordinary."

The premiere of Meyerbeer's Le pardon de Ploermel was on 4 April 1859 with Cabel singing the role of Dinorah. At the end of the performance the calls for Meyerbeer were unending, and the Emperor and Empress summoned Meyerbeer to the Royal Box, where Marie Cabel was given the honor of placing a laurel wreath upon his head. Afterward Meyerbeer dared to write in his diary that he considered it "a brilliant success". The critics were also quite positive, and Cabel was praised for her "vertiginous-virtuoso portrayal of Dinorah."

Cabel created the role of Lise in François-Auguste Gevaert's Le chateau trompette on 23 April 1860. This piece received a total of 25 performances. On 28 May 1866 she appeared in the premiere of Friedrich von Flotow's 2-act opéra-comique Zilda, which received 23 performances. Cabel's other appearances at the Opéra-Comique included revivals of Auber's L'ambassadrice, Victor Massé's Galathée, and Thomas's Le songe d'une nuit d'été.

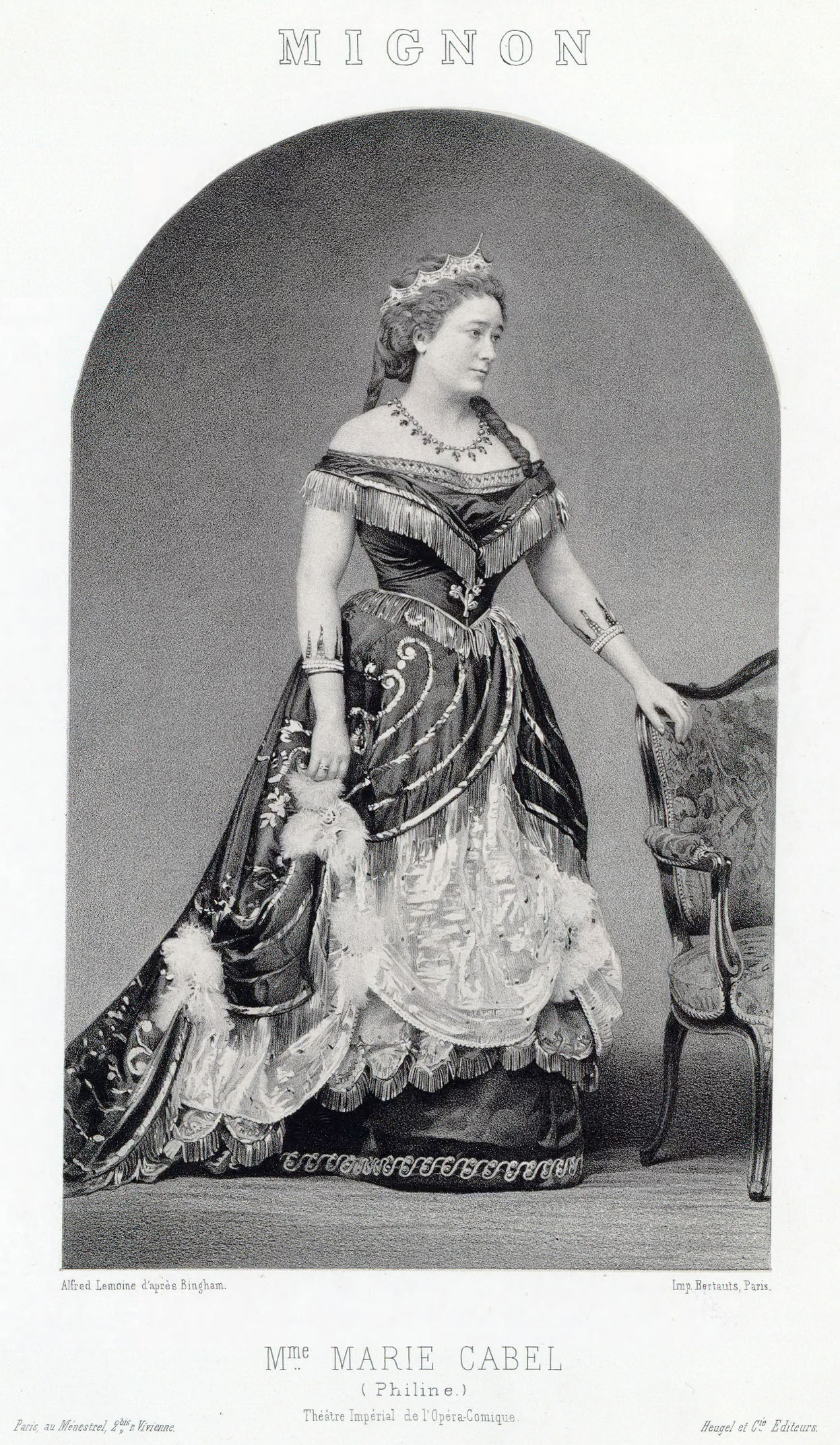
Cabel as Philine

One her most important creations was on 17 November 1866, when she sang Philine in Thomas's 3-act opera Mignon. Philine's polonaise in the garden scene, "Je suis Titania la blonde", was written for Cabel at her request. Eugène Ritt, the director of the Opéra-Comique from 1862 to 1870, later recalled: "Marie Cabel, who was playing Philine, asked Thomas to write her a grand aria in the garden scene. He regretfully did so." Yet Cabel received high praise for her singing of it. The Musical World wrote of a performance later that season: "The other female part was intrusted to Madame Marie Cabel, long one of the most distinguished favourites of the Opéra-Comique school. It would be a matter of some difficulty to speak too highly of this most accomplished singer. Madame Cabel is no longer young; but she is still a very handsome woman, retaining full possession of her powers, and her vocalization is marked by a grace and fluency which have been rarely equalled, and possibly never surpassed. There would be something almost audacious in the fearlessness with which she dashes off her ascending scales and roulades, were it not for the ease and unconsciousness of difficulty with which she executes them; one scarcely knows which to admire most in her singing—its perfect finish or entire absence of effort. Her execution of the air, 'Je suis Titania', a brilliant and enormously difficult polonaise, was unquestionably the greatest success achieved during the night."

Cabel's last creation at the theatre was Hélène in one of Auber's last operas, the 3-act Le premier jour de bonheur (15 February 1868). This work was also successful being given 175 times up to 1873.

=== Final years ===
In the following years Cabel made guest appearances in the French provinces and Belgium. She also appeared in concerts in London in 1871. In May and June 1872 she starred in a season of French opera at London's Opéra-Comique in the Strand, under the management of a Sgr Montelli. Works performed included Donizetti's La fille du régiment, Boieldieu's La dame blanche, and Auber's L'ambassadrice. She retired in 1877 due to increasing signs of mental derangement, and was eventually confined to an asylum. She died in Maisons-Laffitte.
