= Mary Barnes Cabell =

American freedwoman (1815–1900)

- Born: February 1815; Virginia
- Died: June 11, 1900 (aged 85); Union, West Virginia
- Other name: Mary Barnes

Mary Barnes Cabell (February 1815 – June 11, 1900) was an American freedwoman who enabled the foundation of Institute, West Virginia. Her story was dramatized in a movie in 2020 called River of Hope.

Cabell, born Mary Barnes, was born enslaved in 1815 and was purchased by bachelor farmer Samuel I. Cabell in Virginia. They lived on land that later became Kanawha County, West Virginia that Cabell had purchased from the heirs of Martha Washington in 1853. She had thirteen children fathered by Cabell. Cabell wrote several wills specifically freeing Mary Barnes, and stating that her children "always have been free." In 1858, Cabell officially freed Mary and all their children. Cabell's minor children were privately educated in Ohio since there were no educational opportunities for them in Virginia due to racist policies, but some returned to the state.

One of Cabell's wills also decreed that all his personal wealth divided between Mary Barnes and her children. He was murdered on July 18, 1865. While the rumors of the time said that his murder was because of "white resentment toward his integrated family life," that has never been substantiated and no one was convicted of the crime. Mary Barnes petitioned the county commissioners in 1869 to change her and her children's last name to Cabell. In 1870, the Cabell land was divided among Mary Barnes Cabell and her children. In 1871, the Cabell estate was reported to be worth $42,128, equivalent to $1,132,190 in 2025.

In 1891, because of the Morrill Land-Grant Acts saying certain benefits would be denied to states that did not educate Black people, the West Virginia Legislature passed an act creating the "West Virginia Colored Institute," a high school for Black students. The Cabell lands, first known as Cabell Farm and later Pinety Grove, were deemed attractive by Governor Aretas B. Fleming. Mary Cabell's daughter Marina sold the state a 30-acre tract for $2,250. This, along with other lots, gradually became the 80-acre campus. The town the land was on was named Institute. The school became West Virginia State University and as of the late 1990s many Cabell descendants serve there as faculty and staff.

Mary Barnes Cabell died in 1900 and is buried in the Cabell family cemetery alongside Samuel I. Cabell.
