= Samuel I. Cabell =

Virginia plantation owner (1802–1865)

Samuel J. Cabell
- Born: 1802; U.S.
- Died: July 18, 1865; Kanawha County, West Virginia
- Occupation: plantation owner
- Known for: murder victim, possibly because of interracial marriage; plantation became West Virginia State University

Samuel I. Cabell (1802 – July 18, 1865) was a wealthy Virginia plantation owner in the Kanawha River valley who may have been murdered for marrying one of his former slaves and providing for their descendants. Although seven white men were acquitted of crime, his will was honored and his descendants went on to lead productive lives. Part of his former plantation approximately nine miles west of what soon became the new state capital at Charleston, West Virginia, became West Virginia State University, a historically black college.

== Early life ==
Prior to 1830, Samuel I. Cabell, moved to the Kanawha River valley from Clarke County, Georgia, where his father Robert Jones Cabell had died in 1823 (although Samuel's death record says he was born in Georgia, the 1850 Census says he was born in Virginia).

Samuel's father Robert Jones Cabell was the son of Col. John Cabell's second wife Mrs. Elizabeth Jones, who he married in 1797 when Robert was about fifteen. By an Act of the Virginia General Assembly, Elizabeth secured a share of her fiancee Robert Williams' estate. He died five months before her son Robert was born. Soon afterward she married a Mr. Jones. Elizabeth died in 1802, and Col. Cabell adopted Robert Jones, referring to him in his will as "Robert Jones Cabell".

Robert J. Cabell married Samuel's mother Betsy Reid in Bedford County, Virginia in 1803. She died before Robert married his next wife Ann Billups in Clarke County, Georgia in 1809.

Randolph W. Cabell, the most recent of Cabell family genealogists correctly deduced that the West Virginia Cabells are descendants (by adoption and naturally) of Col. John Cabell (1735–1815), who served in the Virginia General Assembly. Col. John married Paulina Jordan in 1761. Records concerning his descendants were destroyed in a fire at the Buckingham County courthouse, but his will was discovered in the mid-1970s. Col. John Cabell would have two additional wives, raising an "unnamed son" (Robert J. Cabell, alias "Robert Jones") of his second wife Elizabeth Brierton Jones, and having at least Alexander A Cabell and Napoleon Bonaparte Cabell with his third wife (the former Frances Johnson). Col. John Cabell's son by his first wife, Samuel Jordan Cabell (1776–1854) lived most of his life in Monroe County (which became part of West Virginia during the American Civil War) before moving westward and dying in Green County, Kentucky.

Another of Col. John Cabell's sons Dr. John J. Cabell (1772–1834) lived mostly in Lynchburg, Virginia (one of the gateways westward across the Appalachian Mountains) and may have inherited an independent streak from his non-emigrant grandfather, the dissenter Nicholas Cabell, for he converted to the Swedenborgian church by 1819, the year his last son died as an infant, although he would be survived by a wife and several daughters who married well. Meanwhile, in 1817, John J. Cabell was one of the original 20 investors in the Kanawha Salt Company, which purchased the interests of seven entities then manufacturing salt from brine in the 10 mile stretch sometimes called the Great Buffalo Lick along the Great Kanawha River (south of what became Charleston, West Virginia long after Dr. John J. Cabell's death). Enslaved labor stoked furnaces of the Kanawha saltworks to boil brine into salt, so until the American Civil War Kanawha county had the highest percentage of slaves of any Virginia County west of the Appalachians. John J. Cabell and other subscribers agreed to jointly market their salt and originally promised to take all legal and proper means to reduce the quality of salt manufactured at their furnaces", since they believed oversupply existed in 1817 at about 500,000 bushels. The largest producer of that place and era was Steele, Donnally and Steele, with William Steele, Andrew Donnally, David Ruffner, Isaac and Bradford Noyes, Leonard and Charles Morris, Tobias and Daniel Ruffner, Aaron Stockton, Charles Brown, John Reynolds, Stephen Radcliffe and John, John D., Samuel and Joel Shrewsbury also participating in that original output cartel. However, their group never managed to enlist all the producers, and some non-participants even unsuccessfully petitioned the Virginia General Assembly to make capping a brine well a felony (citing a Kentucky statute as model). In 1822 and 1824, William Steele and Company repeated production control attempts, including by contract with John J. Cabell and Walter Trimble, with any controversies among the parties to be resolved by Andrew Donnally, William Brigham and Isaac Noyes, or any of them. In 1830, Dr. J.J. Cabell moved to the salines, where he would die in 1834. Meanwhile, in 1831, overproduction concerns continued, with John J. Cabell reporting by November that all manufacturers had agreed to cap production at one million bushels, though the producers failed to agree about individual quotas, and by 1835 production reached nearly 2 million bushels and prices had fallen in Cincinnati and other markets. The Kanawha Salt Association ultimately collapsed, and production reached its highest level (exceeding 4 million bushels) in the early 1850s. Kanawha salt also won a prize at the 1851 World Far and 1868 Paris Exposition. Although the Kanawha salines remained the country's largest producer of that vital commodity for curing meat and other uses until the American Civil War, other salines came into production along the Ohio River, as well as rock salt mines in New York state and Michigan (the Michigan Salt Association attempted a similar output pool arrangement in 1868).

The Cabell family was one of the First Families of Virginia. Col. John Cabell's nephew Samuel Jordan Cabell (1756–1818), led Patriot troops in the American Revolutionary War before returning to run plantations in the upper James River watershed and represented the area in the Virginia General Assembly, then in the U.S. House of Representatives until the year before this Samuel I. Cabell's birth. That Col. S. J. Cabell's adoptive grandfather, uncles and several cousins promoted the James River and Kanawha Canal, designed to link the two rivers while traversing the Appalachian Mountains, to expedite the transport of goods from the Ohio River valley to Atlantic ports including Richmond, the state capital, and Norfolk. It would also allow eastern manufactured goods to reach settlements of the Ohio and Mississippi River valleys. One of Col. S. J. Cabell's sons, William Symes Cabell, would remove to Hinds County, Mississippi, although his son would be a different Samuel Jordan Cabell.

== Slaveowner in Kanawha County ==
This Cabell settled in near Malden in Kanawha County, Virginia, as did his friend (and adoptive half-uncle) Napoleon Bonaparte Cabell, who became responsible for Kanawha salt sales and collections in the Ohio River watershed between Louisville, Kentucky and Cairo, Illinois for Ruffner, Donnally & Company in the 1850s. In his various wills found after his murder, Samuel Cabell always named Napoleon Bonaparte Cabell as one of the trustees responsible for his children. After the American Civil War, N.B. Cabell's sons ran the West Virginia Colliery Company. "Samuel J. Cabbel" first shows in the 1830 U.S. Census as a slaveholder of between 20 and 30 years old, living with a free black woman of between 25 and 35 years of age and 11 enslaved black males and two black females (including one girl and one boy).

In 1853, Cabell first became a landowner in the area, purchasing 967 acres (3.91 km^{2}) which once belonged to George Washington.

== Personal life ==
Cabell took one of his slaves, Mary Barnes, as his lifelong mate and fathered thirteen children (Elizabeth, Sam, Lucy, Mary Jane, Sidney Ann, Soula, Eunice, Alice, Marina [or Bobby], Braxton, Betty, William Clifford and James B.) whom he cared for, and eventually in his wills granted freedom from slavery. He sent some of them to private school in Ohio (since educating blacks was illegal in Virginia).

In addition to entrusting his children to Napoleon B. Cabell, he named his maternal uncle Nathan Reid of Patrick County, Virginia as an executor for his estate.

== Death and legacy ==
Samuel I. Cabell was murdered at his home on July 18, 1865. A week later, a weekly pro-Union Charlestown newspaper reported his death, and the arrest of Allen Spradling, Andrew Jackson Spradling, Mark L. Spradling, Stark B. Whittington, Lawrence Whittington, William Whittington and Christopher Williams. Local papers were opinionated and contradictory, some blaming the Union League and other denying such and mentioning the victim's rebel sympathies. Several trials were held, but transcripts not made or not found. Clerk office records simply indicate that each of the accused was found innocent.

Cabell did not file a will at the Kanawha County courthouse during his lifetime (perhaps because it did not permit precautionary storage), although the clerk's office later acquired at least four wills, all manumitting Mary Barnes and their children. The first will was dated November 24, 1851. The last will dated September 12, 1863 specifically denied manumission for slaves who fled during the Civil War or were taken by Union troops. The number of wills reflects Cabell's growing family, as well as Virginia state laws and legal decisions in the 1850s which made manumission more difficult.

In December 1865, the Kanawha County Commissioners found all the wills valid, and in 1869 allowed Mary and her children to change their surnames to "Cabell". Napoleon Bonaparte Cabell had been named the legal guardian of the six youngest children in late 1865, and the commissioners divided the estate among Mary and the children in 1870 and 1871. Although some of Samuel Cabell's descendants moved from the area, the town that developed on the former plantation became a haven in a sometimes racist environment, surviving despite petitions in the 1870s to ban all Negroes from Kanawha County.

When the federal government passed a law which would deny funds to states which refused higher education to black children, West Virginia purchased 30 acres of what had been Cabell's land from his daughter Marina (who may have become the first black postmistress in the state) and developed the "West Virginia Colored Institute" (which became West Virginia State University and began accepting white students after the decisions in Brown v. Board of Education). The college acquired further acreage from the former plantation, and owns the family graveyard, which includes his tombstone spelling his surname "Cabble" and where his widow was buried in 1900. Other parts of the property became a vocational rehabilitation center and industrial plants for chemicals (now owned by Union Carbide) and petrochemicals (the dormant Goodrich-Gulf plant now owned by Go-Mart). In 1945, salt production stopped after an industrial fire, although bromine extraction continued until 1985. The J.Q. Dickinson Salt Works is a modern and artisanal small business.
