= Jack Cable (software developer) =

American computer security researcher and software developer

- Employer: Cybersecurity and Infrastructure Security Agency
- Awards: Time Magazine's 25 Most Influential Teens (2018)
- Website: cablej.io

Jack Cable (born February 18, 2000) is an American computer security researcher and software developer. He is the CEO and co-founder of Corridor, an AI security startup. He is well known for his participation in bug bounty programs, including placing first in the U.S. Department of Defense's Hack the Air Force challenge in 2017. He previously served as a Senior Technical Advisor at the U.S. Cybersecurity and Infrastructure Security Agency.

For his work, Cable was named one of Time Magazine's 25 Most Influential Teens of 2018. Cable has spoken on vulnerability disclosure and election security at conferences including the DEF CON Voting Village, Black Hat Briefings, and the Wall Street Journal's Future of Everything Festival.

== Early life and education ==
Cable grew up in the Chicago suburbs and attended New Trier High School. He began programming in middle school and discovered bug bounty programs at the age of 15 after finding a vulnerability in a financial website. Cable received a B.S. in computer science from Stanford University in 2021.

== Career ==
While in college, Cable founded a cybersecurity consulting firm, Lightning Security. Cable began working for the Pentagon's Defense Digital Service in the summer of 2018. In 2019, Cable helped launch Stanford's bug bounty program, one of the first in higher education.

After discovering and reporting severe vulnerabilities in several states' electoral infrastructure, Cable joined the U.S. Cybersecurity and Infrastructure Security Agency (CISA) in the summer of 2020. There, Cable served as a technical advisor to help protect state election systems against foreign hacking attempts.

Cable joined cybersecurity consulting firm Krebs Stamos Group in 2021 as a Security Architect. Also in 2021, Cable identified a workaround in a ransomware payment system to save victims $27,000, for which he was acknowledged by U.S. Secretary of Homeland Security Alejandro Mayorkas. Cable launched Ransomwhere, a crowdsourced ransomware payment tracker that aims to address the ransomware visibility problem.

Cable rejoined CISA in 2023 to help lead the agency's Secure by Design initiative.

== Publications and articles ==
- "Every Computer Science Degree Should Require a Course in Cybersecurity". Harvard Business Review. Published August 27, 2019.
- "Why the U.S. government needs you to hack it". Fast Company. Published December 17, 2019.
- "Preventing Ransomware Attacks at Scale". Harvard Business Review. Published April 23, 2024.
