= Thomas-Alexandre Dumas =

French Army officer (1762–1806)

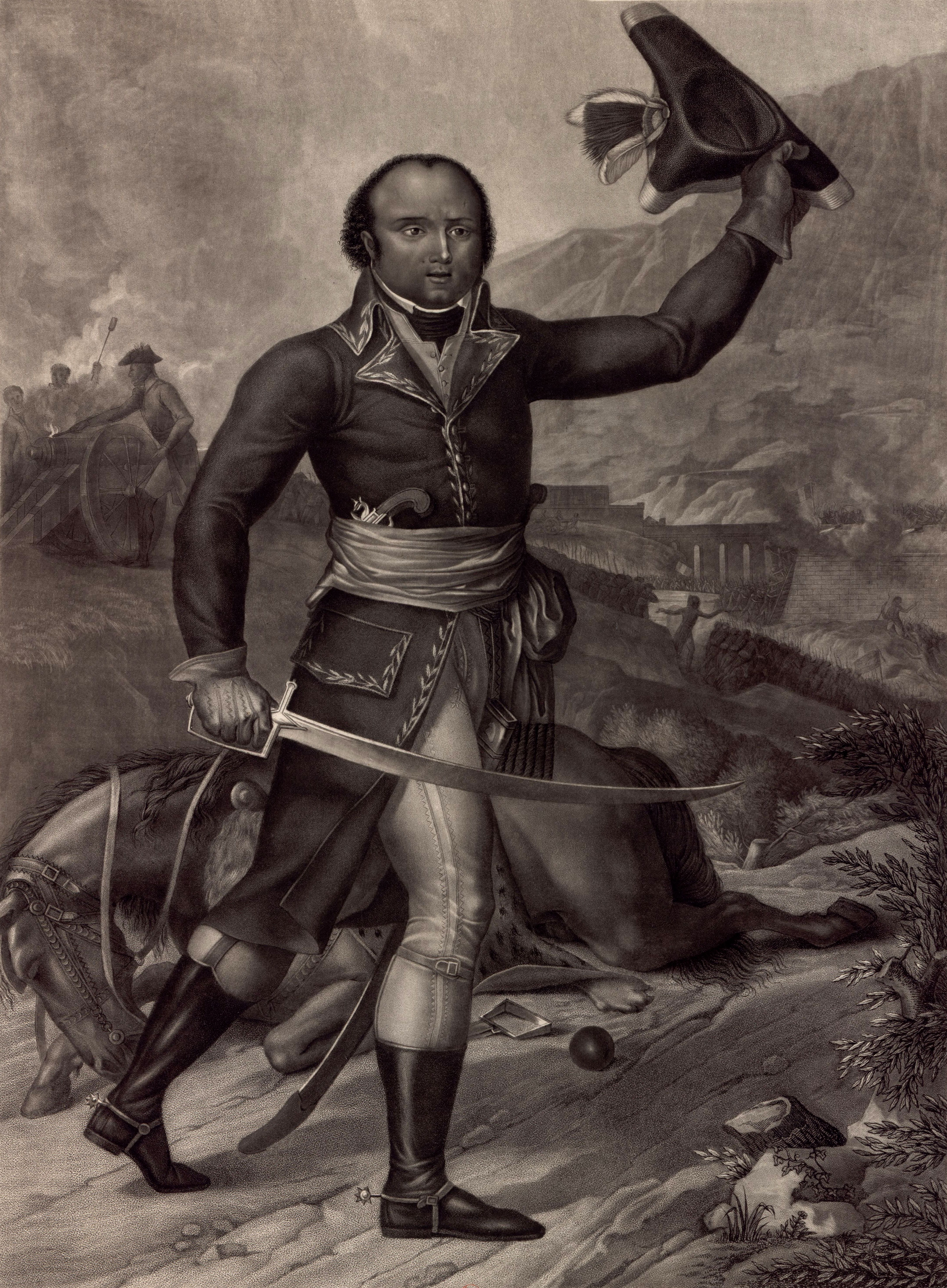
- Portrait by Guillaume Guillon-Lethière, c. 1797
- Born: Thomas-Alexandre Davy de la Pailleterie; 25 March 1762; Jérémie, Saint-Domingue
- Died: 26 February 1806 (aged 43); Villers-Cotterêts, France
- Relatives: Alexandre Dumas (son); Alexandre Dumas fils (grandson); Alexandre Lippmann (great-great-grandson)
- Military career
- Allegiance: Kingdom of France; French First Republic
- Branch: French Royal Army; French Revolutionary Army
- Service years: 1786–1801
- Rank: Divisional general
- Commands: Army of the Western Pyrenees; Army of the Alps; Army of the West; Army of the Coasts of Brest; Commander of Cavalry, Army of the Orient
- Conflicts: French Revolutionary Wars; War in the Vendée; War of the First Coalition; Italian campaigns; Siege of Mantua; War of the Second Coalition; French invasion of Egypt and Syria; Battle of the Pyramids

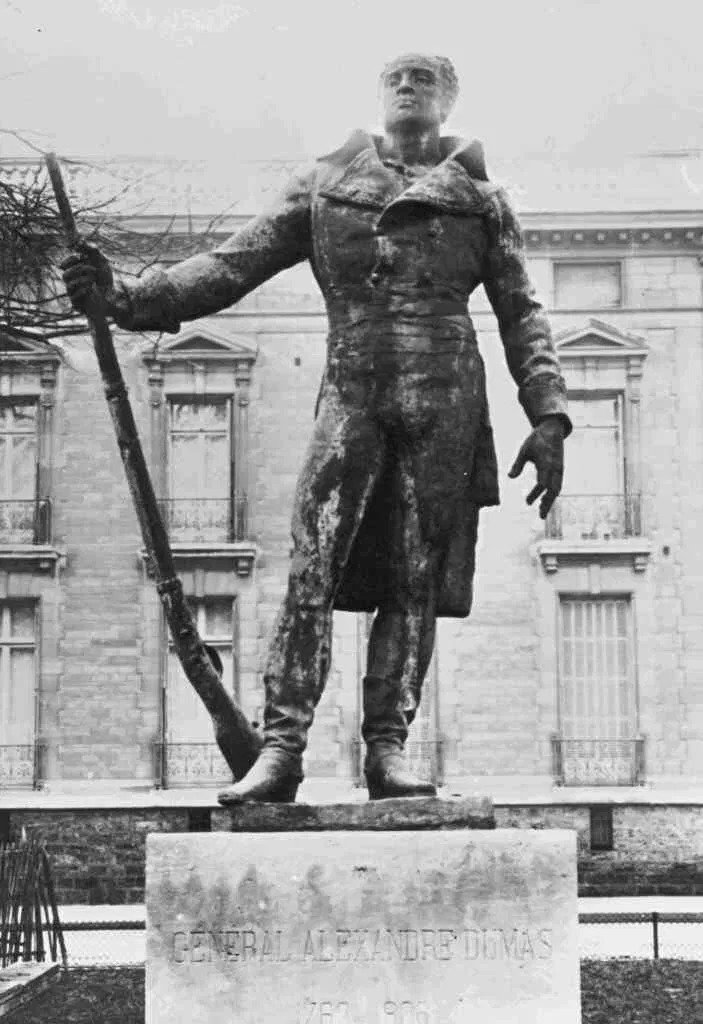
Statue of General Thomas-Alexandre Dumas, melted down following a 1941 decision of the Nazi occupation authorities

Divisional-General Thomas-Alexandre Dumas (known before as Thomas-Alexandre Davy de la Pailleterie, pronounced in French: [tɔmɑ alɛksɑ̃dʁ davi də la pajət(ə)ʁi]; 25 March 1762 – 26 February 1806) was a French Army officer who served in the French Revolutionary Wars. Along with fellow French officers Joseph Serrant and Toussaint Louverture, Abram Petrovich Gannibal from Imperial Russia and Władysław Franciszek Jabłonowski from Poland, Thomas-Alexandre Dumas was noted as a man of African descent (in Dumas's case, through his mother) leading European troops as a general officer. All four commanded as officers in the French Army and apart from Gannibal, who was only captain and engineer-sapper in the Army of Louis XV during his formative years, they all gained their general ranks in the French Army, about four decades after Gannibal had done the same in Russia. Yet Dumas was the first Black man in the French military to become brigade general, divisional general, and general-in-chief of a French army.

Born in Saint-Domingue, Thomas-Alexandre was the son of Marquis Alexandre Antoine Davy de la Pailleterie, a French nobleman, and of Marie-Cessette Dumas, an enslaved woman of African descent. He was born into slavery because of his mother's status, but his father took him to France in 1776 and had him educated. Slavery had been illegal in metropolitan France since 1315 and thus any slave would be freed de facto by being in France. His father helped him enter the French military.

Dumas played a large role in the French Revolutionary Wars. Having entered the military in 1786 at age 24 as a private, by age 31 he commanded 53,000 troops as the General-in-Chief of the French Army of the Alps. Dumas's victory in opening the high Alpine passes in 1794 enabled the French to initiate their Second Italian Campaign against the Austrian Empire. During the battles in Italy, Austrian troops nicknamed Dumas the Schwarzer Teufel ("Black Devil", Diable Noir in French) in 1797. The French—notably Napoleon—nicknamed him "the Horatius Cocles of the Tyrol" (after a hero who had saved ancient Rome) for defeating a squadron of enemy troops at a bridge over the Eisack River in Clausen (today Klausen, or Chiusa, Italy) in March 1797.

Dumas participated in the French attempt to conquer Egypt and the Levant during the Expédition d’Égypte of 1798–1801 when he was a commander of the French cavalry forces. On the march from Alexandria to Cairo, he clashed verbally with the expedition's supreme commander Napoleon Bonaparte, under whom he had served in the Italian campaigns. In March 1799, Dumas left Egypt on an unsound vessel, which was forced to run aground in the southern Italian Kingdom of Naples, where he was taken prisoner and thrown into a dungeon. He languished there until the spring of 1801. Returning to France after his release, he and his wife had a son, Alexandre Dumas (1802–1870), who would become one of France's most widely-read authors. The son's most famous literary characters were inspired by his father.

== Ancestry ==
Thomas-Alexandre Davy de la Pailleterie was born on 25 March 1762 in Saint-Domingue (today Haiti) to French nobleman Marquis Alexandre Antoine Davy de la Pailleterie and Marie-Cessette Dumas, an African woman he enslaved.

=== Father ===
==== Noble pedigree ====
Alexandre Antoine Davy de la Pailleterie, born 1714, was the oldest of three sons of the Marquis Alexandre Davy de la Pailleterie and Jeanne-Françoise Paultre (or Pautre) de Dominon. The Davy de la Pailleteries were provincial Norman aristocrats whose wealth was in decline. The family had acquired the title of "lords" (seigneurs) by 1632. The French kingdom granted the title "marquis" to the family by 1708.

Alexandre Antoine Davy de la Pailleterie ("Antoine") had two younger brothers, Charles Anne Édouard and Louis François Thérèse. All three were educated at a military school and pursued careers as officers in the French military. They first served during the War of the Polish Succession. Antoine Davy de la Pailleterie, who reached the rank of colonel, saw action at the Siege of Philippsburg in 1734.

==== Career in Saint-Domingue ====
In 1732, Antoine's younger brother Charles had been given a military posting in Saint-Domingue, a French colony in the Caribbean that generated high revenues from its sugarcane plantations, worked by African slave labour. In 1738, Charles left the military to become a sugar planter in that colony; he married Anne-Marie Tuffé, a rich local French Creole widow, and took over her estate.

That year Antoine also left the Army and joined his brother and sister-in-law in Saint-Domingue. He lived with them and worked at the plantation until 1748. In that year, the two brothers quarrelled violently, after which Antoine left Charles's plantation, taking his three personal slaves with him. At this point, Antoine broke off contact with his brother and his family for thirty years, although they both lived on the same small island. Antoine made a living in Jérémie, Saint-Domingue, as a coffee and cacao planter, under the assumed name of "Antoine de l'Isle". At some point during these years, Antoine Davy de la Pailleterie purchased the slave woman Marie-Cessette "for an exorbitant price" and made her his concubine. In 1762, she gave birth to their mixed-race son Thomas-Alexandre. During her time with Antoine, she also bore him two or three daughters.

Antoine's mother, the Marquise Jeanne-Françoise, died in 1757 and his father, the Marquis Alexandre Davy de la Pailleterie, died in 1758. Charles (although younger than Antoine) returned to Normandy to claim the title of Marquis and the family château. The British blockade of French shipping during the Seven Years' War reduced Charles' income from sugar exports, so he tried to smuggle the commodity out of Saint-Domingue from his plantation. He used a wharf in the neutral border territory (and tiny island) of Monte Cristo (today Monte Christi, Dominican Republic). (Some historians argue that this island inspired Alexandre Dumas's The Count of Monte Cristo.) Charles died of gout in 1773; Louis, the youngest of the Davy de la Pailleterie brothers, died three months later. He had served a 15-day sentence for being involved in selling defective weapons to the French military (a famous scandal at the time known as the Invalides Trial [le procès des Invalides]). Two years after the death of both his younger brothers, Antoine returned to Europe.

=== Mother ===
Marie-Cessette Dumas, described as a "great matriarch to a saga of distinguished men", was an enslaved woman and concubine of African descent owned by the Marquis Antoine Davy de la Pailleterie. They resided together at a plantation called La Guinaudée (Guinodée), near Jérémie (formerly in the French colony of Saint-Domingue, now Haiti) until shortly before Antoine's departure in 1775. He sold Marie-Cessette Dumas, their other two children, and her daughter by another man to a baron from Nantes before leaving Saint-Domingue.

The only source for her full name, "Marie-Cessette Dumas", with that spelling, is General Thomas-Alexandre Dumas's later marriage certificate and contract. Her grandson's memoir gave her name as Louise, and another source recorded Cécile. Sources have spelling variations of her name, as standardization was not common. Some scholars have suggested that "Dumas" was not a surname for Marie-Cessette, but, meaning "of the farm" (du mas), was added to her first names to signify that she belonged to the property. Others have suggested African origins of the names Cessette and Dumas, including Gabon or Dahomey.

The two extant primary documents that state a racial identity for Marie-Cessette Dumas refer to her as a "négresse" (a black female) as opposed to a "mulâtresse" (a female of visible mixed race).

Secondary sources on General Thomas-Alexandre Dumas, dating back to 1822, almost always describe his mother as a black African ("femme africaine", "négresse", "négresse africaine", "noire", or "pure black African").

==== Death ====
Sources differ on the date and circumstance of her death. Two documents signed by Alexandre Dumas—his contract and certificate of marriage to Marie-Louise Labouret—state that Marie-Cessette died in La Guinaudée, near Trou Jérémie, Saint-Domingue, in 1772. Based on this date, Victor Emmanuel Roberto Wilson speculates that she may have died in the mass outbreak of dysentery following a hurricane that struck the Grand Anse region of Saint-Domingue.

Two other documents attest that Marie-Cessette was alive after 1772: a letter recounting her sale in 1775 and an 1801 document signed by Dumas, saying that "Marie-Cezette" will be in charge of General Dumas's properties in Saint-Domingue. Thomas-Alexandre Dumas may have earlier claimed that she had died in order to avoid having to get her approval before marriage and revealing her slave status. In addition, he was in a hurry to leave for the military front.

== Names ==
Dumas used several names in his life: Thomas-Alexandre Davy de la Pailleterie, Thomas Rethoré (or Retoré), Alexandre Dumas, Alex Dumas, and Thomas-Alexandre Dumas-Davy de la Pailleterie. "Davy de la Pailleterie" is his father's family name. He used the name "Retoré" (sometimes spelt Rethoré) during and for some years after the period in which his father sold him and then re-purchased him (1775–1776). According to biographer Tom Reiss, the name Retoré was "picked up from a neighbour in Jérémie (where the name can be found on official records of the period)". "Dumas" is from his mother. The first record of him as "Alexandre Dumas" is in the registry book of the Queen's Dragoons (joined 2 June 1786). (It was known in his platoon that this was "not his real name".) He used the simple form "Alex Dumas" starting in 1794. General Dumas used the full name "Thomas-Alexandre Dumas-Davy de la Pailleterie" on his son's birth certificate.

== Appearance ==
The enlistment roll-book for the 6th Regiment of the Queen's Dragoons, which Dumas joined in 1786, described him as "6 feet tall, with frizzy black hair and eyebrows... oval face, and brown skinned, small mouth, thick lips". According to his earliest-known description (1797), he was "one of the handsomest men you could ever meet. [...] His frizzy hair recalls the curls of the Greeks and Romans." It described his face as 'something closer to ebony' than to 'bronze.'" General Dumas was described as 'dark—very dark.'

== Early life ==
Thomas-Alexandre had two siblings by his parents: Adolphe and Jeannette. They also had an older half-sister, Marie-Rose, born to Marie-Cessette before Davy de la Pailleterie purchased her and began a relationship. His father sold Marie-Cessette and her other three children before taking Thomas-Alexandre to France.

In 1776, when Alexandre was 14, his father sold the boy for 800 French livres in Port-au-Prince, officially to Lieutenant Jacques-Louis Roussel (but unofficially to Captain Langlois). This sale (with the right of redemption) provided both a legal way to have Alexandre taken to France with Langlois and a temporary loan to pay for his father's passage. The boy accompanied Captain Langlois to Le Havre, France, arriving on 30 August 1776, where his father bought him back and freed him.

From his arrival in France until Autumn 1778, Alexandre (named Thomas Retoré) first lived with his father at the Davy de la Pailleterie family estate in Belleville-en-Caux, Normandy. After his father sold that estate in 1777, they moved to a townhouse on the rue de l'Aigle d'Or in the Parisian suburb of Saint-Germain-en-Laye. There, Alexandre studied at the academy of Nicolas Texier de la Boëssière, where he was given a young nobleman's higher education. He learned swordsmanship from the Chevalier de Saint-Georges, another mixed-race man from the French Caribbean.

Flush with cash from the sale of his family estate, Davy de la Pailleterie for many years spent lavishly on Dumas. His notary said that the boy "cost him enormously". From 1777 to 1786, from age 15 to 24, thanks to his father's wealth and generosity, Dumas lived a life of considerable leisure.

In 1784, at age 22, Alexandre moved to an apartment on Rue Etienne, near the Louvre Palace in Paris, socializing at venues such as the Palais-Royal and Nicolet's Theater. In September 1784, while seated at Nicolet's Theater in the company of "a beautiful Creole" woman, he and his companion were harassed by a white colonial naval officer, Jean-Pierre Titon de Saint-Lamain, and one or two others. Following Dumas's verbal protests, the men "tried to force him to kneel before his attacker and beg for his freedom". The police report on the incident shows that Titon chose not to press charges as he might have, and all participants were released.

== Military career ==
=== Enlistment and service in the Queen's Dragoons ===
In February 1786 his father Davy de la Pailleterie married Françoise Retou, a domestic servant from the Davy de la Pailleterie estate. Dumas did not sign as a witness to the marriage contract. According to his son's memoir, the marriage precipitated a "cooling off" which led the father to tighten Dumas's allowance. Soon after, Dumas decided to join the French Army, a common occupation for gentlemen. Unlike his noble peers, who took arms as commissioned officers, Dumas enlisted as a private. A 1781 rule, the Ségur Ordinance, enabled men who could show four generations of nobility on their father's side to qualify to be commissioned as officers. Dumas had this, but the French race laws "made it hard for a man of mixed race to claim his rightful title or noble status". According to the novelist Dumas's account, on hearing of Alexandre's plan, his father insisted that his son take a "nom de guerre" so that he not drag the noble name "through the lowest ranks of the army". He signed up for the Queen's Dragoon Regiment as "Alexandre Dumas" on 2 June 1786; thirteen days later, his father died.

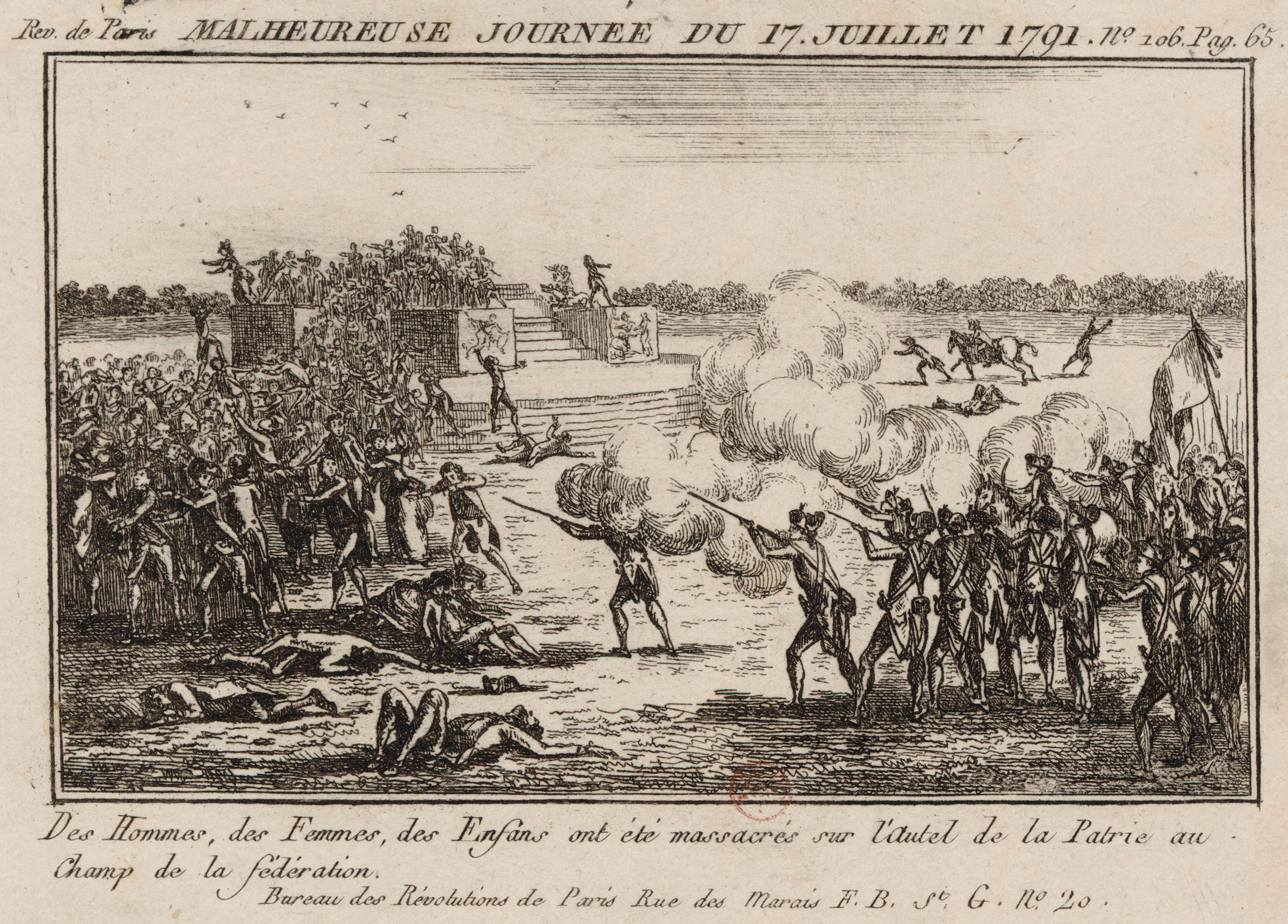
The Champ de Mars massacre, at which Dumas was present

Dumas spent his first years in the Queen's Dragoon Regiment in the provincial town of Laon, Picardy, close to the border with the Austrian Netherlands. On 15 August 1789, following the beginning of the French Revolution, his unit was sent to the small town of Villers-Cotterêts. The town's newly formed National Guard leader, innkeeper Claude Labouret, had called for them to come in response to a wave of rural violence known as the Great Fear. Dumas lodged at the Labourers Hôtel de l'Ecu for four months, during which time he became engaged to Claude Labouret's daughter Marie-Louise. Dumas's regiment was in Paris on 17 July 1791, where they served as riot police along with National Guard units under the Marquis de Lafayette during the Champ de Mars massacre of the French Revolution. Troops killed between 12 and 50 people when a large crowd gathered to sign a petition calling for the French King's removal. Two years later, when someone denounced Dumas to the Committee of Public Safety, he claimed that intervention in the conflict saved as many as 2,000 people. A corporal by 1792, Dumas had his first combat experience in a French attack on the Austrian Netherlands in April of that year. He was one of 10,000 men under the command of the General Biron. Stationed on the Belgian frontier in the town of Maulde, on 11 August 1792 Dumas captured 12 enemy soldiers while leading a small scouting party of four to eight horsemen.

=== Second-in-command of the Black Legion ===
In October 1792, Dumas accepted a commission as a lieutenant colonel in (and second-in-command of) the Légion franche des Américains et du Midi, founded a month earlier by Julien Raimond. This was a "free legion" (i.e., formed separately from the regular army) composed of free men of color (gens de couleur libres). It was called the "American Legion", "Black Legion", or Saint-Georges Legion, after its commanding officer, the Chevalier de Saint-Georges. Dumas frequently commanded the legion, as Saint-Georges was often absent. In April 1793, General Dumouriez attempted a coup d'état; Saint-Georges and Dumas refused to join it and defended the city of Lille from coup supporters. In the summer of 1793, Saint-Georges was accused of misusing government funds, and the Legion disbanded.

=== Commander-in-chief of the Army of the Western Pyrenees ===
On 30 July 1793, he was promoted to the rank of brigade general in the Army of the North. One month later he was promoted again to divisional general. In September, he was made commander-in-chief of the Army of the Western Pyrenees. In this brief assignment (September–December 1793), Dumas's headquarters were in Bayonne, France, where he was nicknamed "Mr. Humanity" (Monsieur de l'Humanité) by local sans-culottes; they wanted to intimidate him to conform to their political line at a time when French generals were extremely vulnerable to accusations of treason that often led to execution.

=== Commander-in-chief of the Army of the Alps ===
On 22 December 1793, Dumas was given command of the Army of the Alps. His campaign in the Alps centred on defeating Austrian and Piedmontese troops defending the glacier-covered Little Saint Bernard Pass at Mont Cenis, on the French-Piedmont border. After months of planning and reconnaissance from his base in Grenoble, he had to wait for snow conditions to be favourable to his troops' passage. In April and May 1794, Dumas launched several assaults on Mont Cenis. In the final attack, Dumas's army, equipped with ice crampons, took the mountain by scaling ice cliffs and captured between 900 and 1,700 prisoners.

Though his victory won Dumas praise from political leaders in Paris, he was called before the Committee of Public Safety in June 1794, for reasons unspecified but probably to face charges of treason, as this was the period of the "Great Terror", a period of accelerated political executions in the final months of the Reign of Terror period of the French Revolution. Dumas delayed his arrival in Paris until mid-July and was not seen by the Committee before the Terror ended with the execution of Robespierre on 27 July 1794.

=== Commander-in-chief of the Army of the West (1794) in the Vendée ===
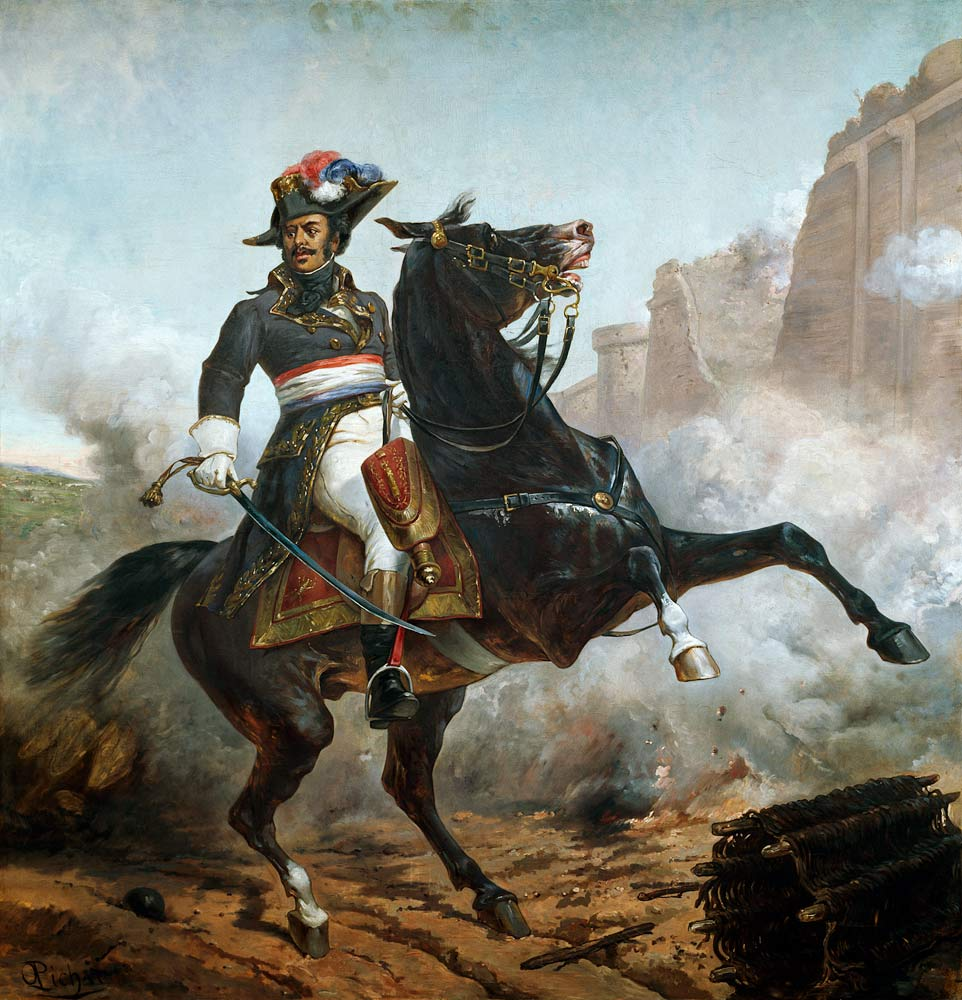
1883 portrait of Dumas

In early August 1794 Dumas was briefly assigned to command the École de Mars military school at Neuilly-sur-Seine near Paris. He was reassigned to lead the Army of the West from August to October 1794. He was responsible for consolidating the recent government victory over a massive insurgency in the region of the Vendée against the French revolutionary government. He focused on increasing military discipline and eliminating soldiers' abuses of the local population. One historian, despite or because of his pro-royalist sentiments, characterised Dumas in this command as "fearless and irreproachable", a leader who "deserves to pass into posterity and makes a favourable contrast with the executioners, his contemporaries, whom public indignation will always nail to the pillory of History!"

=== General in the Army of the Rhine (France) ===
In September 1795 Dumas served under General Jean-Baptiste Kléber in the Army of the Rhine. He participated in the French attack on Düsseldorf, where he was wounded.

=== General in the Army of Italy ===
==== Siege of Mantua ====
General Dumas joined the Army of Italy in Milan in November 1796, serving under the orders of commander-in-chief Napoleon Bonaparte. Tension between the two generals began as Dumas resisted Napoleon's policy of allowing French troops to expropriate local property. In December 1796, Dumas was in charge of a division besieging Austrian troops at the city of Mantua. By Christmas, he intercepted a spy carrying a message to the Austrian commander with important tactical information. On 16 January 1797, Dumas and his division halted an Austrian attempt to break out of the besieged city and prevented Austrian reinforcements from reaching Mantua. The French were thereby able to maintain the siege until French reinforcements could arrive, leading to the city's capitulation on 2 February 1797.

==== Campaign in Northern Italy ====
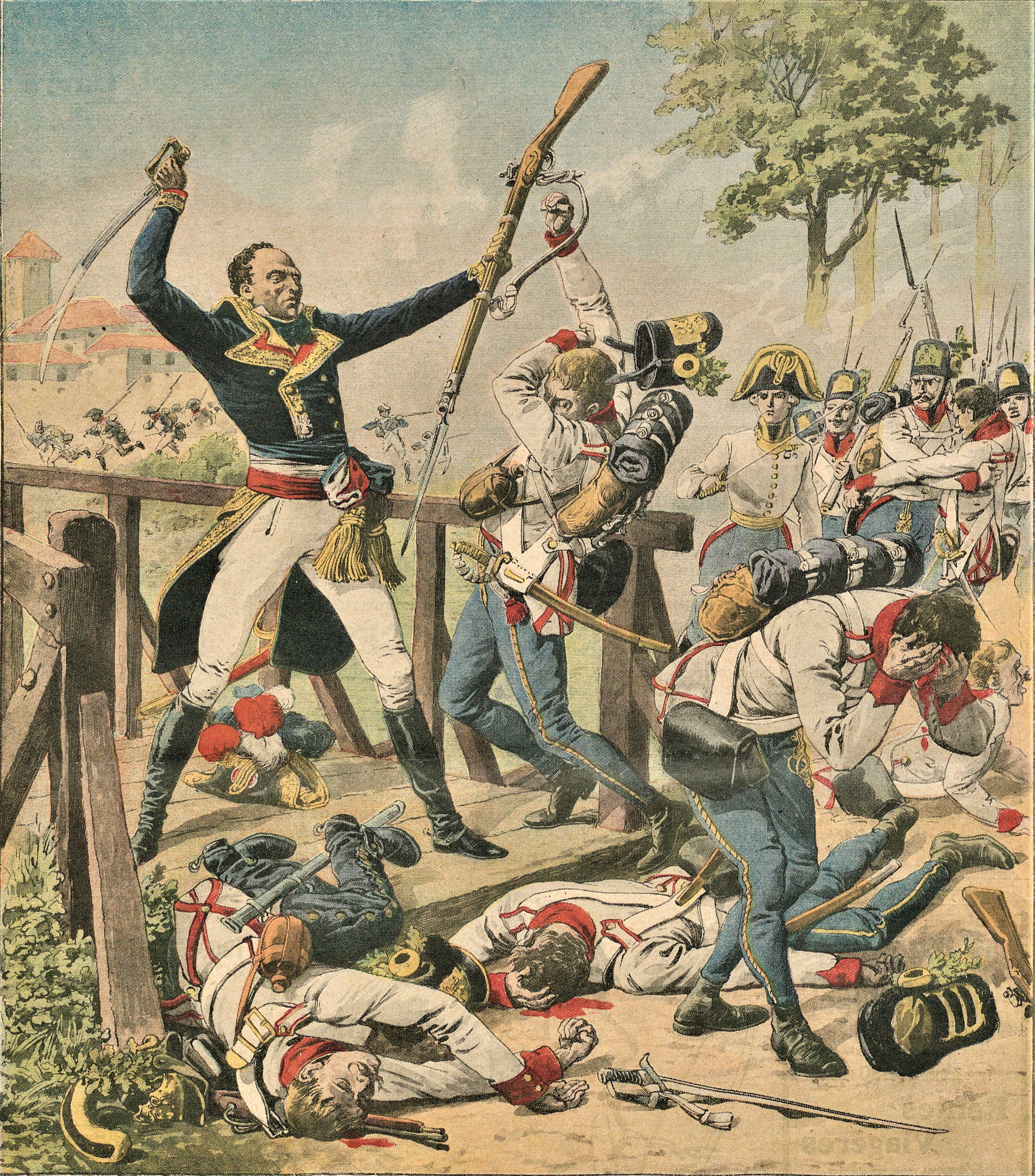
Dumas driving back Austrian troops at Clausen

Following the 16 January fighting, Dumas felt insulted by the description of his actions in a battle report by General Berthier, Bonaparte's aide-de-camp, and wrote a letter to Napoleon cursing Berthier. Dumas was subsequently omitted from mention in Napoleon's battle report to the Directory, France's government at the time. He was then given a command well beneath his rank, leading a subdivision under General Masséna, despite a petition from Dumas's troops attesting to his valour. Under General Masséna in February 1797, Dumas helped French troops push the Austrians northward, capturing thousands. It was in this period that Austrian troops began calling him the der schwarze Teufel ("Black Devil", or Diable Noir in French).

In late February 1797, Dumas transferred to a division commanded by General Joubert, who requested Dumas for his republicanism. Under Joubert, Dumas led a small force that defeated several enemy positions along the Adige River. Dumas's achievement in this period came on 23 March, when he drove back a squadron of Austrian troops at a bridge over the Eisack River in Clausen (today Klausen, or Chiusa, Italy). For this, the French began referring to him as "the Horatius Cocles of the Tyrol" (after a hero who saved ancient Rome). Napoleon called Dumas by this, and rewarded him by making him cavalry commander of French troops in the Tyrol; he also sent Dumas a pair of pistols. Dumas spent much of 1797 as military governor, administering Treviso province, north of Venice.

=== Commander of Cavalry in the French Campaign in Egypt ===
Dumas was ordered to report to Toulon, France, in March 1798 for an unspecified assignment. He joined an enormous French armada in preparation for departure to a secret destination. The armada departed on 10 May 1798, destination still unannounced. It was only on 23 June, after the fleet had conquered Malta, that Napoleon announced the mission's main purpose: to conquer Egypt. Aboard the Guillaume Tell, in the middle of the Mediterranean Sea, Dumas learned that he had been appointed as commander of all cavalry in the Army of the Orient. The armada arrived in the port of Alexandria at the end of June, and on 3 July Dumas led the Fourth Light Grenadiers over the walls as the French conquered the city. After fighting, Napoleon sent Dumas to pay ransom to some local Egyptians who had kidnapped French soldiers. The expedition's chief medical officer recounted in a memoir that local Egyptians, judging Dumas's height and build versus Napoleon's, believed Dumas to be in command. Seeing "him ride his horse over the trenches, going to ransom the prisoners, all of them believed that he was the leader of the Expedition."

From 7 to 21 July, Dumas commanded the invading army's cavalry as it marched south from Alexandria to Cairo. Conditions of heat, thirst, fatigue, and lack of supplies for the troops on the desert march were harsh; there were several suicides. While camped in Damanhour, General Dumas met with several other generals (Lannes, Desaix, and Murat). They vented criticisms of Napoleon's leadership and discussed the possibility of refusing to march beyond Cairo. Dumas soon participated in the Battle of the Pyramids (following which he chased retreating Mameluke horsemen) and the occupation of Cairo. At some point during the occupation, Napoleon learned of the earlier mutinous talk and confronted Dumas. In his memoirs, Napoleon remembered threatening to shoot Dumas for sedition. Dumas requested leave to return to France, and Napoleon did not oppose it. Napoleon was reported to have said: "I can easily replace him with a brigadier."

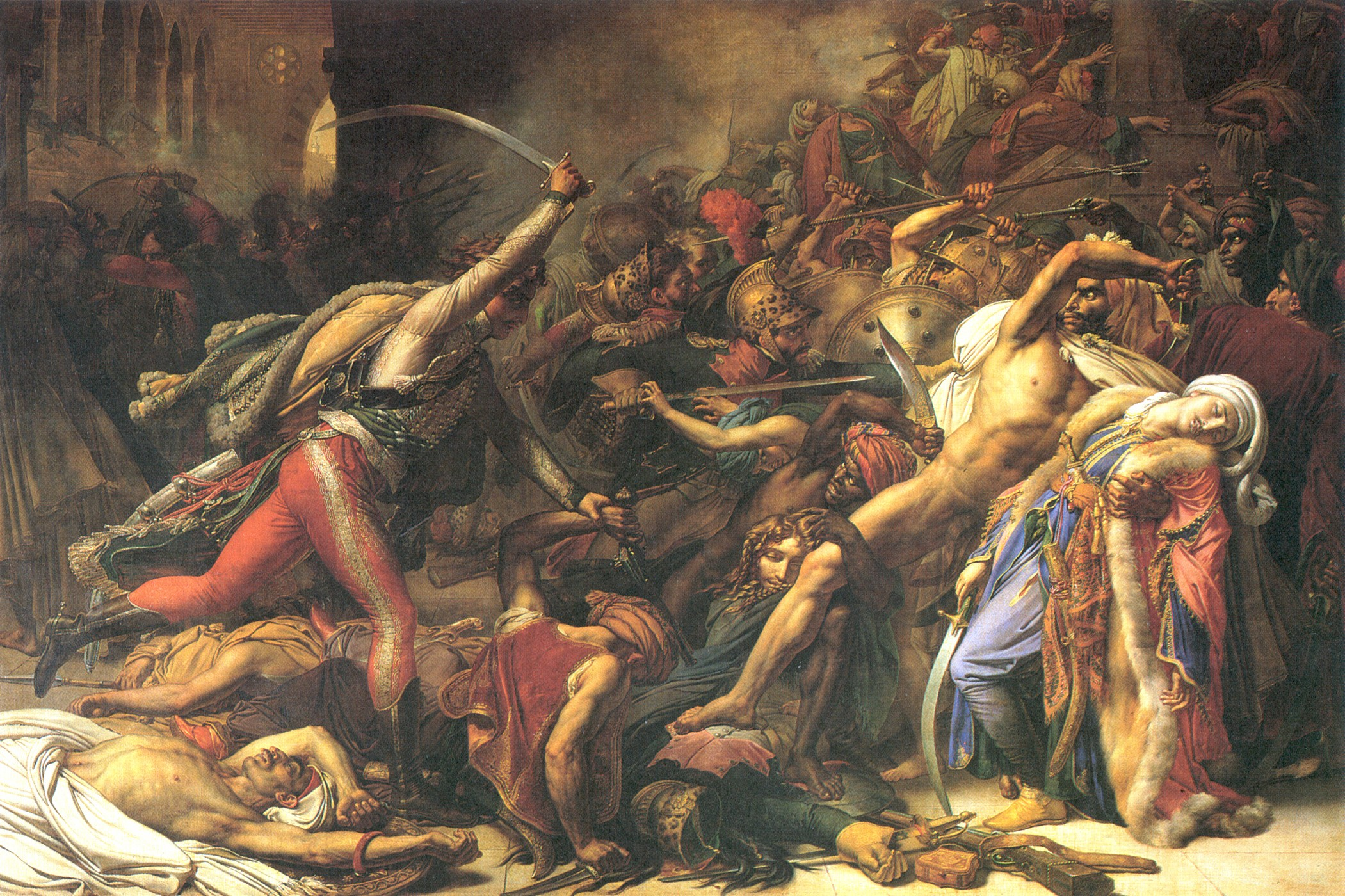
The Revolt of Cairo, which Dumas helped to suppress

Following the Battle of the Nile, which destroyed the French fleet that had accompanied Napoleon's army to Egypt, Dumas was unable to get out of Egypt until March 1799. In August 1798, Dumas discovered a large cache of gold and jewels beneath a house in French-occupied Cairo, which he turned over to Napoleon. In October, he was important in putting down the Revolt of Cairo by charging into the Al-Azhar Mosque on horseback. Afterwards (according to his son, drawn largely from the memories of Dumas's aide-de-camp Dermoncourt), Napoleon told him: "I shall have a painting made of the taking of the Grand Mosque. Dumas, you have already posed as the central figure." The Girodet painting, however, which Napoleon commissioned eleven years later, shows a white man charging into the mosque.

On 7 March 1799, Dumas boarded a small ship called the Belle Maltaise in the company of his fellow General Jean-Baptiste Manscourt du Rozoy, the geologist Déodat Gratet de Dolomieu, forty wounded French soldiers, and several Maltese and Genoan civilians. Dumas had sold the furnishings of his quarters in Cairo, and purchased 4,000 pounds of moka coffee; eleven Arabian horses (two stallions and nine mares) to establish breeding stock in France; and hired the ship.

While returning to France, the ship began to sink, and Dumas had to jettison much of his cargo. The ship was forced by storms to land at Taranto, in the Kingdom of Naples. Dumas and his companions expected to get a friendly reception, having heard that the Kingdom had been overthrown by the Parthenopean Republic. But that short-lived republic had succumbed to an internal uprising by a local force known as the Holy Faith Army, led by Cardinal Fabrizio Ruffo, in alliance with King Ferdinand IV of the Kingdom of Naples, who was at war with France.

=== Imprisonment in the Kingdom of Naples ===
The Holy Faith Army imprisoned Dumas and the rest of the passengers and confiscated most of their belongings. Early on in the captivity, Cardinal Fabrizio Ruffo tried to trade Dumas for a Corsican adventurer named Boccheciampe, an imposter posing as Prince Francis, son of Ferdinand IV, to aid the Holy Faith movement. Boccheciampe had been captured by French forces north of the Neapolitan kingdom, shortly after he had visited the prisoners, who were held inside Taranto's Aragonese Castle, but Ruffo lost interest in a trade when he learned Boccheciampe had been killed by the French.

Dumas was malnourished and kept incommunicado for two years. By the time of his release, he was partially paralyzed, almost blind in one eye, had been deaf in one ear but recovered; his physique was broken. He believed his illnesses were caused by poisoning. During his imprisonment, he was aided by a secret local pro-French group, which brought him medicine and a book of remedies. In November 1799, Napoleon returned to Paris and seized power. Dumas's wife lobbied his government for assistance in finding and rescuing her husband, to little result. Napoleon's forces, under the command of Dumas's fellow general Joachim Murat, eventually defeated Ferdinand IV's army and secured Dumas's release in March 1801.

== Political views ==
Dumas made few political statements, but those he made suggest deeply felt republican beliefs. One month after the French National Convention abolished slavery (4 February 1794), Dumas sent a message to troops under his command in the Army of the Alps:

Your comrade, a soldier and General-in-Chief ... was born in a climate and among men for whom liberty also had charms, and who fought for it first. A sincere lover of liberty and equality, convinced that all free men equal, he will be proud to march out before you, to aid you in your efforts, and the coalition of tyrants will learn that they are loathed equally by men of all colours.

== Marriage and family ==
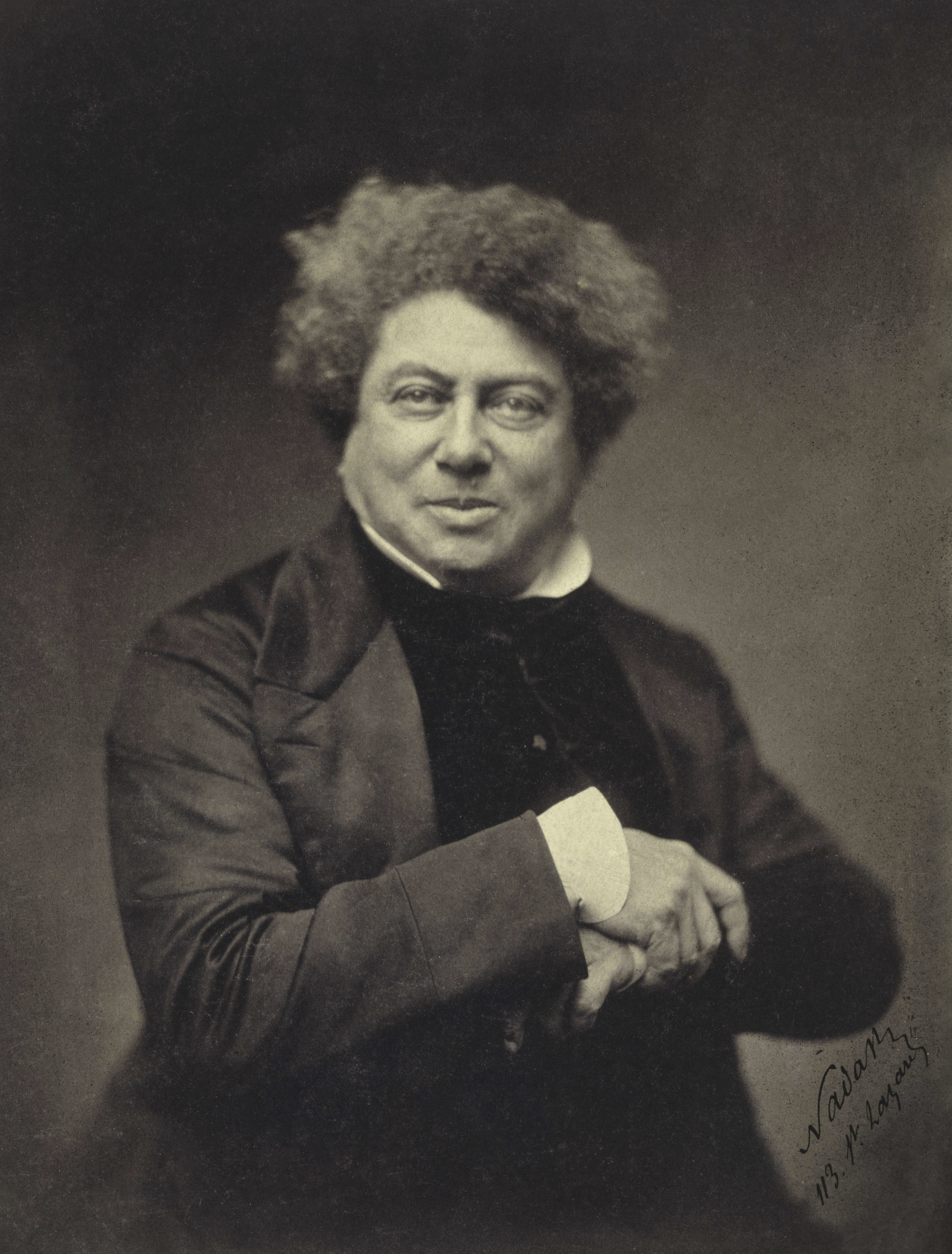
Dumas' son Alexandre in 1855

On 28 November 1792, stationed with the Black Legion in Amiens, Dumas married Marie-Louise Élisabeth Labouret in Villers-Cotterêts. According to his French biographer Claude Ribbe, it is in the courtyard of Château de Villers-Cotterêts that the young soldier Dumas met his future wife on 15 August 1789, almost 250 years to the day after the famous Ordinance was firmed by king Francis I in that same place. She stayed in Villers-Cotterêts with her family during his military campaigns. Dumas bought a farm of 30 acres there. They had daughters Marie-Alexandrine (b. September 1794), Louise-Alexandrine (b. January/February 1796, d. 1797), and a son, Alexandre Dumas (b. July 1802), who became a notable author, with success in plays and adventure novels.

== Later years and death ==
After he gained release in 1801, Dumas was not awarded "the pension normally allocated to the widows of generals" by the French government and he struggled to support his family after his return to France. He repeatedly wrote to Napoleon Bonaparte, seeking back-pay for his time lost in Taranto and a new commission in the military. He died of stomach cancer on 26 February 1806 in Villers-Cotterêts, when his son Alexandre was three years and seven months old. The boy, his sister, and his widowed mother were plunged into deeper poverty. Marie-Louise Labouret Dumas worked in a tobacconist's shop to make ends meet. For lack of funds, the young Alexandre Dumas was unable to get even a basic secondary education. Marie-Louise lobbied the French government to pay her military widow's pension. Marie-Louise and the young Alexandre blamed Napoleon Bonaparte's "implacable hatred" for their poverty.

== Legacy and honors ==
- The general's grandson, Alexandre Dumas fils (1824–1895), became a celebrated French playwright in the second half of the nineteenth century. Another grandson, Henry Bauër (1851–1915), never recognized by the novelist Dumas, was a left-leaning theatre critic in the same period.
- Dumas's name is inscribed on the south wall of the Arc de Triomphe.
- In 1913, a statue of General Dumas was erected in Place Malesherbes (now Place du Général Catroux) in Paris in the Autumn 1912 after a long fundraising campaign spearheaded by Anatole France and Sarah Bernhardt. From the moment of its installation until some time after July 1913, the statue was covered by a shroud due to the difficulty of the numerous governmental agencies involved to reach an agreement on the modalities of its official inauguration. It stood in Place Malesherbes for thirty years, alongside statues of Alexandre Dumas's descendants Alexandre Dumas, père (erected 1883) and Alexandre Dumas fils (erected 1906), as well as of Sarah Bernhardt. Germans destroyed it in the winter of 1941–1942.
- In 2009, a sculpture in his honour, made by Driss Sans-Arcidet, was erected in Paris, Place du Général Catroux (formerly Place Malesherbes). Representing broken slave shackles, it was unveiled on 4 April 2009. Critic Jean-Joël Brégeon claimed that the symbolism of the statue was inappropriate due to his noble upbringing, he had never been a slave. However, his father sold and then re-purchased Alexandre Dumas, disproving this. Dumas biographer Tom Reiss suggested that the monument is inappropriate for other reasons: "In the race politics of twenty-first-century France, the statue of General Dumas had morphed into a symbolic monument to all the victims of French colonial slavery ... There is still no monument in France commemorating the life of General Alexandre Dumas."
- In April 2009, writer Claude Ribbe started an internet petition, asking French President Nicolas Sarkozy to award General Dumas the Légion d'honneur. As of February 2014, the petition has gathered over 7,100 signatories.

== Portrayal in popular culture ==
=== In video games ===
- Thomas-Alexandre Dumas is a supporting character in the 2014 game Assassin's Creed Unity, an ally of the Assassin Order and acting as a mole for them against the Templar plot of the fictional General Marcourt. His character is voiced by Zambian actor Mizinga Mwinga in English and by Haitian-Quebecer Fayolle Jean Jr. in French.
- He is also a dateable non-player character in the historically-based dating sim video game Ambition: A Minuet in Power released by Joy Manufacturing Co in 2020.

=== In films ===
- In 2009, Dumas was interpreted by Stany Coppet in Le diable noir (The Black devil), the 52 minute TV docu-fiction adaptation of his own eponymous 2002 biography of the general by historian-director Claude Ribbe which was broadcast on French public channels of the France Télévisions group several times from 18 April 2009 onwards.
- Dumas was interpreted by Avant Strangel in 2023 film on François de Charette and the War in the Vendée Vaincre ou mourir.
- Dumas was portrayed by Abubakar Salim in Ridley Scott's 2023 biopic Napoleon.
- An upcoming film on his life will held by Ladj Ly.

=== In children's books ===
- Alex fils d'esclave (Alex, son of a slave) by Christel Mouchard with illustrations by François Roca (April 2019), a fictionalised version of Alex Dumas' life story for twelve-year-old children and beyond, in French.
- To Liberty! The Adventures of Thomas-Alexandre Dumas by Catherine Johnson, illustrated by Rachel Sanson for ages 9–10 and older (July 2020).

== See also ==
- Abram Petrovich Gannibal
- The Black Count: Glory, Revolution, Betrayal, and the Real Count of Monte Cristo
- Representation of slavery in European art
- Museum Alexandre Dumas
