= Marie-Cessette Dumas =

Grand Matriarch of the Dumas family

Marie-Cessette Dumas, or Marie Louise Labouret was an enslaved woman in the French colony of Saint Domingue. She was the mother of General Thomas-Alexandre Dumas, the grandmother of novelist Alexandre Dumas, and the great-grandmother of playwright Alexandre Dumas fils, and has been called a "great matriarch to a saga of distinguished men". She was a slave of African descent kept by the Marquis Alexandre Antoine Davy de La Pailleterie. They lived at a plantation called La Guinaudée (or Guinodée) near Jérémie of the French colony of Saint-Domingue (now Haiti), until Antoine's departure in 1775.

== Slavery ==
Two primary source documents show that Marie-Cessette Dumas was enslaved. One is a 1776 letter from a retired royal prosecutor in Jérémie to the Count de Maulde, the son-in-law of Thomas-Alexandre Dumas's uncle, Charles Davy de la Pailleterie. The letter states that Dumas's father (Alexandre-Antoine Davy de la Pailleterie, then known as Antoine de l’Isle) "bought from a certain Monsieur de Mirribielle a negress named Cesette at an exorbitant price," then, after living with her for some years, "sold ... the negress Cezette" along with her two daughters "to a ... baron from Nantes." The second is a legal judgment signed by Thomas-Alexandre Dumas, then known as Thomas Retoré or Rethoré, and his recently widowed step-mother Marie Retou Davy de la Pailleterie, which attests officially that Retou gave up her property rights over Marie-Cessette Dumas and her two daughters.

== Name ==
The only source for her full name with the spelling "Marie-Cessette Dumas," is General Thomas-Alexandre Dumas's marriage certificate and contract. The name Marie is given in some sources as Louise. On her gravestone, her name is given as Marie-Louise Labouret. Cessette is also spelled Cecette and Cezette in one primary source and given in others as Cécile. There has been some speculation that the family name "Dumas," rather than representing a family name for Marie-Cessette, instead means "of the farm" (du mas) and constitutes a descriptive addition to her first names meant to signify that she belonged to the property. Others have proposed that the name Cessette may have originated in Gabon, where Marie-Cessette might have been captured by slave traders. According to Francophone novelist Calixthe Beyala, the name "Dumas" was initially "Dûma," of Fang origin, meaning "dignity." Hans Werner Debrunner has written that she would have been Yoruba or Dahomeyan.

== Racial identity ==
The two extant primary documents that state a racial identity for Marie-Cessette Dumas refer to her as a "négresse" (a black female)—as opposed to a "mulâtresse" (a mixed-race female with half black and half white ancestry). The first is a 3 June 1776 letter from the retired royal prosecutor Chauvinault, who was hired by the Count de Maulde (son-in-law of Thomas-Alexandre Dumas’ uncle Charles Davy de la Pailleterie). It states that Dumas’ father (Alexandre-Antoine Davy de la Pailleterie, then known as Antoine de l’Isle) "bought ... a negress named Cesette," then, after living with her for some years, "sold ... the negress Cezette" (the spelling of her name varies in the letter itself). While describing her as a "negress," of entirely Black African descent, the letter classifies the four children she had with Antoine (including Thomas-Alexandre Dumas) as "mulattos."

The second document is a legal judgment signed before "the Counselors of King, Notary Publics in the Châtelet of Paris" on 22 November 1786, which settled property ownership issues between Thomas-Alexandre Dumas (then known as Thomas Rethoré) and his step-mother, Marie Françoise Elisabeth Retou (widow of his father, Alexandre-Antoine Davy de la Pailleterie). In it, Marie-Cesette Dumas is mentioned as "Marie Cezette, negress, mother of Mr. Rethoré" ("Marie Cezette negresse mere dud. [dudit] S. Rethoré"). Secondary sources on General Thomas-Alexandre Dumas, dating back to 1822, almost always describe his mother as a black African ("femme africaine," "négresse," "négresse africaine," "noire," or "pure black African").

== Death ==
Sources differ on the date and circumstance of her death. Two documents signed by Alex Dumas—his contract and certificate of marriage to Marie-Louise Labouret—state that Marie-Cessette died in La Guinaudée, near Trou Jérémie, Saint-Domingue, in 1772. Based on this death date, Victor Emmanuel Roberto Wilson speculates that she may have died in the mass outbreak of dysentery following a devastating hurricane that struck principally the Grand'Anse region of Saint-Domingue that year. There is good reason, however, to believe that she did not die in 1772. Two other documents say Marie-Cessette remained alive after that year. The 1776 letter from Chauvinault to the Count de Maulde, cited above, states that Dumas's father Antoine sold Marie-Cessette in 1775 before returning to France. A second document, this one signed by Dumas in 1801, states "Marie-Cezette" will be in charge of General Dumas's properties in Saint-Domingue. This evidence makes it unlikely that Marie-Cessette Dumas died in 1772.

According to the writer Claude Ribbe, Thomas-Alexandre Dumas may have deliberately entered a false death date on the marriage certificate. He had urgent reason to claim she was dead at the moment of his marriage in Villers-Cotterêts, France, in 1792, since he would have been required to consult her opinion on the marital union if she were living.

== Sources ==
- Letter from Chauvinault, former royal prosecutor in Jérémie, Saint Domingue, to the Count de Maulde, June 3, 1776, privately held by Gilles Henry.
- Marriage contract and marriage certificate, both November 28, 1792, Musée Alexandre Dumas (Villers-Cotterêts, France). A copy of the certificate is also held in Archives de l’Aisne (Laon, France), 304 E 268.
- Judgment in a dispute between Alexandre Dumas (named as Thomas Rethoré) and his father's widow, Marie Retou, Archives Nationale de France, LX465.
- Alexandre Dumas, père, Mes mémoires, v. 1 (Paris, 1881).
- Registry of the Dragoons in the Regiment of the Queen, Dumas entry, June 2, 1786, privately held by Gilles Henry.
- Service historique de l'Armée de terre, G.D. 2/S 91, Dossier Dumas de la Pailleterie (Thomas Alexandre), certificat de services, cited by Erick Noël, "Une carrière contrariée: Alexandre Dumas, homme de couleur et général révolutionnaire," Etudes Françaises, no. 5 (March 1998), 61.
- Gilles Henry, Les Dumas: Le secret de Monte Cristo (Paris: France-Empire, 1999).
- Victor Emmanuel Roberto Wilson, Le général Alexandre Dumas: Soldat de la liberté (Sainte-Foy, Quebec: Les Editions Quisqueya-Québec, 1977).
- Albert M’Paka, Félix Eboué, 1884-1944, gouverneur général de l'Afrique équatoriale française: Premier résistant de l'Empire: Grand Français, grand Africain (Paris: Editions L'Harmattan, 2008).
- Hans Werner Debrunner, Presence and Prestige, Africans in Europe: A History of Africans in Europe before 1918 (Basel : Basler Afrika Bibliographien, 1979.), 128.
- Antoine-Vincent Arnault, Antoine Jay, Etienne de Jouy, and Jacques Marquet de Norvins, "Dumas (Alexandre Davy-de-la-Pailleterie)," in Biographie nouvelle des contemporains, v. 6 (Paris, 1822), 160; Marie Nicolas Bouillet, Dictionnaire universel d'histoire et de géographie, 9th ed., pt. 1 (Paris: Librairie de L. Hachette, 1852), 525.
- Alphonse Rabbe, Claude-Augustin-Charles Vieilh de Boisjoslin, and Francois-Georges Binet de Boisgiroult, baron de Sainte-Preuve, "Dumas (Alexandre-Davy)," in Biographie universelle et portative des contemporains, v. 2. (Paris, 1834), 1469; Eugène de Mirecourt, Les contemporains: Alexandre Dumas (Paris: Gustave Havard, 1856), 10; Edmond Chevrier, Le général Joubert d'après sa correspondance: Étude historique (Paris: Fischbacher, 1884), 98; André Maurel, Les Trois Dumas (Paris: Librairie illustrée, 1896), 3.
- Philippe Le Bas, "Dumas (Alexandre Davy de la Pailleterie)," in Dictionnaire encyclopédique de la France, v. 6 (Paris, 1842), 773;
- Mullié, Charles (1852). "Dumas (Alexandre Davï de la Pailleterie)" . Biographie des célébrités militaires des armées de terre et de mer de 1789 à 1850 (in French). Paris: Poignavant et Compagnie. p. 462.
- Alexandre Dumas, fils, "Préface," in Frédéric Fèbvre, Journal d'un comédien, 1870-1894, v. 2, (Paris: Paul Ollendorff, 1896), vii.
- Percy Fitzgerald, The Life and Adventures of Alexandre Dumas, v. 1 (London, 1873).
- Anonymous, "Contributors’ Club: The Dumas Lineage," Atlantic Monthly (January 1896), 142.
- Claude Ribbe, Le diable noir: Biographie du général Alexandre Dumas, 1762-1806, père de l'écrivain (Monaco: Alphée, 2008 and 2009).
- Legal document, November 8, 1801, quoted in Raphäel Lahlou, Alexandre Dumas ou le don de l’enthousiasme (Paris: Bernard Giovanangeli, 2006), 13.
