= Alexandre Dumas Museum =

Museum in Villers-Cotterêts, Aisne, France

Museum Alexandre Dumas
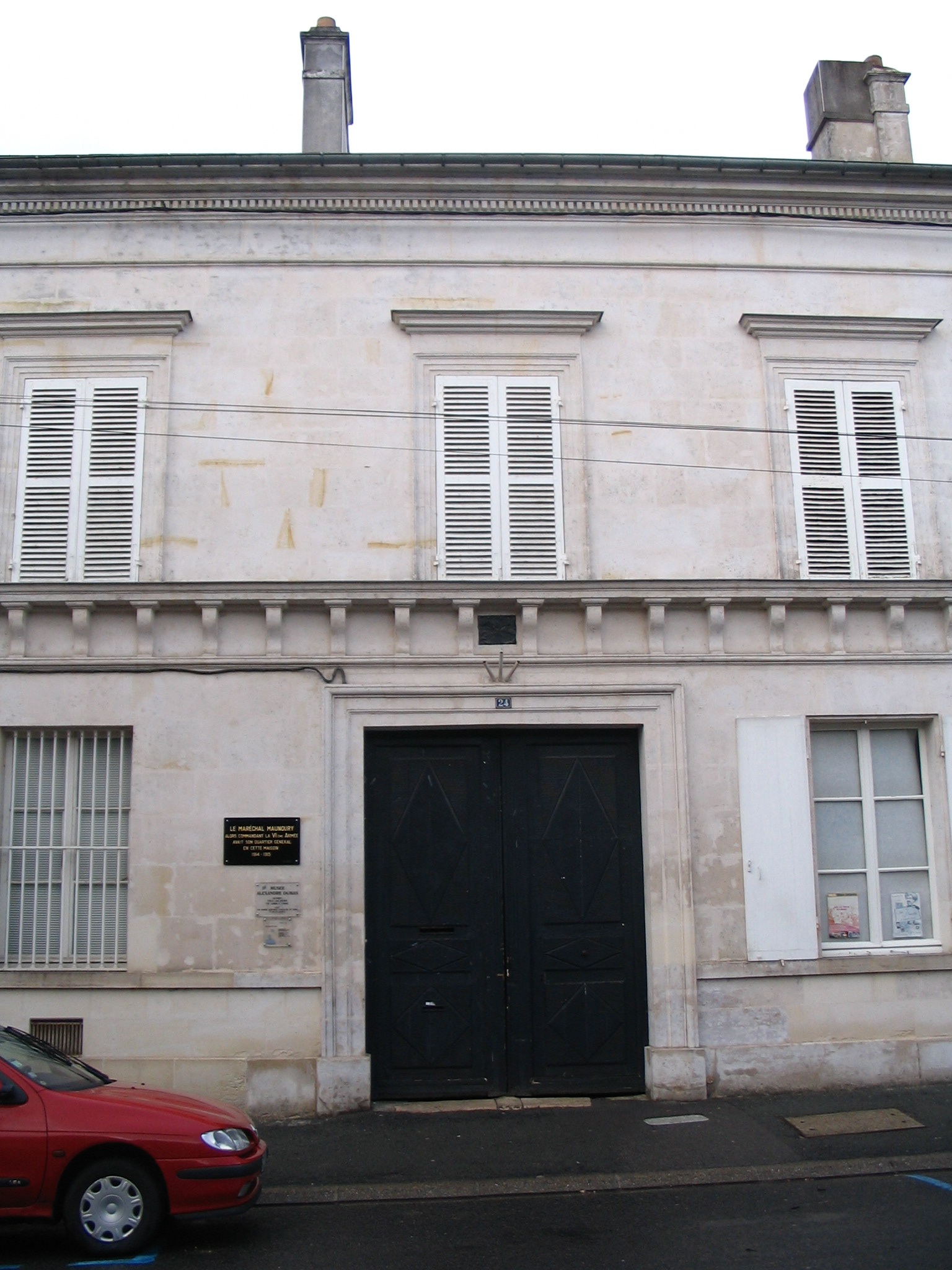
- Established: 1905
- Location: Villers-Cotterêts (France)
- Coordinates: 49°15′11″N 3°05′23″E
- Type: 2 000
- Website: Musée Alexandre Dumas

The Alexandre Dumas Museum (French: Musée Alexandre Dumas) opened in 1905 in Villers-Cotterêts in the commune of Aisne, France, where Thomas-Alexandre Davy de la Pailleterie, father of the writer Alexandre Dumas and grandfather of Alexandre Dumas fils, academician, died in 1806. The museum was named a Musée de France in 2002.

The museum is one of the various sites in the city which recall the link between Villers-Cotterêts and the Dumas family: the Royale Château de Villers-Cotterêts de François Ier, the Saint-Nicolas church, the town hall, the Hôtel de l'Épée, the Abbé-Grégoire college or the family house.

== History ==
In 1902, the centenary of Alexandre Dumas's birth the Regional Historical Society of Villers-Cotterêts was given responsibility to open a museum displaying items relating to the Dumas family. The museum then opened in 1905, at 13 rue Demoustier.

The museum has grown and moved through the years. During the First World War, in order to protect the collections from the war, it was moved to Dijon.

In 1932, the museum reopened at the Dauphin Hotel. In this year the Alexandre Dumas Friends Society was created to support and develop the museum.

In 1952, the museum moved to a 19th century mansion that served as General Maunoury's headquarters during the First World War.

The museum has three rooms, each of them dedicated to one of the family members:

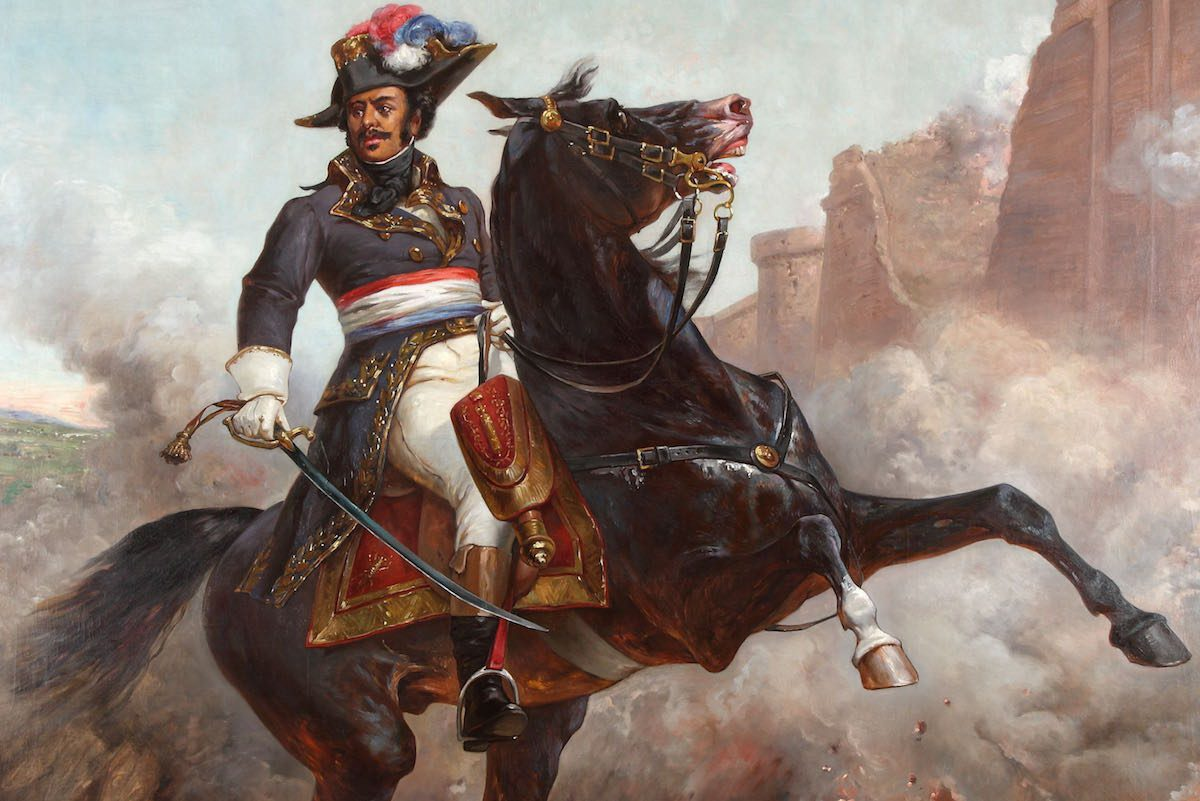
Thomas Alexandre Dumas

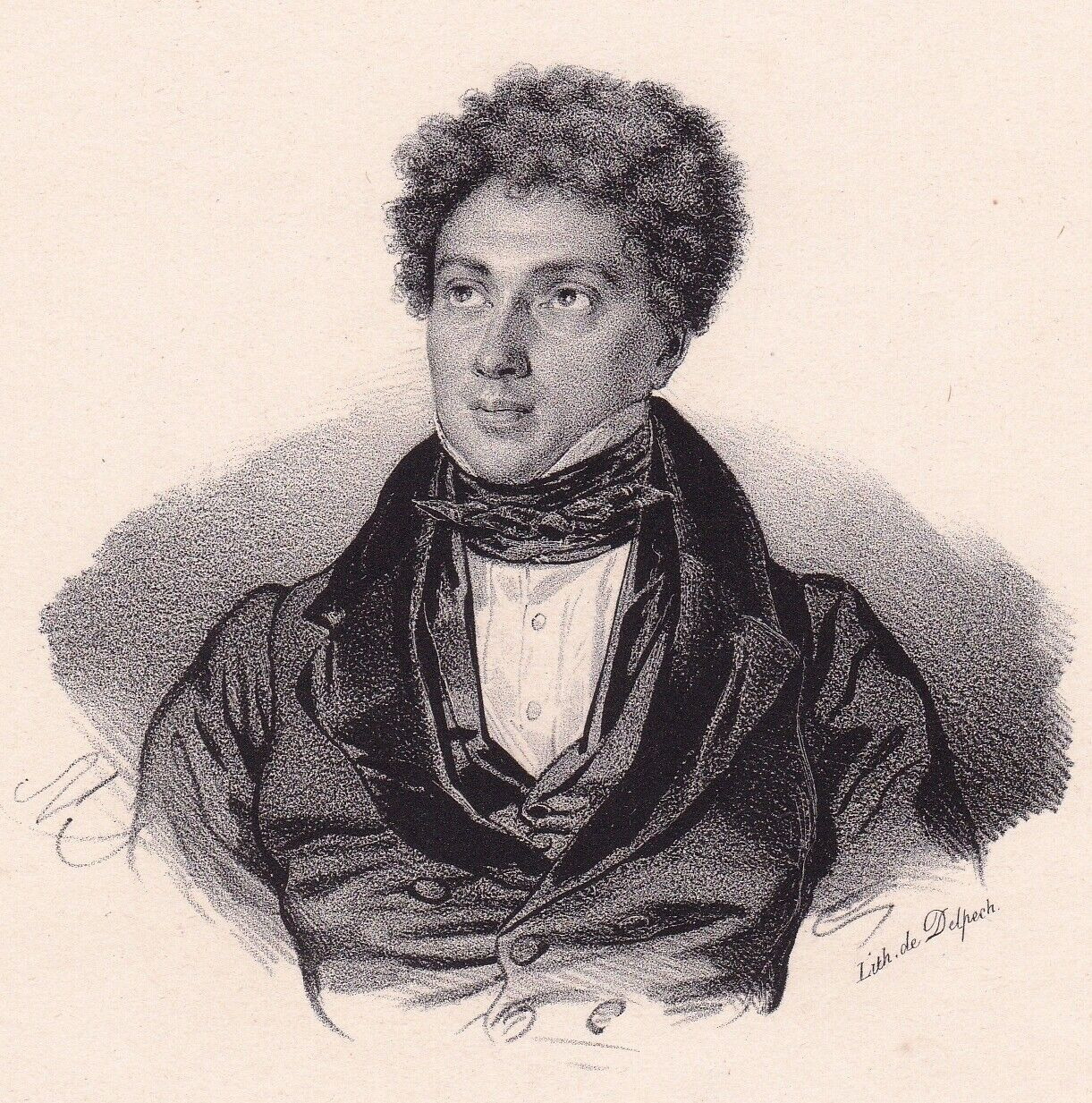
Alexandre Dumas père

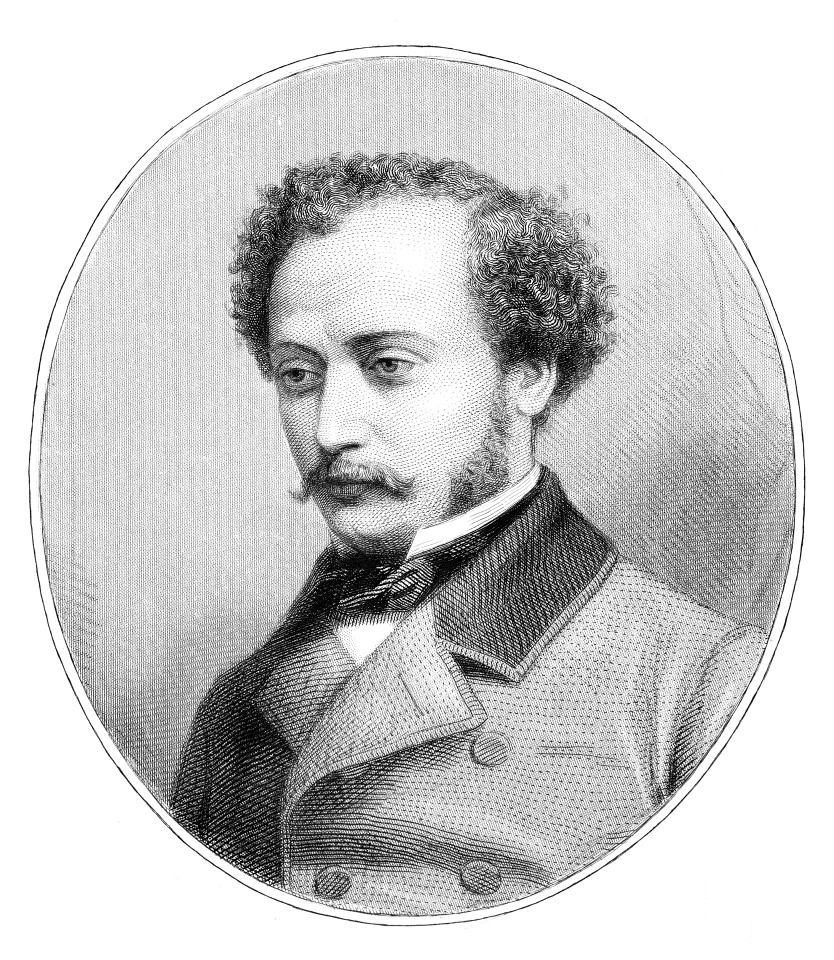
Alexandre Dumas fils

== Collections ==
The museum collections evoke the three Dumas, the general born in the Antilles and a slave, the author of the Count of Monte Cristo and the academician. They bring together numerous portraits, personal objects, documents written by the Dumas family.

Numerous manuscripts by Dumas Père adorn the museum: travel accounts, drafts of novels, children's stories, his memoirs, etc.

The museum also hosts many art pieces on the three men signed by famous artists: Louis Boulanger, Eugène Giraud, Albert-Ernest Carrier-Belleuse, Jules Franceschi, Edouard Dubufe, Jules Lefèvre, Jules Machard, Alphonse de Moncel, etc.

The museum organizes activities around events, museum nights, themed evenings, temporary exhibitions, etc.

== Pictures ==
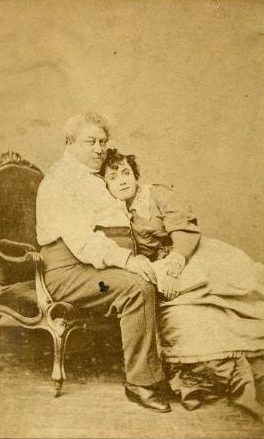
Alexandre Dumas and Miss Menken

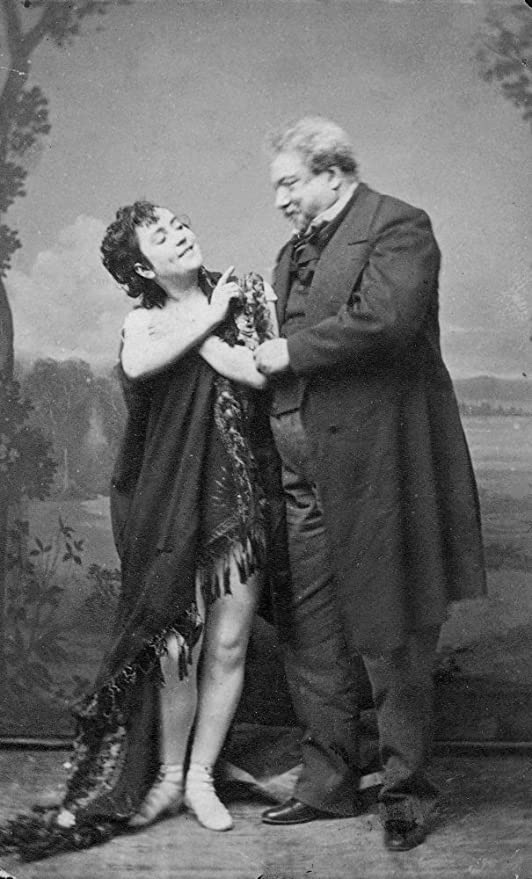
Alexandre Dumas and Miss Menken

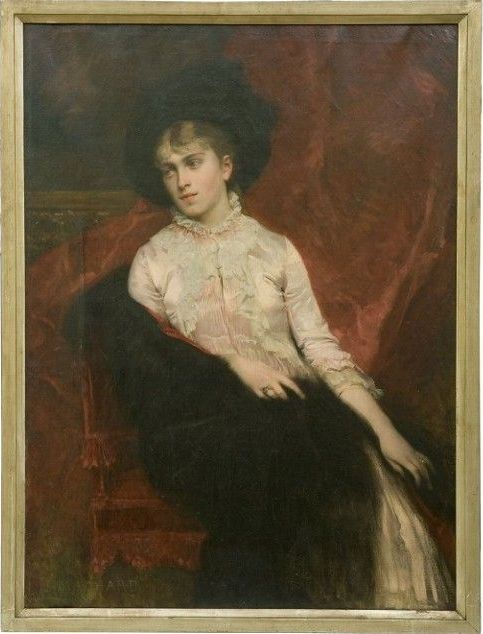
Colette Dumas

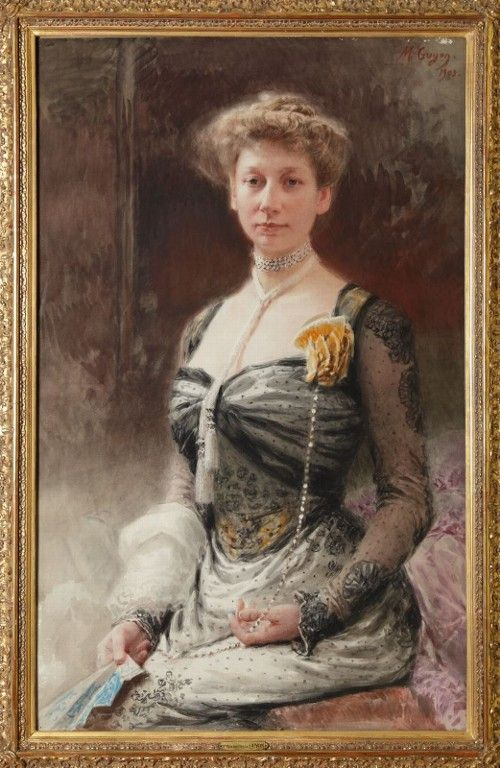
Jeannine d'Hauterive, Dumas' (fils) daughter

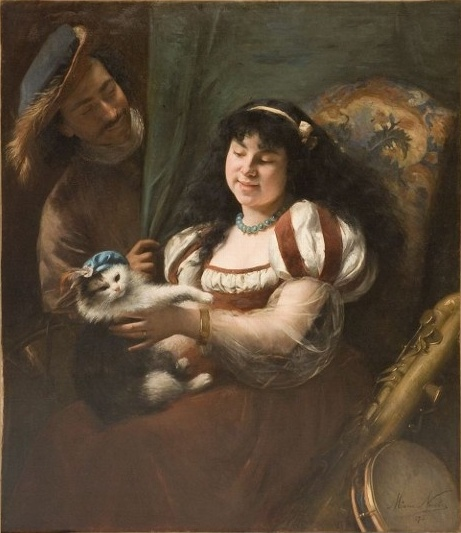
Marie Joséphine Nicolas

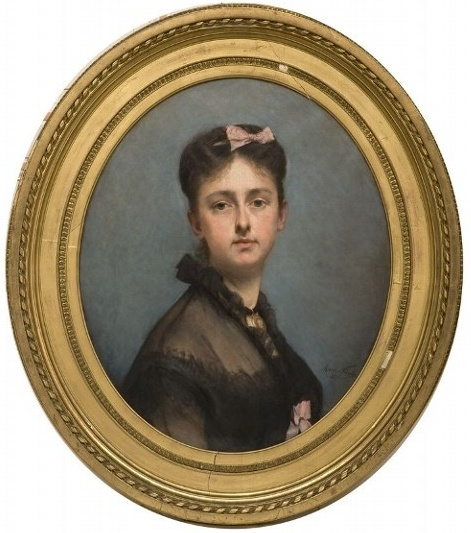
Marie Joséphine Nicolas

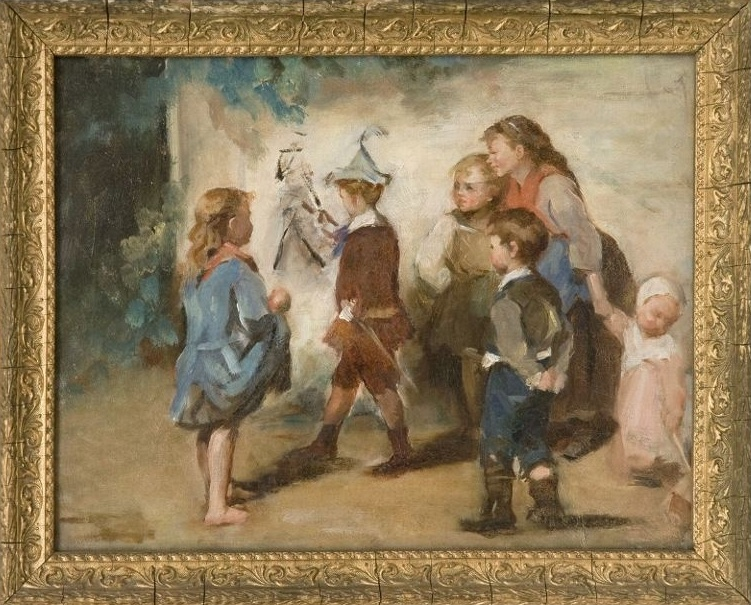
Marie Joséphine Nicolas
