= Joseph Serrant =

French Army officer (1767–1827)

- Born: 10 January 1767; Saint-Pierre, Martinique
- Died: 7 November 1827 (aged 60) Clermont-Ferrand, Puy-de-Dôme
- Allegiance: France
- Branch: Infantry
- Service years: 1782-1815
- Rank: brigadier general
- Conflicts: French Revolutionary Wars; Napoleonic Wars
- Awards: Officer of the Legion of Honour; Chevalier de Saint-Louis

Joseph Serrant (10 January 1767 – 7 November 1827) was a French general during the Revolution and the subsequent First French Empire. He is notable as a man of African descent leading European troops as a general officer, along with fellow French officer Thomas-Alexandre Dumas, Toussaint Louverture of Haiti, Abram Petrovich Gannibal of Imperial Russia and Władysław Franciszek Jabłonowski of Poland.

== Revolutionary Period ==
Serrant was born in 1767 in Saint-Pierre, Martinique, the son of Antoine Serrant, a planter, and Élisabeth, a woman of mixed European and African heritage. He joined as a volunteer in the Bouillé regiment in 1782 and participated as a corporal in the campaign in Dominica in 1783. Released after five years, he settled as a shoemaker in Saint-Pierre.

At the beginning of the revolution, Serrant resumed service in the National Guard and attended the Dominican Club, where he formed a bond with Louis Delgrès. The two men raised a petition regarding the status of free people of colour and were forced into exile in Dominica. They boarded the frigate La Félicité, commanded by Captain Lacrosse, which took them to Saint Lucia, where Delgrès was made a lieutenant and Serrant second lieutenant. The frigate next sailed to Pointe-à-Pitre, arriving on 9 December. Lacrosse announced the First French Republic and the implementation of human rights as well as the abolition of slavery. However, this proclamation would not lead to any effective measures.

Serrant then joined the 109th line infantry regiment under the command of Donatien de Rochambeau and earned his captain's stripes. He was taken prisoner during the fighting in Martinique against the British on 15 February 1794 and sent to Plymouth. He was exchanged in May 1795 and assigned to the 106th battle infantry demi-brigade. Serrant was then sent to Pont-d'Ouilly with the mission of restoring peace by eradicating the Chouannerie. In August 1796, Serrant joined the 13th line infantry demi-brigade before being transferred to the Helvetia army within the 87th line demi-brigade. Under the orders of Colonel Armand Philippon, he participated in the campaigns of the Grisons and Valais, before joining Piedmont. He was wounded at Murazzano on 31 October 1799. Until 1804, Serrant fought in Switzerland and Northern Italy before being appointed commander of the garrison at Orbetello.

== Empire ==
In 1804, Serrant joined the 5th Line Infantry Regiment, taking part in the campaign in Venice before his regiment was sent to occupy Dalmatia. He directed the capture of Curzola and was then tasked with defending Ragusa by General Lauriston. There, he earned his rank of battalion commander on 21 June 1806, and the cross of knight of the Legion of Honour.

Serrant then took part in the Battle of Debilibriche, and was wounded and taken prisoner during the Battle of Gospich. He was exchanged and appointed colonel of the 3rd regiment of Croatian chasseurs ("Ogulin Regiment"). In 1811, he took command of the 8th Line Infantry Regiment assigned to the army corps of Eugène de Beauharnais for the Russian campaign. During the battle of Ostrovno, on 25 and 26 July, he was wounded while protecting the cavalry of Joachim Murat, and he was promoted to the rank of officer of the Legion of Honour five days later. Promoted to brigadier general on 29 September 1812, he was wounded at the Battle of Maloyaroslavets on 24 October, then led his regiment during the retreat before being taken prisoner at Vilnius on 9 December. He escaped, crossed Poland alone and rejoined Beauharnais at Magdeburg.

Back in France, Serrant was placed on convalescent leave on 2 April 1813. Employed in the 7th military division on 10 January 1814, he served under Joseph Marie Dessaix in Savoy. He captured Annecy on 24 February, then the Gorges des Usses on 26 February, served in the Battle of Saint-Julien on 1 March, and was victorious again in Annecy on 23 March 1814. He was placed on inactive status on 20 June 1814 and made a Knight of Saint Louis on 14 November.

== Restoration ==
On 9 May 1815, he was employed with General Puthod in Lyon, and he was placed in inactive status on 1 August 1815. Considered available within the framework of the general staff on 30 December 1818, he was admitted to retirement on 16 February 1825. Serrant died on 7 November 1827 in Clermont-Ferrand. Contrary to what some authors claim, Joseph Serrant was not a baron of the Empire, as the letters patent for the title were never issued. According to the file of the historical service of the Army, he submitted a petition to Louis XVIII to confirm this title, which led to a police investigation into his mixed origins and a refusal from the king.

== Bibliography ==
- Le dossier personnel de Joseph Serrant se trouve au S.H.A.T. à Vincennes.
- Six, Georges (1934). "Serrant (Joseph, baron)". Dictionnaire biographique des généraux et amiraux français de la Révolution et de l'Empire: 1792–1814 (in French). Vol. 2. Paris: Librairie Historique et Nobilaire. p. 451.
- Abel, A. Louis. Les libres de couleur en Martinique, Tome II (1789–1802) Paris: Librairie Harmattan, 2012.
- Pisani, Abbé Paul. La Dalmatie de 1797 à 1815 – Épisode des conquêtes napoléoniennes Paris: Librairie Picard, 1893.
- Chabaud, Raymond (4 November 2015). Le nègre de Napoléon: Joseph Serrant, seul général noir de l'Empire (in French). Paris: HC éditions. ISBN 978-2-35720-249-8..
- "Notice no. LH/2505/70". Base Léonore (in French).
