= Napoleon's Crimes =

2005 book by Claude Ribbe

- Author: Claude Ribbe
- Language: French
- Publication date: 2005
- ISBN: 978-2350760124

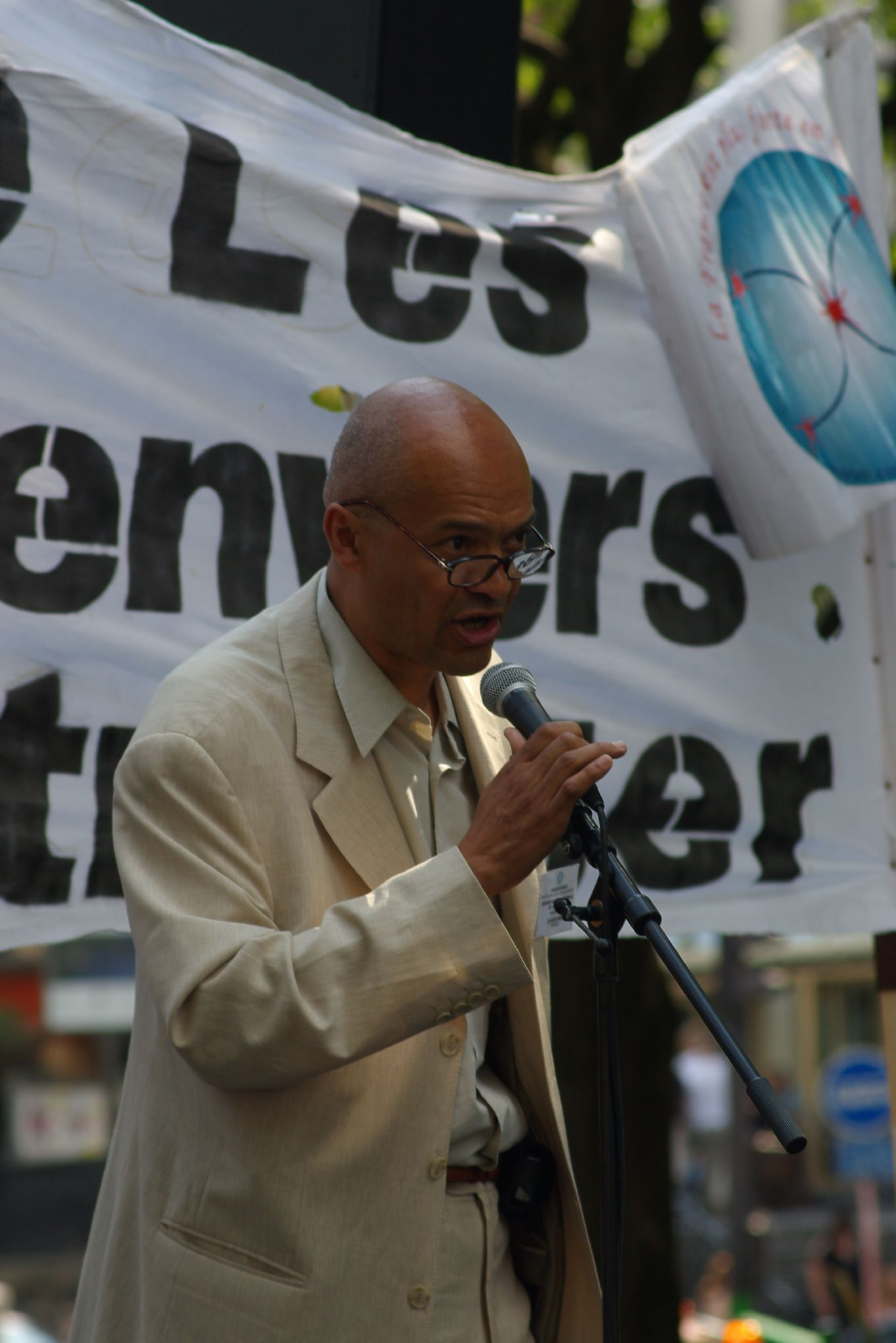
Claude Ribbe in 2007

Napoleon's Crimes: A Blueprint for Hitler (French: Le Crime de Napoléon) is a book published in 2005 by French-Caribbean writer Claude Ribbe. In the book, Ribbe advances the thesis that Napoleon during the Haitian Revolution first used gas chambers as a method of mass execution, 140 years before Hitler and the Nazis. His accusations in the book have caused a minor political and academic storm when it was published, and its premise remains under contention to this day.

== Background ==
The book was written in a context of social tension for the bicentenary of the Battle of Austerlitz and in the same timeframe as the Affaire Olivier Grenouilleau, in which the author is strongly implicated. Jérôme Gautheret, in Le Monde, considers that « Le Crime de Napoléon n'est pas un livre d'histoire » "is not a history book" and describes it as « charge polémique dirigée contre les historiographes officiels » "a polemical charge directed against the official historiographers" and a "pamphlet" that does not really contribute to a "critical re-reading of the colonial fact".

== Overview ==
In brief, Ribbe's thesis is that Napoleon engaged in conduct against rebellious Haitian slaves that would meet modern-day definitions of war crimes and probably fall under the rubric of genocide. In the early 19th century, Napoleon had reinstated slavery in the French colonies of Saint-Domingue (now Haiti) and Guadeloupe. These colonies were subsequently hit by a series of massive slave rebellions. Napoleon, as the person responsible for the reinstatement of slavery after the First French Republic had seen to its abolition, was in charge of putting the slave revolts down, and he did so with brutal efficiency. Ribbe claims that some of Napoleon's men refused to do as they were ordered, and then later wrote journals describing the massacre. From these passages, he claims that Napoleon's troops burnt sulphur (readily collected from nearby volcanoes) to make sulphur dioxide gas, which is poisonous. This would have been effective at helping to quell the rebelling Caribbean slaves.

Ribbe's most controversial accusation is that the holds of ships were used as makeshift gas chambers; and that up to 100,000 black slaves were murdered in them. These revelations are still in considerable academic dispute, but when the book was published, the French establishment was quick to condemn his allegations. The French newspaper France Soir, a populist tabloid, for instance, published a stinging editorial, calling the claims of the book insane. The French historian Pierre Branda wrote a critical analysis of Ribbe's book, stating that it is mainly based on suppositions and that the sources are few and often quoted and referred to with heavy omissions.

== Reception ==
Nicolas Lebourg denounces "this type of anachronism, [...] describing the slave trade as a Holocaust in wedges".

== See also ==
- Polish Legions, one of the French army units sent to Haiti

== Sources ==
- Ribbe, Claude (2007). Napoleon's Crimes: A Blueprint for Hitler. Oneworld Publications. ISBN 978-1-85168-533-2.
- A newspaper report, Napoleon's genocide 'on a par with Hitler', appeared in the Daily Telegraph in late 2005 about the controversy. Retrieved July 2006
- Une thèse montée de toutes pièces: Le Crime de Napoléon de Claude Ribbe (French) http://www.napoleon.org/fr/salle_lecture/articles/files/critiqueribbe_branda_decembre2005.asp
