= Mobilization of non-ferrous metals =

World War II requisition of metals in France

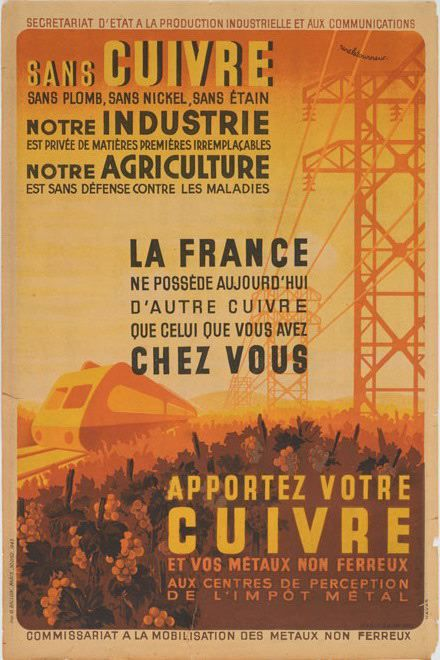
July 1943 propaganda poster produced by Vichy France's Secretary of State for Industrial Production and Communications to publicize the mobilization of non-ferrous metals

The mobilization of non-ferrous metals was an event in Second World War France, starting in 1941. During it Nazi Germany requisitioned a large amount of non-ferrous metals for its armament factories, including tin, lead, nickel and copper. With the collaboration of the Vichy regime and under the cover-story of supporting French agriculture, the population was invited to donate such metals, while church bells and many statues were melted down. Some curators estimate that around 1700 statues were destroyed on the Vichy regime's orders, including more than 100 in Paris.

== Historic context ==
In 1941, with Operation Barbarossa underway and the war becoming longer and more expensive than it expected, German industry needed more metal than ever to build weapons and munitions. Copper was needed to make cartridge cases for shells and machine-gun and rifle ammunition and lead, nickel and manganese were used in electric batteries and battery packs. Agriculture in occupied France also needed metals to produce pesticides and fertilisers (for example copper sulphate was an anti-mildew fungicide for vines and lead arsenate was an insecticide to protect potatoes against Colorado potato beetles), although that reason was also simply a cover-story to requisition metals really intended for German military use.

To meet these needs, a campaign to requisition French non-ferrous metals began in 1941. The year before the occupiers had destroyed fifty artworks, seen by the Nazis as symbols of Germany's defeat in 1918 and alleged German atrocities earlier in the First World War, though some towns took down and hide such works before the Germans arrived, such as the fallen German eagle on the war memorial at La Couarde-sur-Mer.

== Course ==
Posters were put up in the towns and cities of France encouraging the population to participate in the campaign by contributing their copper and lead everyday objects such as door knobs, cauldrons, lamps, candlesticks and bicycle frames to a central 'metal tax'. To avoid protests and incidents, the posters only mentioned the agricultural and not the military uses for the metals. The French state paid groups and individuals 6 francs per kilo of lead, 30 francs per kilo of brass, copper, copper alloys, bronze and nickel silver and 75 francs per kilo of tin.

Despite the propaganda the initial campaign did not produce enough metal and so bronze statues and artworks were also requisitioned. A law passed on 11 October 1941 stated that "statues and monuments in copper alloys in public places and administrative locations which have no artistic or historic interest will be removed". The law excepted bronze statues in cemeteries and museums and on war memorials, though the Nicolas Raggi statue of Louis XVI in the musée des Beaux-Arts de Bordeaux was sacrificed, as were the Franco-Prussian War memorials in Coutances, Niort, Pontoise, Quimper, Saint-Quentin, and Verdun. The national authorities also favoured sparing artworks relating to Christianity and the French monarchy, though the statues of Joan of Arc in Beaulieu-les-Fontaines, Langres and Mehun-sur-Yèvre were melted down.

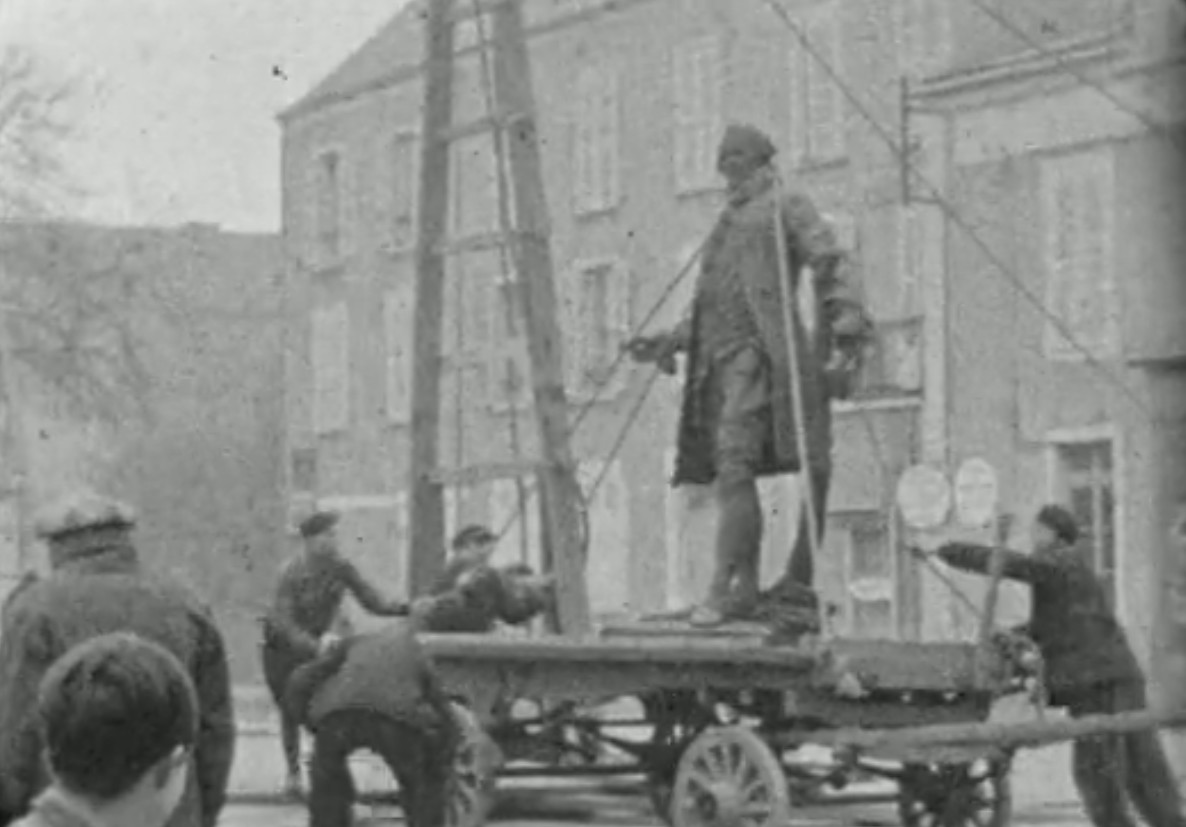
Removal of the statue of Henri Louis Duhamel du Monceau in Pithiviers on 19 February 1942.

Even though the aim was to revitalise the French economy, "the metals thus gained [were] directly delivered to Germany, to make up for the lack of primary materials in the armament industry". According to academic Kirrily Freeman, iconoclasm was neither the motor nor the reason for the campaign, which was guided more by pragmatic motifs than economic interests. Beate Pittnauer indicated that "above all it was regional communities which opposed this law's adoption, to prevent the effective dismantling of statues taken in isolation". The Vichy regime also profited from the law to remove busts and statues of figures they felt represented free republican spirit or values opposed to Vichy's révolution nationale Some monuments put up almost a century earlier represented forgotten historical figures - in provincial villages the figures' renown was essentially local.

Three cabinet ministers were directly involved, with the services in Paris and the networks in the departements placed under the prefects' responsibility. Artworks were picked by the Ministry of National Education and its upper committee of fine arts, the latter headed by Louis Hautecœur. The Metal Import and Distribution Groups (Groupements d'Importation et de Répartition des Métaux or GIRM) led the removal, transport and destruction of chosen artworks right across France. Bronzes were moved by train to the region around Paris and assigned to metallurgial recovery companies designated by GIRM to store them before they were taken to Germany.

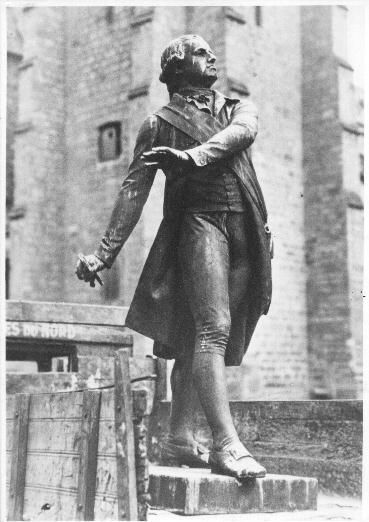
Removal of the statue of Jean-François-Pierre Poulain de Corbion in Saint-Brieuc on 4 March 1942.

The central authorities banned photography of the sculptures' removal, meaning very few photographs or films show the process. The rare images were taken in small or medium-sized towns. Central government rapidly set up plans to replace some of the bronze artworks with new stone ones which were not allowed to be "a more or less exact copy of the turnips whose removal has been decided upon". Replacement sculptures in stone were paid for by the towns and villages themselves. The state recommended keeping the money received for the sale of the original artworks' bronze to spend on the replacement artwork.

Some sculptures were threatened but not requisitioned in the end, such as those in the jardins de l'Europe in Annecy. Almost a thousand church bells were also requisitioned, mainly in Alsace-Lorraine, which was then part of Nazi Germany. Mobilisation continued throughout the occupation of France at varying levels of intensity according to demand. In 1943 and 1944 the central French authorities demanded that almost all monuments which had survived the first wave of the campaign in 1941 and 1942. Paradoxically the people and materials needed to requisition the statues had become almost non-existent, with no workers or vehicles left for it. After the war's end, several artworks were put back on their original pedestals in their home towns.

== Artworks lost during the mobilization ==
When the original plaster modello has also been lost, photographs remain the only trace of a statue produced in bronze.

== Bibliography ==
=== General ===
- Denton, Chad (2007). "Des poids et des mesures : La collaboration économique Franco-allemande à travers la réquisition des métaux non ferreux, une comparaison entre les zones Nord et Sud". In Joly, Hervé (ed.). L'économie de la zone non occupée : 1940-1942. CTHS-histoire (in French). Paris: CTHS. pp. 139–166. ISBN 978-2-7355-0627-9. no. 24.

=== Bells ===
- Percival Price (1948). Campanology, Europe 1945-1947: A Report on the Condition of Carillons on the Continent of Europe as a Result of the Recent War, on the Sequestration and Melting Down of Bells by the Central Powers, and on Research into the Tonal Qualities of Bells made Accessible by War-Time Dislogment. Ann Arbor: University of Michigan Press.
- Richard, Bernard (January–April 2012). "Les cloches de France sous la seconde guerre mondiale" (PDF) (in French). Patrimoine campanaire.
