= Alexandre Dumas fils =

French writer and dramatist (1824–1895)

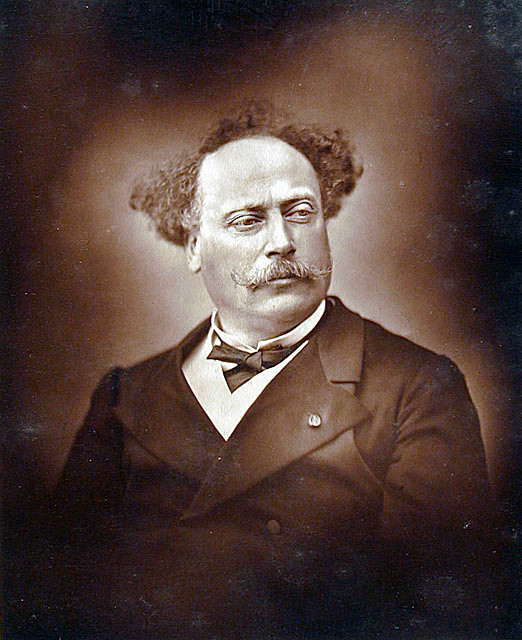
- Born: 27 July 1824; Paris, France
- Died: 27 November 1895 (aged 71); Marly-le-Roi, Yvelines, France
- Resting place: Montmartre Cemetery
- Occupations: Writer, novelist, playwright
- Spouses: Nadezhda von Knorring (m. 1864; died 1895) Henriette Régnier de La Brière (m. 1895)
- Children: 2
- Father: Alexandre Dumas
- Relatives: Alexandre Lippmann (grandson); Thomas-Alexandre Dumas (grandfather)
- Writing career
- Period: Romanticism
- Genres: Historical novel, romantic novel
- Notable awards: Légion d'honneur (1894)

Signature
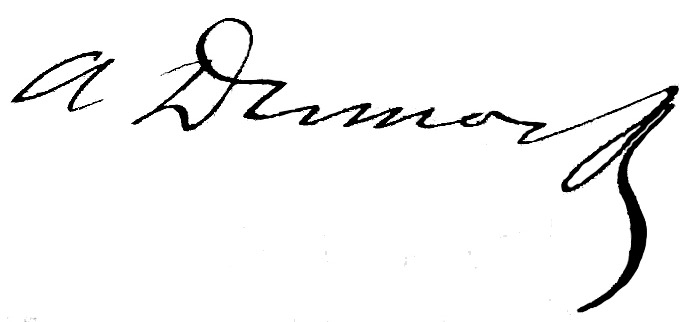

Alexandre Dumas fils (French: [alɛksɑ̃dʁ(ə) dymɑ fis]; 27 July 1824 – 27 November 1895) was a French author and playwright, best known for the romantic novel La Dame aux Camélias (The Lady of the Camellias, usually titled Camille in English-language versions), published in 1848, which was adapted into Giuseppe Verdi's 1853 opera La traviata (The Fallen Woman), as well as numerous stage and film productions about father-son relationships, such as Le Fils naturel and Un Père prodigue.

Dumas fils (French for "son") was the son of Alexandre Dumas père ("father"), also a well-known playwright and author of classic works such as The Three Musketeers and The Count of Monte Cristo. Dumas fils was admitted to the Académie française (French Academy) in 1874 and awarded the Legion of Honour in 1894.

== Biography ==
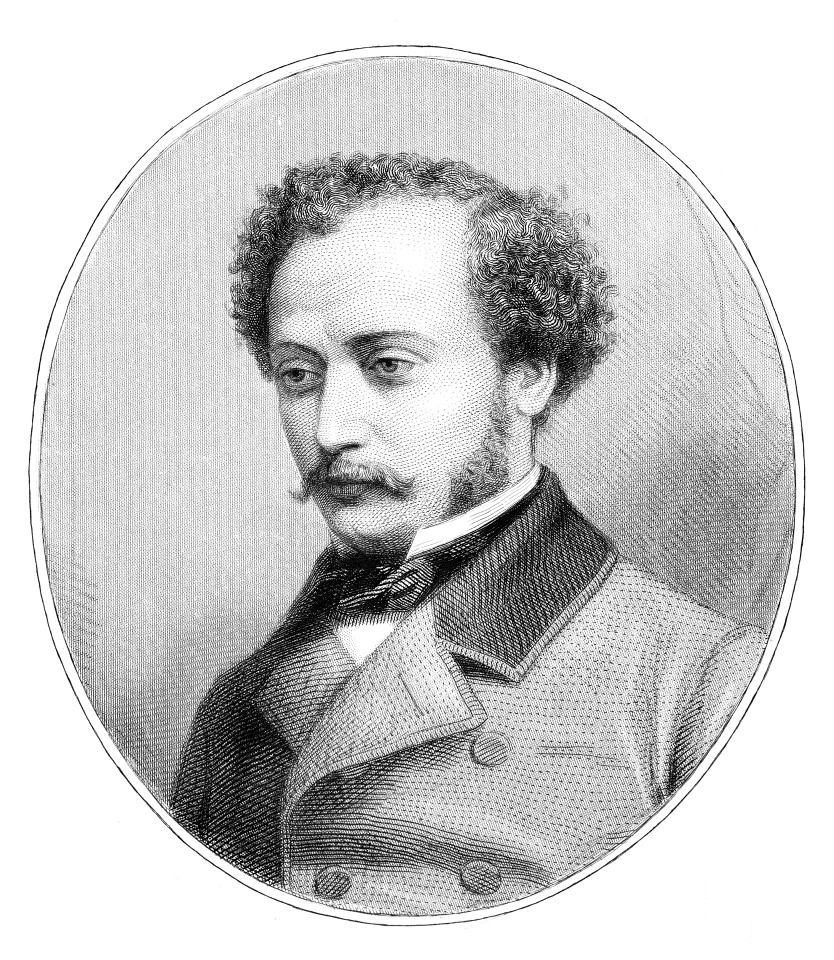
Alexandre Dumas fils, in his youth

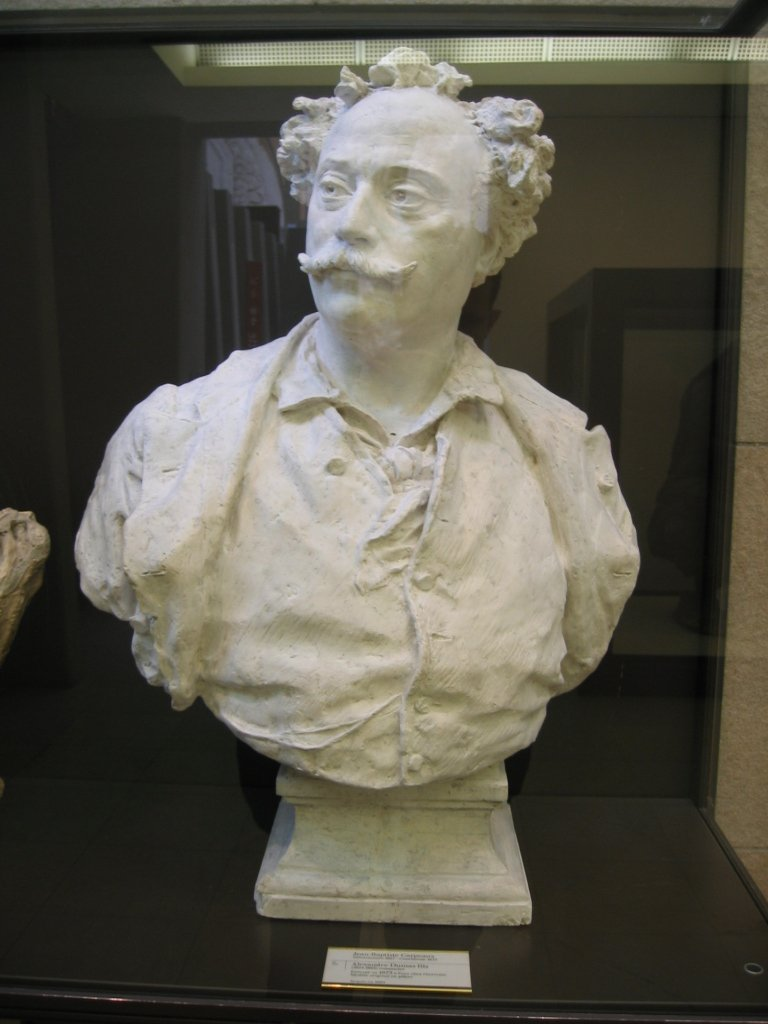
Bust of Alexander Dumas fils, by the sculptor Jean-Baptiste Carpeaux, Orsay Museum

Tomb, Montmartre Cemetery, Paris

Dumas was born in Paris, France, the illegitimate child of Marie-Laure-Catherine Labay (1794–1868), a dressmaker, and novelist Alexandre Dumas. In 1831 his father legally recognized him and ensured that the young Dumas received the best education possible at the Collège Bourbon. At that time, the law allowed the elder Dumas to take the child away from his mother. Her agony inspired the younger Dumas to write about tragic female characters. In almost all of his writings, he emphasized the moral purpose of literature; in his play Le Fils Naturel (1858) he espoused the belief that if a man fathers an illegitimate child, then he has an obligation to legitimize the child and marry the woman (see Illegitimacy in fiction). At boarding schools, he was constantly taunted by his classmates because of his family situation. These issues profoundly influenced his thoughts, behaviour, and writing.

Dumas' paternal great-grandparents were Marquis Alexandre-Antoine Davy de la Pailleterie, a Saint Dominican nobleman and Général commissaire in the Artillery in the colony of Saint-Domingue—now Haiti—and Marie-Cessette Dumas, an African woman enslaved by the Marquis. Their son Thomas-Alexandre Dumas became a high-ranking general of Revolutionary France.

In 1844, Dumas moved to Saint-Germain-en-Laye, near Paris, to live with his father. There he met Marie Duplessis, a young courtesan who would be the inspiration for the character Marguerite Gauthier in his romantic novel La Dame aux camélias (The Lady of the Camellias). Adapted into a play, it was titled Camille in English and became the basis for Verdi's 1853 opera, La traviata, Duplessis undergoing yet another name change, this time to Violetta Valéry.

Although he admitted that he had done the adaptation because he needed the money, he had great success with the play, which started his career as a dramatist. He was not only more renowned than his father during his lifetime, but also dominated the serious French stage for most of the second half of the 19th century. After this, he virtually abandoned writing novels, though his semi-autobiographical Affaire Clémenceau (1866) achieved some solid success.

On 31 December 1864, in Moscow, Dumas married Nadezhda von Knorring (1826–April 1895), daughter of Johan Reinhold von Knorring and widow of Alexander Grigorievich Narishkin. The couple had two daughters: Marie-Alexandrine-Henriette "Colette" Dumas (born 20 November 1860), who married Maurice Lippmann and was the mother of Serge Napoléon Lippmann (1886–1975) and Auguste Alexandre Lippmann (1881–1960); and Jeanine Dumas (3 May 1867–1943), who married Ernest Lecourt d'Hauterive (1864–1957), son of George Lecourt d'Hauterive and his wife, Léontine de Leusse. After Nadezhda's death, Dumas married Henriette Régnier de La Brière (1851–1934) in June 1895, without issue.

In 1874, he was admitted to the Académie française and in 1894 he was awarded the Légion d'honneur.

Dumas died at Marly-le-Roi, Yvelines, on 27 November 1895.

== Bibliography ==
=== Novels ===
- Aventures de quatre femmes et d'un perroquet (1847)
- Césarine (1848)
- La Dame aux camélias (1848) (ISBN 2-87714-205-1). Texte online (Gallica)), with a version illustrated by Albert Besnard English titled as Camellias
- Le Docteur Servan (1849)
- Antonine (1849)
- Le Roman d'une femme (1849)
- Les Quatre Restaurations. Series of historical novels in La Gazette de France titled Tristan le Roux, Henri de Navarre, Les Deux Frondes (1849–51)
- Tristan le Roux (1850)
- Trois Hommes forts (1850)
- Histoire de la loterie du lingot d'or (1851)
- Diane de Lys (1851)
- Le Régent Mustel (1852)
- Contes et Nouvelles (1853)
- La Dame aux perles (1854)
- L'Affaire Clémenceau, Mémoire de l'accusé (1866), illustrations by Albert Besnard
- L'Homme-femme (1872)

=== Opera ===
- Giuseppe Verdi's La traviata (based on The Lady of the Camellias)

=== Plays ===
- Atala (1848)
- The Lady of the Camellias (1852)
- Diane de Lys (1853)
- Le Bijou de la reine (1855)
- Le Demi-monde (1855)
- La Question d'argent (1857)
- Le Fils naturel (The Illegitimate Son, 1858)
- Un Père prodigue (1859)
- Un Mariage dans un chapeau (1859) coll. Vivier
- L'Ami des femmes (1864)
- Le Supplice d'une femme (1865) coll. Emile de Girardin
- Héloïse Paranquet (1866) coll. Durentin
- Les Idées de Madame Aubray (1867)
- Le Filleul de Pompignac (1869) coll. Francois
- Une Visite de noces (1871)
- La Princesse Georges (1871)
- La Femme de Claude (1873)
- Monsieur Alphonse (1873)
- L'Étrangère (1876)
- Les Danicheff (1876) coll. de Corvin
- La Comtesse Romani (1876) coll. Gustave Fould
- La Princesse de Bagdad (1881)
- Denise (1885)
- Francillon (1887)
- La Route de Thèbes (unfinished)

== Honours and awards ==
- Knight (chevalier) of the Order of Legion of Honour (14 August 1857)
- Officier of the Order of Legion of Honour (7 August 1867)
- Commandeur of the Order of Legion of Honour (13 July 1888)
- Grand-Officier of the Order of Legion of Honour (29th december 1894)

== See also ==
- Illegitimacy in fiction
- Legitimacy (family law)
- Museum Alexandre Dumas
