= Claude Ribbe =

French writer, activist and filmmaker (born 1954)

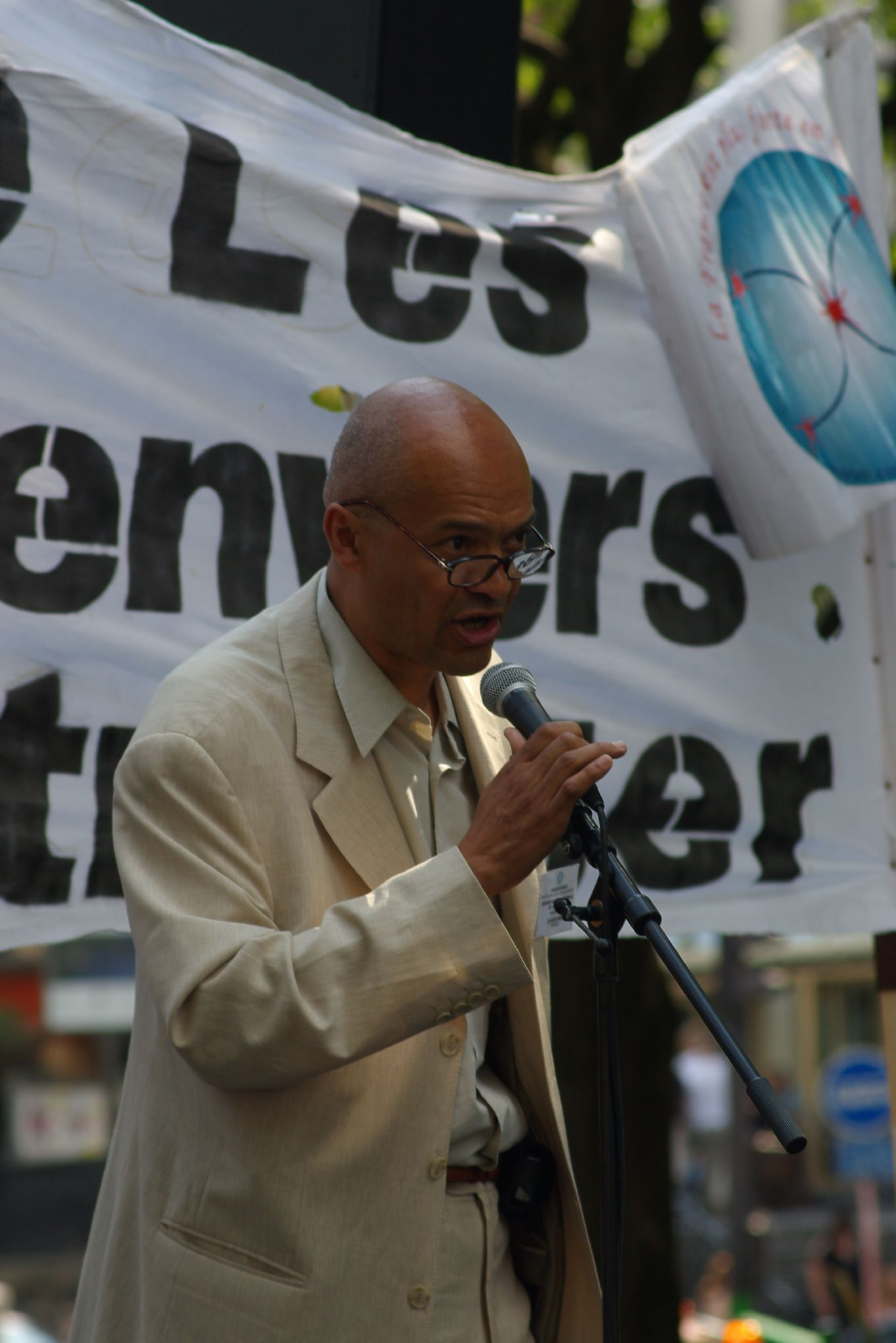
Claude Ribbe on 28 April 2007 during the Marche contre les discriminations envers les Français d'Outre-Mer, in Paris, France.

Claude Ribbe (born 13 October 1954) is a French writer, activist and filmmaker.

== Early life and education ==
Ribbe was born in Paris and is an alumnus of the Ecole normale superieure.

== Career ==
Ribbe has specialised in the history of colonialism in the Caribbean. He has also been active in promoting civil rights in France for people of ethnic African and Caribbean origin.

Through his books and films, he has supported the recognition of figures such as Eugene Bullard, Chevalier de Saint-Georges, and Thomas-Alexandre Dumas, who was the first black man to be promoted to general in the French Army in 1793.

In his book Le Crime de Napoleon (2005), Ribbe accused Napoleon of having used sulphur dioxide gas for the mass execution of more than 100,000 rebellious black slaves when trying to put down slave rebellions in Saint-Domingue (now Haiti) and Guadeloupe. He said this was a model for Hitler's holocaust nearly 140 years later.

== Books ==
- Le Cri du Centaure (2001)
- Alexandre Dumas, le dragon de la Reine (2002)
- L'Expedition (2003)
- Le chevalier de Saint-George (2004)
- Une Saison en Irak (2005)
- Le Crime de Napoleon (2005)
- Les Nègres de la République (2007)
- Le Nègre vous emmerde (2008)
- Le Diable Noir (2008)
- Mémoires du Chevalier de Saint-George (2010)
- Eugene Bullard (2012)
- Une autre histoire (2016)

== Films ==
- Le Diable Noir (2009)
- The Legendary Chevalier de Saint-George (2011)
- Eugene Bullard (2013)
