= Villers-Cotterêts =

- Commune
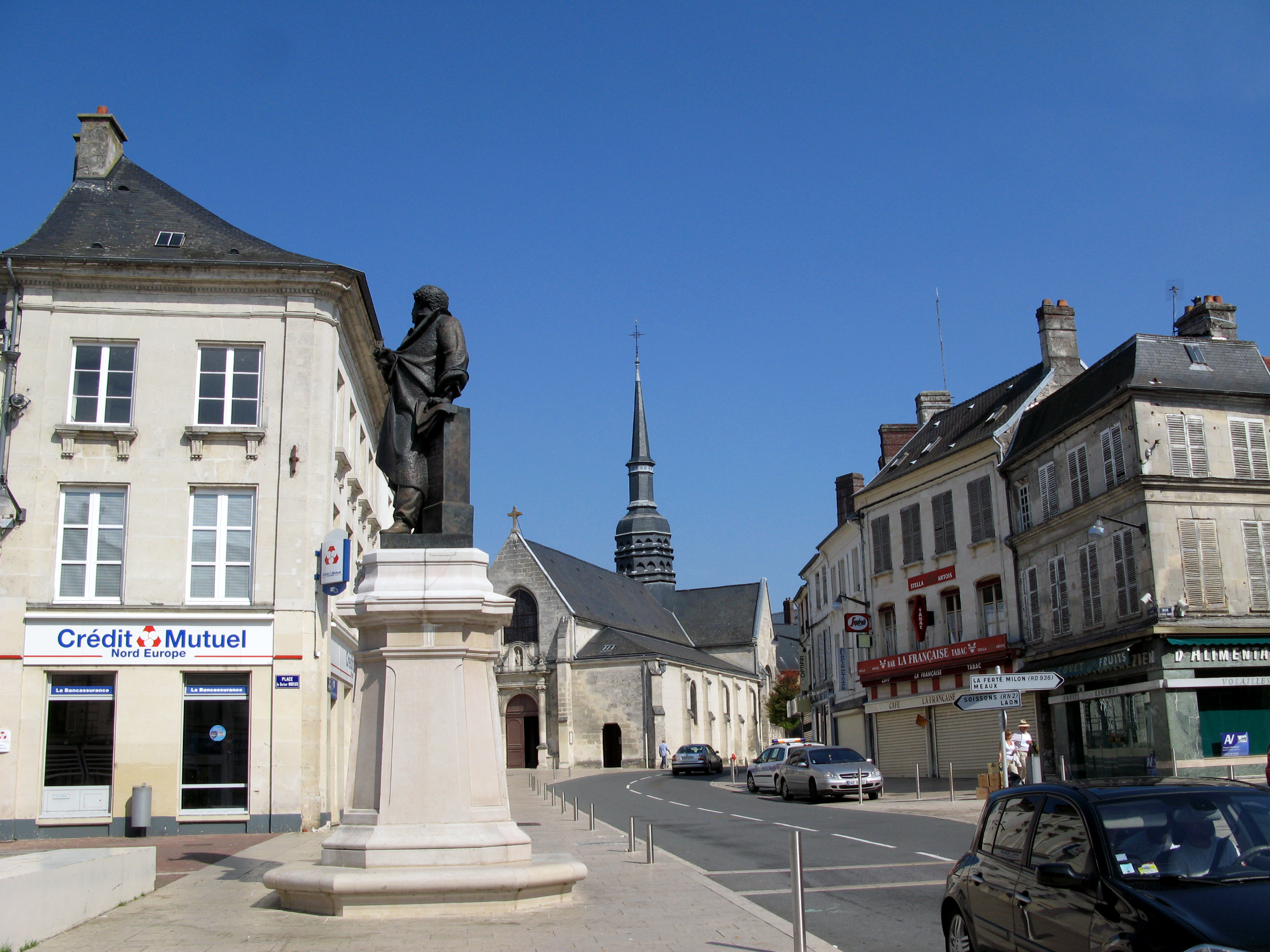
- Main square with a statue of Alexandre Dumas père and church

- Coat of arms
- Location of Villers-Cotterêts
- Location within France Location within Hauts-de-France
- Coordinates: 49°15′36″N 3°05′26″E
- Country: France
- Region: Hauts-de-France
- Department: Aisne
- Arrondissement: Soissons
- Canton: Villers-Cotterêts

Government
  - Mayor (2026–32): Jeanne Roussel
- Area^{1}: 41.71 km^{2} (16.10 sq mi)
- Elevation: 120 m (390 ft)
- Highest elevation: 226 m (741 ft)
- Lowest elevation: 65 m (213 ft)
- Population (2023): 10,489
  - Density: 251.5/km^{2} (651.3/sq mi)
- Time zone: UTC+01:00 (CET)
  - Summer (DST): UTC+02:00 (CEST)
- INSEE/Postal code: 02810 /02600
- ^{1} French Land Register data, which excludes lakes, ponds, glaciers > 1 km^{2} (0.386 sq mi or 247 acres) and river estuaries.

Villers-Cotterêts (pronounced [vilɛʁ kɔt(ə)ʁɛ]) is a commune in the Aisne department in Hauts-de-France, France. It is notable as the signing-place in 1539 of the Ordinance of Villers-Cotterêts discontinuing the use of Latin in official French documents, and as the birthplace in 1802 of French novelist Alexandre Dumas père.

== Geography ==
It is located 80 km (50 mi) NE of Paris via the RN2 heading towards Laon. Its nickname Petite ville sur la côte de Retz means Little town on the slopes of Retz, as it is situated next to the Forest of Retz, which covers 130 km^{2} (50 sq mi) of land.

== History ==
Villers-Cotterêts is famous in French law because of the Ordinance of Villers-Cotterêts of 1539 signed by king Francis I of France ('François Ier'), which made French the official language in the kingdom instead of regional languages like Occitan or the elite European lingua franca of the time, Latin.

In 1914, the British Expeditionary Force fought a rearguard action here during the Retreat from Mons. On 1 September, the British 4th (Guards) Brigade who were covering the withdrawal of 2nd Division, came into contact with the leading units of the German III Corps on the edge of woodland near Villers-Cotterêts. The brigade lost more than 300 men in the encounter, but were able to break away and continue the withdrawal. Many are buried at Guards' Grave, a military cemetery maintained by the Commonwealth War Graves Commission. An ancillary hospital to that of Royaumont was set up in the town and a silent documentary about it was made.

La Plaine Saint-Rémy, Pisseleux, was an ancient commune that was merged with Villers-Cotterêts in 1971.

== Population ==
The inhabitants are called Cottevreziens in French.

Historical population

Year	Pop.	±% p.a.
1793	2,400	—
1800	2,327	−0.44%
1806	2,273	−0.39%
1821	2,543	+0.75%
1831	2,688	+0.56%
1836	2,692	+0.03%
1841	3,481	+5.28%
1846	3,465	−0.09%
1851	3,602	+0.78%
1856	2,609	−6.25%
1861	2,764	+1.16%
1866	3,396	+4.20%
1872	3,119	−1.41%
1876	3,206	+0.69%
1881	3,811	+3.52%
1886	3,790	−0.11%
1891	4,582	+3.87%
1896	4,772	+0.82%
1901	4,981	+0.86%

Year	Pop.	±% p.a.
1906	5,381	+1.56%
1911	5,654	+0.99%
1921	4,208	−2.91%
1926	4,610	+1.84%
1931	4,612	+0.01%
1936	5,070	+1.91%
1946	3,607	−3.35%
1954	3,917	+1.04%
1962	5,489	+4.31%
1968	6,313	+2.36%
1975	8,949	+5.11%
1982	8,380	−0.93%
1990	8,867	+0.71%
1999	9,839	+1.16%
2007	10,090	+0.32%
2012	10,669	+1.12%
2017	10,872	+0.38%
2023	10,489	−0.60%

Source: EHESS and INSEE (1968-2023)

== Notable residents ==
- Charles Baur (1929–2015), Mayor of Villers-Cotterêts (1953–1989), President of the Regional Council of Picardy (1976–1978, 1985–2004)

== Sports ==
The town was the start of Stage 4 in the 2007 Tour de France.

== Sights ==
The original château was built around 950 AD and was burnt to the ground twice before being rebuilt out of stone in the early 12th century. The front entrance is the only original remaining structure, which is listed with the Historic Monument Registry at the École des Beaux Arts. Francis I purchased the château from the de Noüe family to house his mistress Anne de Pisseleu d'Heilly. The Château de Noüe was updated with 18th-century régence decoration by Gilles-Marie Oppenordt. The current owner is the Pépinières du Valois, an agricultural venture.

In 1902 the city opened a Museum Alexandre Dumas to gather souvenirs about the family. In 1952 the museum moved to a local 19th century mansion that served as General Maunoury's headquarters during the First World War. It has three rooms, each of them dedicated to one of the family members, being the general Thomas-Alexandre Dumas, his son novelist Alexandre Dumas père and grandson novelist/playwright Alexandre Dumas fils.

== See also ==
- Communes of the Aisne department

== Gallery ==
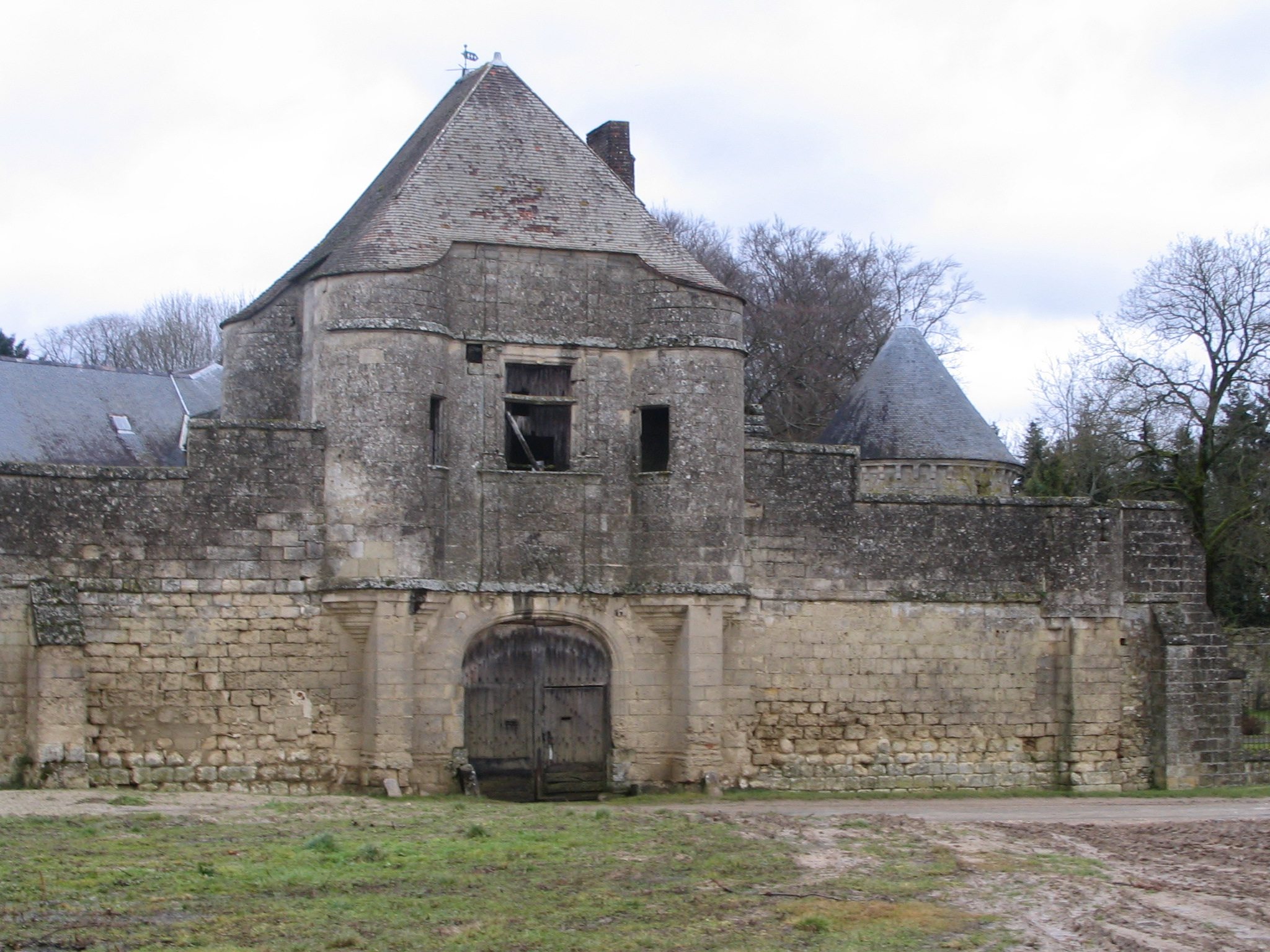
The 16th century Château de Noüe

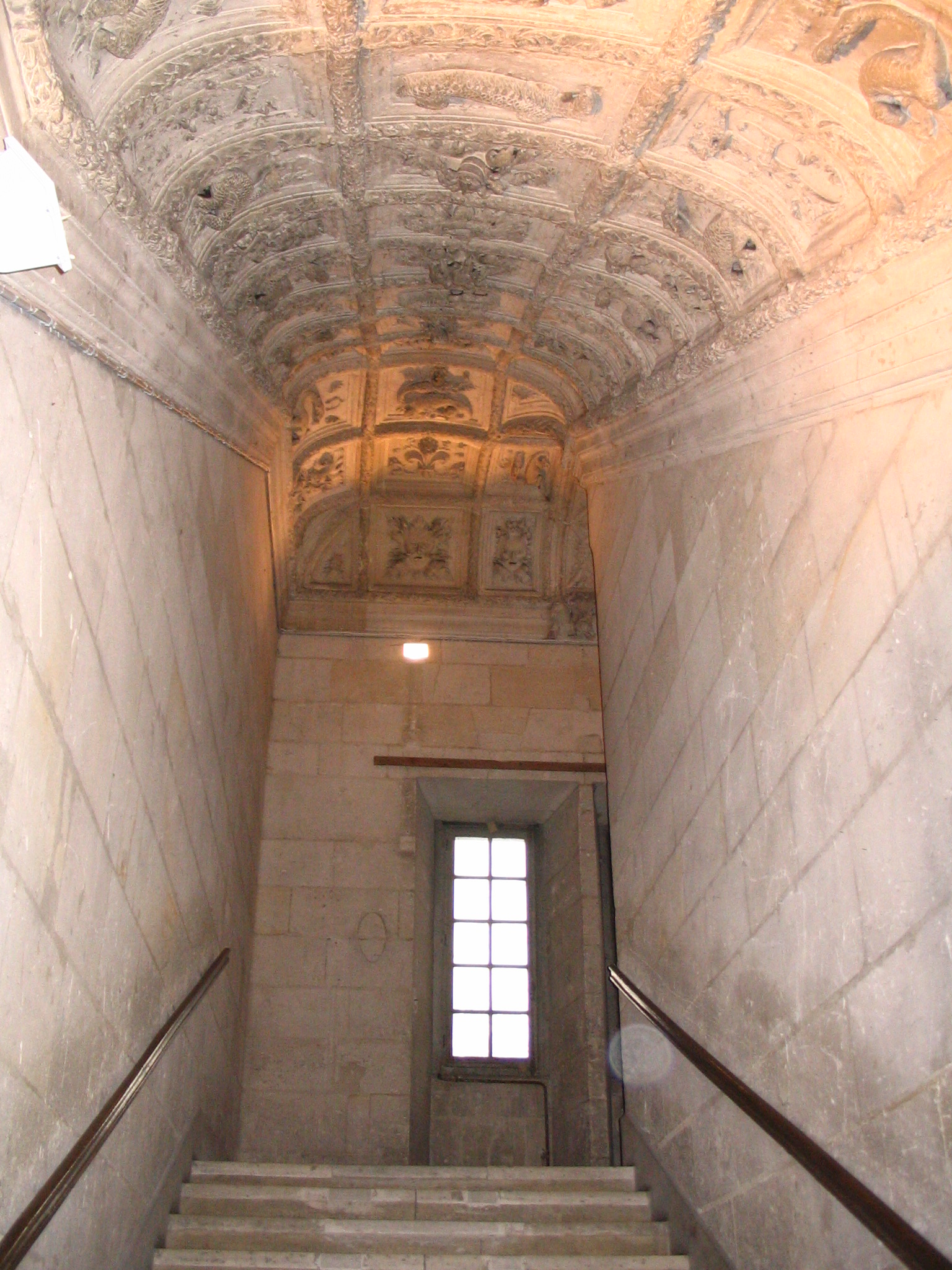
One of the very decorated staircases of the castle where King Francis I signed the Ordinance of Villers-Cotterêts.

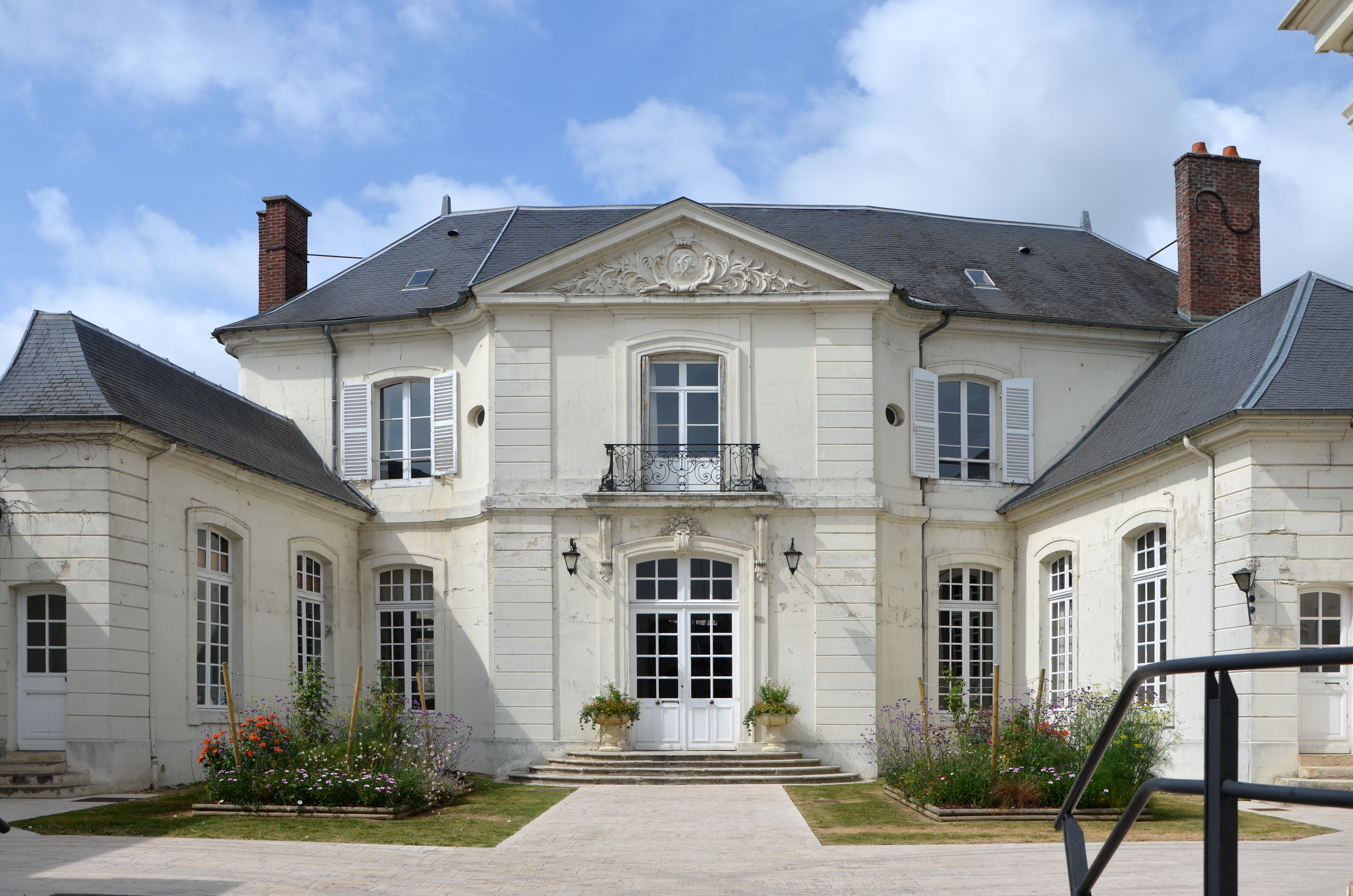
Villers-Cotterêts town hall
