= Château de Villers-Cotterêts =

Castle in Villers-Cotterêts, France

Coordinates: 49°15′21″N 3°05′32″E

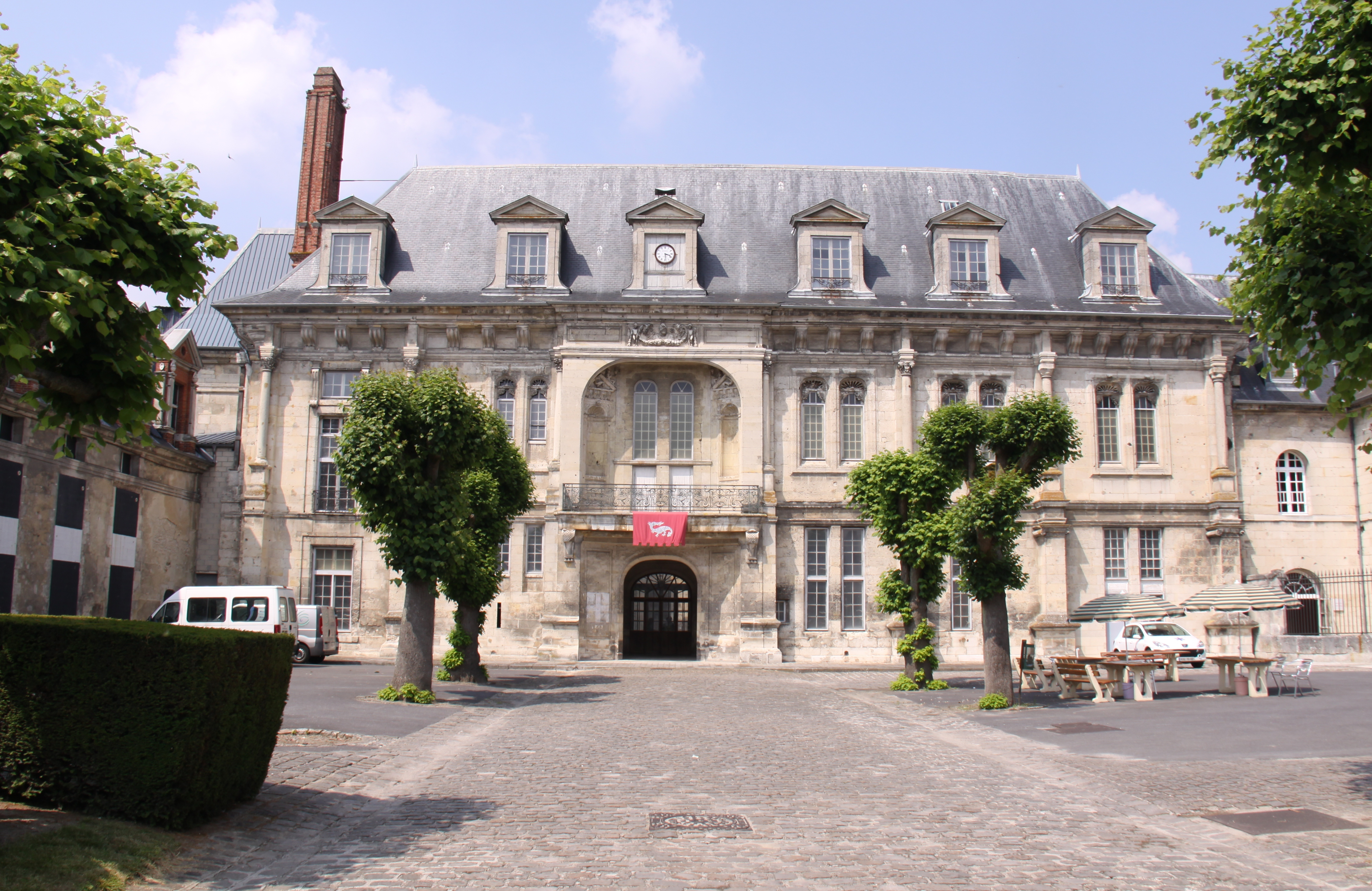
- Interactive map of the Château de Villers-Cotterêts area

General information
- Type: Château
- Architectural style: French Renaissance
- Location: Villers-Cotterêts, France
- Construction started: 1530
- Completed: 1556
- Owner: Government of France

Design and construction
- Architects: Jacques Lebreton, Guillaume Lebreton, Philibert de l'Orme

The Château de Villers-Cotterêts (pronounced [ʃɑto d(ə) vilɛʁ kɔt(ə)ʁɛ]) is a historic French château located in the town of Villers-Cotterêts in the Aisne department, Hauts-de-France, about 80 kilometres (50 miles) north-east of Paris.

It is a state property and a historic monument since 1997.

== History ==
=== Original construction ===
The castle was built for Francis I of France on the edge of the Forest of Retz.

In 1539, Francis I of France signed the Ordinance of Villers-Cotterêts which made the use of the French language mandatory in the acts of administration and justice.

In 1661, Louis XIV granted the castle to his brother Philippe I, Duke of Orléans. It remained with the House of Orléans until the Revolution.

In 1787 Louis Philippe II, Duke of Orléans was exiled to the château over opposition to the May Edicts in 1787.

=== Revolution and aftermath ===
In 1790, the castle was seized as national property.

Napoleon turned it into a beggar's home, a prison and a hospice in 1808. It then became a retirement home in 1889 until the end of 2014.

=== 21st century restoration ===
In 2023, following a colossal restoration campaign, president Emmanuel Macron turned the castle into the Cité Internationale de la Langue Française, dedicated to the French language.
