= Le roman d'Elvire =

- Opera by Ambroise Thomas
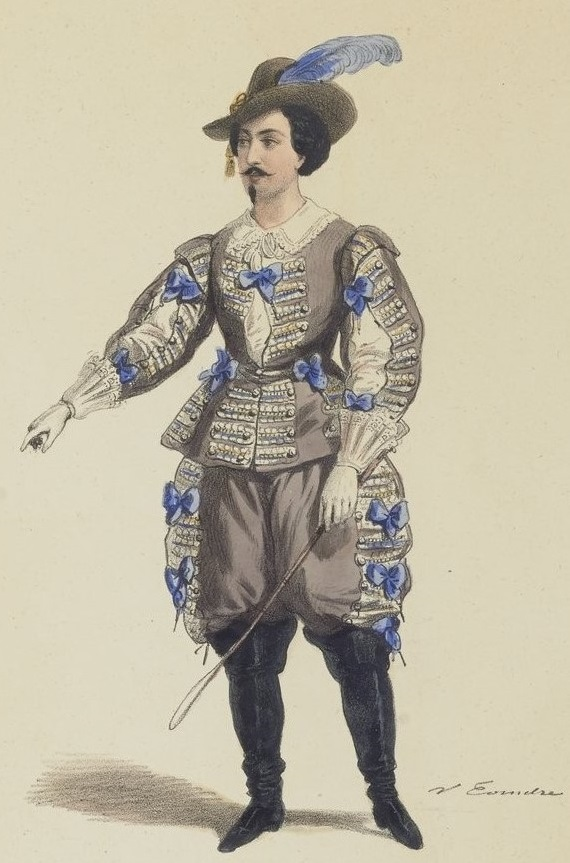
- Achille-Félix Montaubry as Gennaro in the premiere production
- Other title: Fantaisie de marquise
- Librettist: Alexandre Dumas; Adolphe de Leuven
- Language: French
- Premiere: 4 February 1860; Opéra-Comique, Paris

Le roman d'Elvire is an opéra comique in three acts composed by Ambroise Thomas to a libretto by Alexandre Dumas (père) and Adolphe de Leuven. Also performed under the title Fantaisie de marquise, it was premiered on 4 February 1860 by the Théâtre Impérial de l'Opéra-Comique at the second Salle Favart theatre. Set in 17th-century Palermo, the opera blends elements of realism and fairy tale in its story of a young libertine who discovers that the wealthy old woman he thought he had married is actually the young and beautiful one whom he had jilted.

== Background and performance history ==
Although he was a prolific novelist and playwright, Alexandre Dumas rarely ventured into writing for the opera stage. Le roman d'Elvire was his fourth and last such work. (Note: Dumas's previous libretti were Piquillo set by Hippolyte Monpou (1837), Samson set by Gilbert Duprez (1856), and La Bacchante set by Eugène Gautier (1858)) His collaborator was Adolphe de Leuven who had co-written the librettos of four earlier operas composed by Thomas, all of them in the opéra comique genre. The Théâtre Impérial de l'Opéra-Comique premiered Le roman d'Elvire on 4 February 1860 with Achille-Félix Montaubry and Mademoiselle Monrose in the lead roles of Gennaro and Elvire. The production was directed by Toussaint-Eugène-Ernest Mocker. The opera ran for 33 performances, but its mixed reviews and lukewarm reception led Thomas to abandon opera composition for the next six years. He would return in 1866 with Mignon which proved to be a great success both in France and abroad.

== Roles ==
Role	Voice type	Premiere cast 4 February 1860
Gennaro, le chevalier d'Albani	tenor	Achille-Félix Montaubry
Malatesta, chief of police	bass	Victor Prilleux
Elvire, la marquise de Villa Bianca	soprano	Mademoiselle Monrose
Lilla, a young fortune-teller	mezzo-soprano	Marie-Charlotte Lemercier
Ascanio, Gennaro's friend	baritone	Eugène Charles Antoine Crosti
Aniello, a spy	tenor	Louis Caussade
Lelio, Gennaro's friend		Coutan
Leoni, Gennaro's friend		Andrieu
Marco, Gennaro's friend		Lejeune
Servants, money-lenders and their henchmen, officers of the law, men and women of Palermo

== Synopsis ==
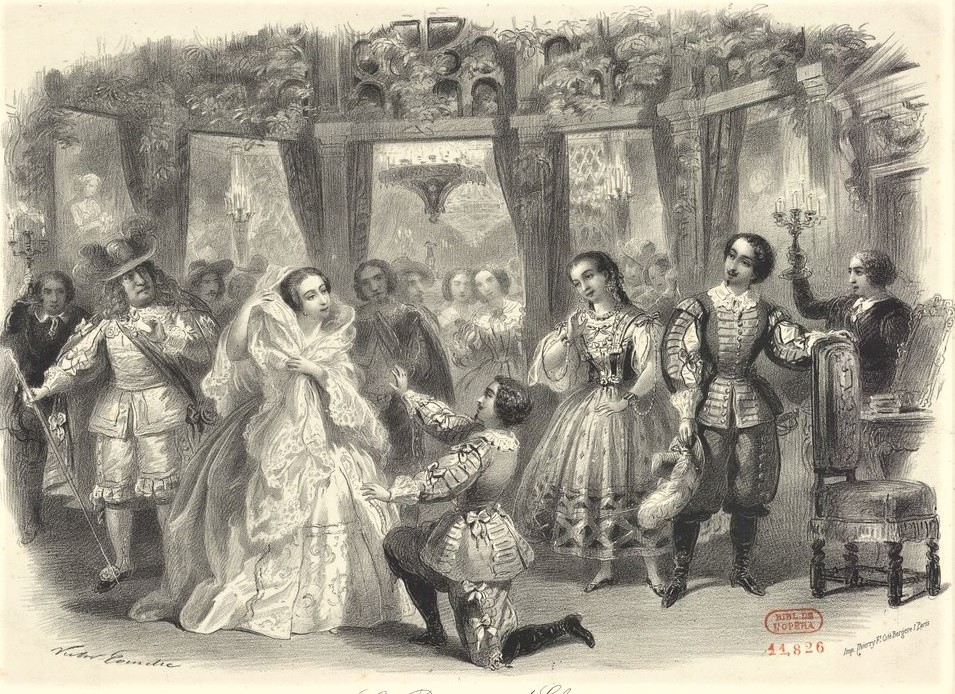
Gennaro kneels before Elvire in the climax of Act 3

Setting: Palermo in 1600

The young libertine Gennaro d'Abani refuses to marry the beautiful, and wealthy Elvire, preferring instead a life of unfettered dissipation and the pursuit of his dream to become a wealthy diamond merchant. To exact her revenge, Elvire conceives the idea of passing herself off as an old woman via the magic potions provided by Lilla, a gypsy fortune-teller. Under this guise she attracts the courtship of Malatesta, Palermo's chief of police. In the interim, Gennaro's financial ventures have failed and he is being pursued by an army of moneylenders and their henchmen. In his desperation he accepts an offer of marriage from the "old woman" and the financial protection she can provide.

However, Gennaro chafes under the tight leash on which the elderly Elvire now keeps him and concocts a plot to flee. He arranges for Lilla to administer a sleeping potion to Elvire which will allow him to escape from her house. Instead, Lilla administers a potion which turns Elvire back to a beautiful young woman. The people of Palermo are convinced that Gennaro has murdered his wife and has replaced her with this new young woman. He is prosecuted by Malatesta and about to be hanged. To save her husband, Elvire offers to take another potion which will turn her back into an old woman. Horrified at the prospect, Gennaro professes that he would rather be hanged. At this proof of his love and reformed ways, Elvire reveals the truth of what has happened and the couple are set to live happily ever after.

== Recordings ==
- aria Act II: Récitatif et air. "Ah ! Vive Dieu !. . . Suprême puissance" (Gennaro) Cyrille Dubois Orchestre National de Lille Pierre Dumoussaud. Alpha 2023
