= Le Corricolo =

1841–1843 travelogue by Alexandre Dumas

Sketches of Naples
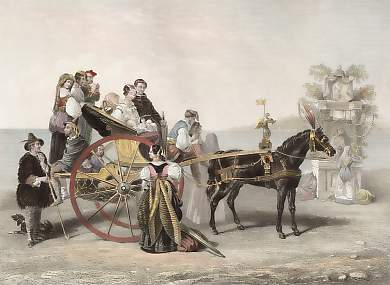
- A corricolo in Naples in 1850
- Author: Alexandre Dumas
- Original title: Le Corricolo
- Language: French
- Genre: Travel book
- Publication date: 1841 – 1843
- Publication place: France

Le Corricolo, published in English as Sketches of Naples, is a work by Alexandre Dumas published in 1843, in which he recalls the trip he made from Rome to Naples in 1835, with the painter Louis Godefroy Jadin. In the work Dumas alternates episodes he experienced with others coming from the popular tradition.

== The trip to Italy ==
The original idea of Dumas was a trip along the coast of the whole Mediterranean. This trip should have given him material for a travel book. In order to do that, in 1834 he launched several subscriptions, but he was unable to raise the entire sum needed for the trip. So, he had to reduce the scope of his trip to southern Italy, and it is likely that Dumas had tried to get in touch with revolutionary and Mazzinian elements in the Kingdom of the Two Sicilies, with a view to an anti-Bourbon uprising. On 12 May 1835 he left together with his friend Louis Godefroy Jadin, a painter, Jadin's dog, Milord, his mistress and later wife, Ida Ferrier, and her sister. Passing through Toulon, Nice, Genoa, Livorno, Pisa and Florence (where he arrived on 1 July) he reached Rome, where he asked Ferdinand II's ambassador for permission to visit the Kingdom of the Two Sicilies. Unfortunately, he had been denounced as a republican agitator and was banned from visiting the kingdom. Due to that, he traveled to the Kingdom of the Two Sicilies using the name of Joseph Guichard, a painter and resident of the French Academy at Villa Medici. He traveled clandestinely, always accompanied by his friends, and, after reaching Naples, where he left his lover, he embarked for Sicily on a small boat and was joined by the contralto Caroline Ungher, who became his lover during the trip. He returned to Naples at the end of October 1835 and found Ida, but he was forced to leave the city on 23 November, after only three weeks, after being denounced. Dumas had to wait ten years for the final draft of the romance, time which allowed him to search for literary sources to make the work richer.

== Description ==
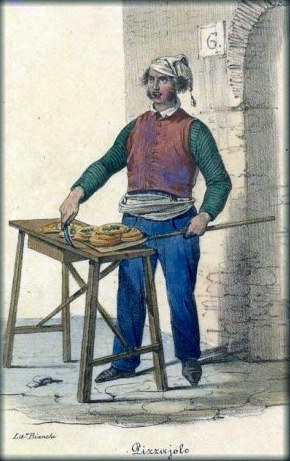
A Pizzajolo ("pizza baker") in Naples, ca. 1830

Published in four volumes, which came out between 1841 and 1843, Le Corricolo collects a series of tales inspired by anecdotes, stories, portraits, puns and stories of excursions, that Alexandre Dumas recorded in 1835, when he visited Naples and southern Italy, so much so that, in the English edition, it was published under the title Sketches of Naples. It concludes the author's impressions of his travels in the Kingdom of Naples with his stay in Naples, following on from the two volumes Speronare and Capitaine Aréna, which recounted his travels respectively in Sicily and Calabria with the Aeolian Islands.

A widespread literary tradition has attributed the work to Pier Angelo Fiorentino, one of the French novelist's collaborators, whom the writer got to know during his trip to Italy in 1835, which provided him with the material for this book.

The title refers to the means of transport Dumas used to visit the Naples area. As Dumas explains, "Le Corricolo is a kind of tilbury originally intended to hold one person and to be hitched to a horse; it is hitched to two horses, and carries from twelve to fifteen people."

In Le Corricolo Dumas alternates episodes he witnessed or were told to him with others coming from the popular tradition.

Of the tales included in it, many of which were inspired, according to Benedetto Croce, by anecdotes published in 1830 by Michele Palmieri di Micciché, those on the Lazzaroni and those on the evil eye have attracted particular attention from a socio-anthropological perspective.

The book is also noteworthy because it contains one of the first literary accounts of Neapolitan pizza, which Dumas uses to make a socio-economic analysis of the city:

Pizza is: with oil; with bacon; with lard; with cheese; with tomatoes; with small fish. It is the gastronomic thermometer of the market: it rises or falls in price according to the course of the aforementioned ingredients, according to the abundance or famine of the year.

== Sources ==
- Raffaele de Cesare (1997). "Il viaggio di A. Dumas in Italia nel 1835". Aevum (in Italian). 3 (September-December 1997): 801–860.
