= The Women's War =

The Women's War may refer to:

- The Women's War (film) (German: Der Weiberkrieg), a 1928 German silent film directed by Franz Seitz
- The Women's War (novel), modern English translation title of novel La guerre des femmes by Dumas
- The Women's War (podcast), podcast by conflict journalist Robert Evans about Rojava
- Women's War, local Igbo name for the 1929 protests called the Aba Riots by the British
