= Speak Your Mind (disambiguation) =

Speak Your Mind is a 2018 album by Anne-Marie.

== Film, radio and TV ==
- Speak Your Mind, early Canadian radio talk show hosted by Larry Solway then John Gilbert
- Speak Your Mind, film starring Paul Nicholas Mason

== Music ==
=== Albums ===
- Speak Your Mind, a 2008 album by Ian Kelly
- Speak Your Mind, a 2009 album by Cindy Valentine
- Speak Your Mind, a 2014 album by The/Das

=== Songs ===
- "Speak Your Mind", a 1972 song by Yvonne Elliman from Yvonne Elliman, originally by Marc Benno
- "Speak Your Mind", song by 12 Stones from Potter's Field
- "Speak Your Mind", song by The Toasters from Hard Band for Dead
- "Speak Your Mind", song by Immortal Technique from Revolutionary Vol. 1
- "Speak Your Mind", song by Glenn Hughes from Feel
- "Speak Your Mind", song by Kevin Moore from Rainmaker
- "Speak Your Mind", song by Biro Funk
- "Speak Your Mind", song by Joe Firstman from The War of Women

== Other ==
- Speak Your Mind, a 2007 book by Dmitry Gordon
