= Alexandre Dumas =

French writer and dramatist (1802–1870)

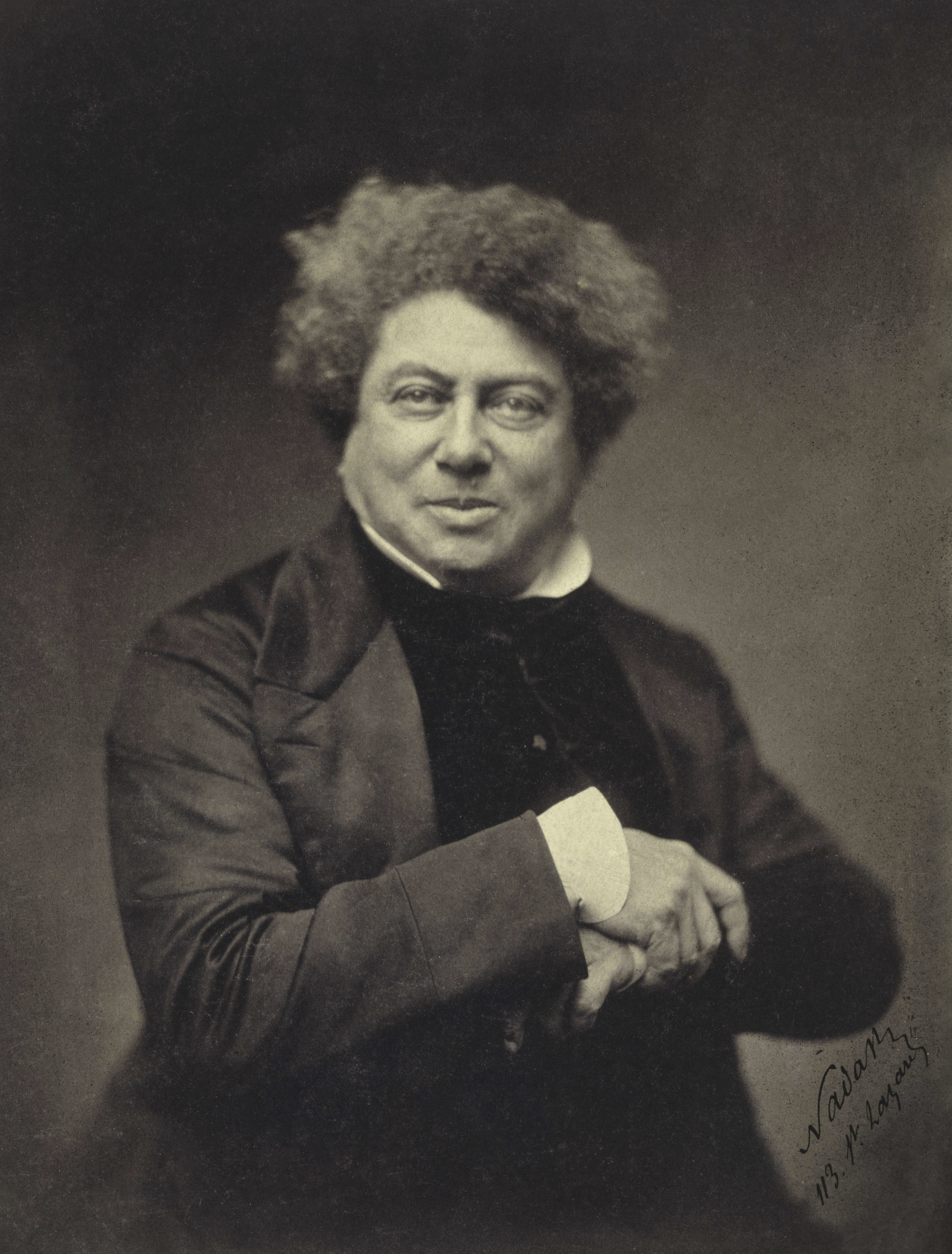
- Dumas in 1855
- Born: Alexandre Davy de la Pailleterie; 24 July 1802; Villers-Cotterêts, Picardy, France
- Died: 5 December 1870 (aged 68); Neuville-lès-Dieppe, Seine-Basse, France
- Occupations: Novelist; playwright
- Spouse: Ida Ferrier (m. 1840; died 1859)
- Children: 4, including Alexandre Dumas fils (illegitimate son)
- Father: Thomas-Alexandre Dumas
- Relatives: Marie-Cessette Dumas (paternal grandmother); Alexandre Lippmann (great-grandson)
- Writing career
- Period: 1829–1869
- Notable works: The Three Musketeers (1844); The Count of Monte Cristo (1844–1846); The Man in the Iron Mask (1847–1850)
- Movements: Romanticism and historical fiction

Alexandre Dumas (Note: UK: /ˈdjuːmɑː, dʊˈmɑː/, US: /duːˈmɑː/; French: [alɛksɑ̃dʁ(ə) dymɑ]) (born Alexandre Davy de la Pailleterie; (Note: French: [alɛksɑ̃dʁ davi də la pajət(ə)ʁi]) 24 July 1802 – 5 December 1870), also known as Alexandre Dumas père, (Note: The père is French for 'father', to distinguish him from his son Alexandre Dumas fils.) was a French novelist and playwright.

His works have been translated into many languages and he is one of the most widely read French authors. Many of his historical novels of adventure were originally published as serials, including The Count of Monte Cristo, The Three Musketeers, Twenty Years After and The Vicomte of Bragelonne: Ten Years Later. He also wrote many plays and, since the early 20th century, many of his novels have been adapted into films. Prolific in several genres, Dumas began his career by writing plays, which were successfully produced from the first. He wrote numerous magazine articles and travel books; his published works totalled 100,000 pages. In the 1840s, Dumas founded the Théâtre Historique in Paris.

His father, General Thomas-Alexandre Dumas, né Davy de la Pailleterie, was born in the French colony of Saint-Domingue (present-day Haiti) to Alexandre Antoine Davy de la Pailleterie, a French nobleman, and Marie-Cessette Dumas, an African slave. At age 14, Thomas-Alexandre was taken by his father to France, where he was given his freedom, educated in a military academy, and entered the military for what became an illustrious career.

Alexandre acquired work with Louis-Philippe, Duke of Orléans, then as a writer, a career that led to his early success. Decades later, after the election of Louis-Napoléon Bonaparte in 1851, Dumas fell from favour and left France for Belgium, where he stayed for several years. He moved to Russia for a few years and then to Italy. In 1861, he founded and published the newspaper L'Indépendant, which supported Italian unification. He returned to Paris in 1864.

English playwright Watts Phillips, who knew Dumas in his later life, described him as "the most generous, large-hearted being in the world. He also was the most delightfully amusing and egotistical creature on the face of the earth. His tongue was like a windmill—once set in motion, you would never know when he would stop, especially if the theme was himself."

== Birth and family ==
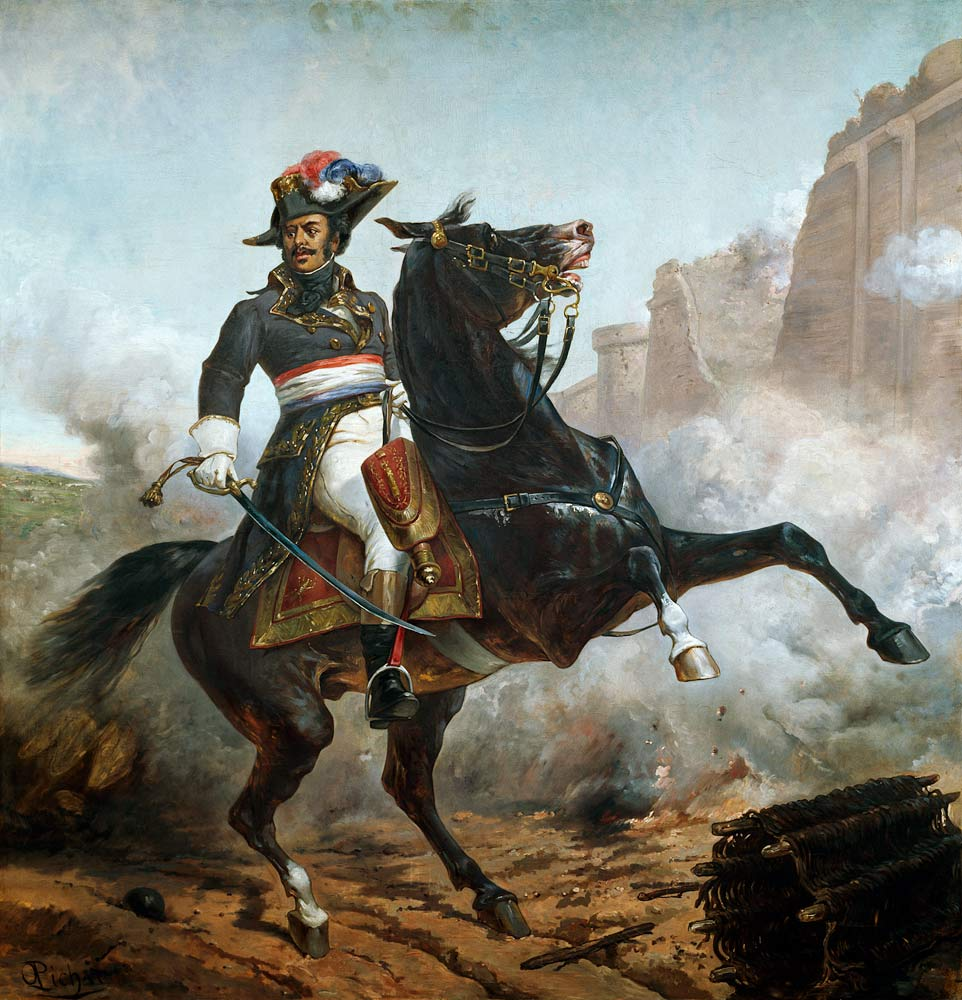
General Thomas-Alexandre Dumas, father of Alexandre Dumas

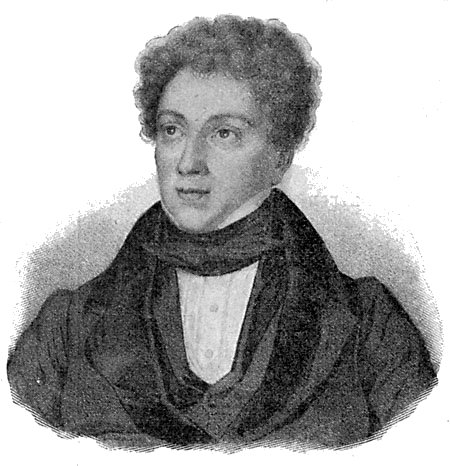
Alexandre Dumas, engraving by Antoine Maurin

Alexandre Davy de la Pailleterie (later known as Alexandre Dumas) was born in 1802 in Villers-Cotterêts in the department of Aisne, in Picardy, France. He had two older sisters, Marie-Alexandrine (born 1794) and Louise-Alexandrine (1796–1797). Their parents were Marie-Louise Élisabeth Labouret, the daughter of an innkeeper, and Thomas-Alexandre Dumas.

Thomas-Alexandre was born in the French colony of Saint-Domingue (now Haiti), the mixed-race, natural son of the Marquis Alexandre Antoine Davy de la Pailleterie (Antoine), a French nobleman and général commissaire in the artillery of the colony, and Marie-Cessette Dumas, an enslaved woman of Afro-Caribbean ancestry. The two extant primary documents that state a racial identity for Marie-Cessette Dumas refer to her as a "négresse" (a black woman) as opposed to a "mulâtresse" (a woman of visible mixed race). It is unknown whether Marie-Cessette was born in Saint-Domingue or in Africa, nor is it known from which African people she had ancestry. What is known is that, sometime after becoming estranged from his brothers, Antoine purchased Marie-Cessette and her daughter from a previous relationship for "an exorbitant amount" and made Marie-Cessette his concubine. Thomas-Alexandre was the only son born to them, but they had two or three daughters.

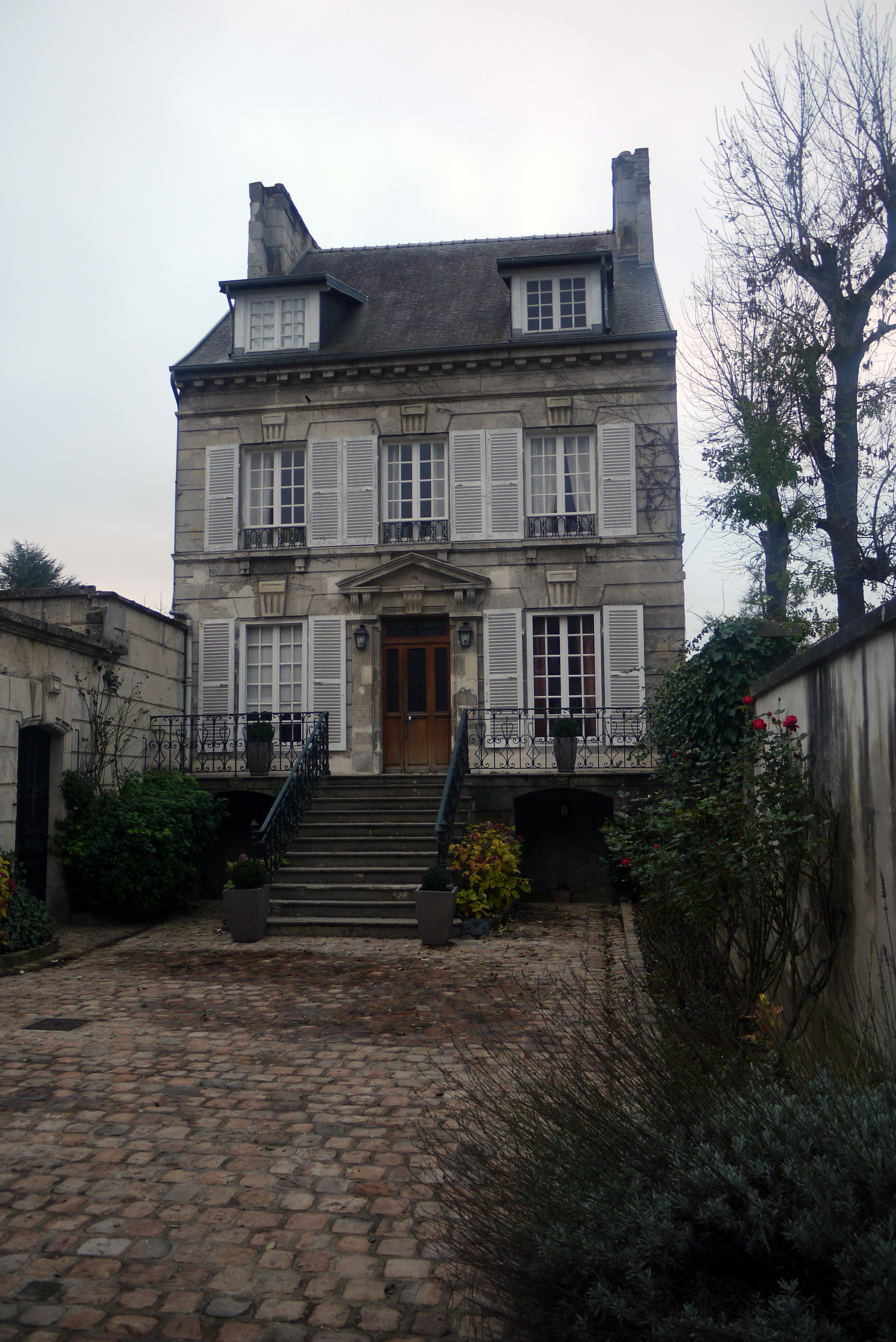
Birthplace of Alexandre Dumas in Villers-Cotterêts

In 1775, following the death of both his brothers, Antoine left Saint-Domingue for France in order to claim the family estates and the title of Marquis. Shortly before his departure, he sold Marie-Cessette and their two daughters (Adolphe and Jeanette), as well as Marie-Cessette's oldest daughter Marie-Rose (whose father was a different man) to a baron who had recently come from Nantes to settle in Saint Domingue. Antoine, however, retained ownership of Thomas-Alexandre (his only natural son) and took the 14-year-old boy with him to France. There, Thomas-Alexandre received his freedom and a sparse education at a military school, adequate to enable him to join the French army, there being no question of the mixed-race boy being accepted as his father's heir. Thomas-Alexandre did well in the Army and was promoted to general by the age of 31, the first soldier of Afro-Antilles origin to reach that rank in the French army.

The family surname ("de la Pailleterie") was never bestowed upon Thomas-Alexandre, who therefore used "Dumas" as his surname. This is often assumed to have been his mother's surname, but in fact, the surname "Dumas" occurs only once in connection with Marie-Cessette, and that happens in Europe, when Thomas-Alexandre states, while applying for a marriage licence, that his mother's name was "Marie-Cessette Dumas". Some scholars have suggested that Thomas-Alexandre devised the surname "Dumas" for himself when he felt the need for one, and that he attributed it to his mother when convenient. "Dumas" means "of the farm" (du mas), perhaps signifying only that Marie-Cessette belonged to the farm property.

== Career ==
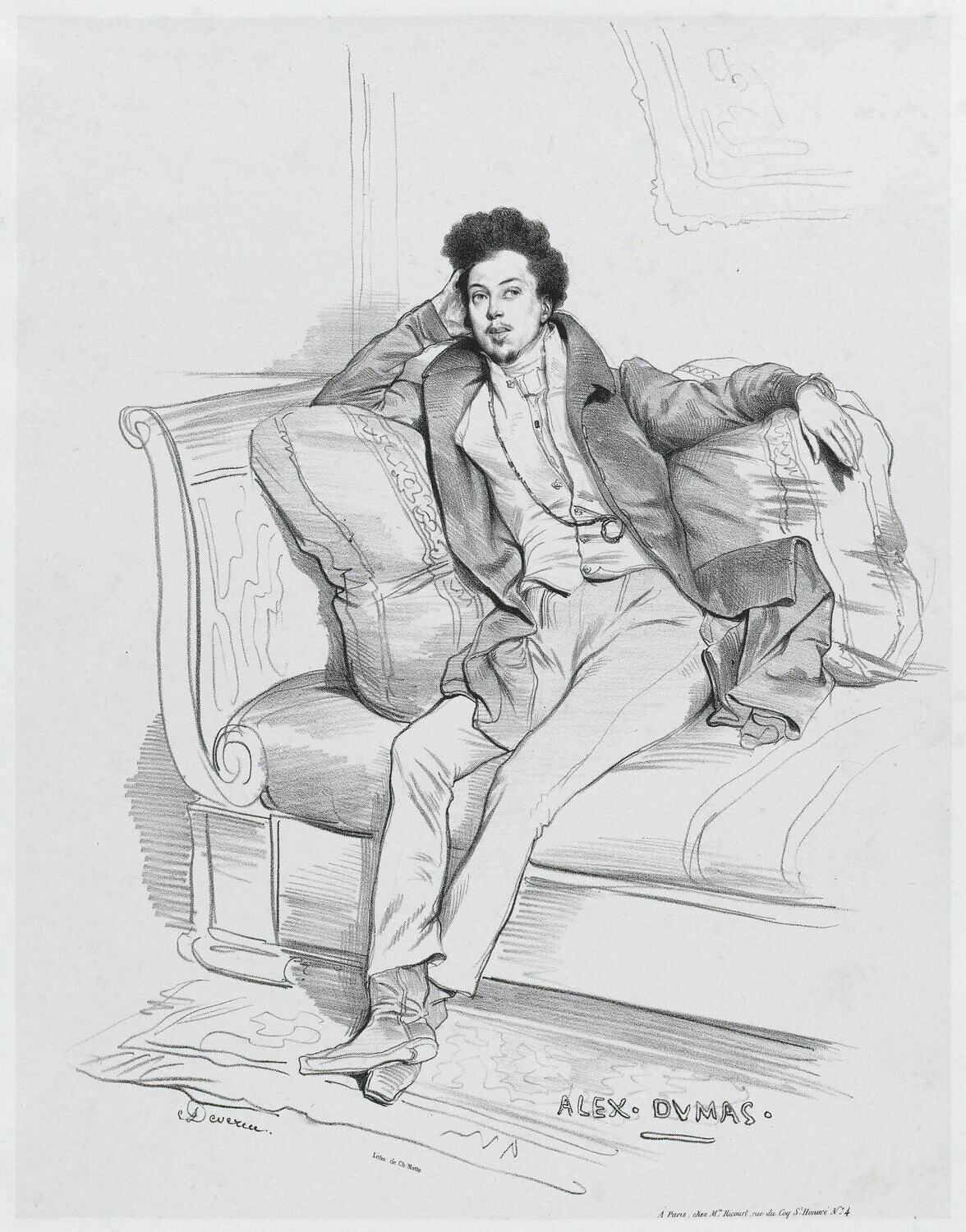
Alexandre Dumas by Achille Devéria (1829)

While working for Louis-Philippe, Alexandre Dumas began writing articles for magazines and plays for the theatre. As an adult, he used the surname of Dumas, as his father had done as an adult. His first play, Henry III and His Court, produced in 1829 when he was 27 years old, met with acclaim. His second play, Christine, was equally popular the next year. These successes gave him sufficient income to write full-time.

In 1830, Dumas participated in the Revolution that ousted Charles X and replaced him with Dumas's former employer, the Duke of Orléans, who ruled as Louis-Philippe, the Citizen King. Until the mid-1830s, life in France remained unsettled, with sporadic riots by disgruntled Republicans and impoverished urban workers seeking change. As life slowly returned to normal, the nation began to industrialize. An improving economy combined with the end of press censorship made the times rewarding for Alexandre Dumas's literary skills.

During the French Revolution of 1848, Dumas unsuccessfully sought election to the Constituent Assembly, campaigning in Paris and Seine-et-Oise. His political platform included republican reforms, the abolition of hereditary privileges, and opposition to compulsory military conscription. Later that year, he also stood unsuccessfully for election in the Yonne department.

After writing additional successful plays, Dumas switched to writing novels. Although attracted to an extravagant lifestyle and always spending more than he earned, Dumas proved to be an astute marketing strategist and writer. As newspapers were publishing many serial novels, he began producing these. His first serial novel was La Comtesse de Salisbury; Édouard III (July–September 1836). In 1838, Dumas rewrote one of his plays as a successful serial historical novel, Le Capitaine Paul ('Captain Paul'), partly based on the life of the Scottish-American naval officer John Paul Jones.

He founded a production studio, staffed with writers who turned out hundreds of stories, all subject to his personal direction, editing, and additions. From 1839 to 1841, Dumas, with the assistance of several friends, compiled Celebrated Crimes, an eight-volume collection of essays on famous criminals and crimes from European history. He featured Beatrice Cenci, Martin Guerre, Cesare and Lucrezia Borgia, as well as more recent events and criminals, including the cases of the alleged murderers Karl Ludwig Sand and Antoine François Desrues, who were executed. Dumas collaborated with Augustin Grisier, his fencing master, in his 1840 novel, The Fencing Master. The story is written as Grisier's account of how he came to witness the events of the Decembrist revolt in Russia. The novel was eventually banned in Russia by Czar Nicholas I, and Dumas was prohibited from visiting the country until after the Czar's death. Dumas refers to Grisier with great respect in The Count of Monte Cristo, The Corsican Brothers, and in his memoirs.

Dumas depended on numerous assistants and collaborators, of whom Auguste Maquet was the best known. It was not until the late twentieth century that his role was fully understood. Dumas wrote the short novel Georges (1843), which uses ideas and plots later repeated in The Count of Monte Cristo. Maquet took Dumas to court to get authorial recognition and a higher payment rate for his work. He was successful in getting more money, but not a by-line.

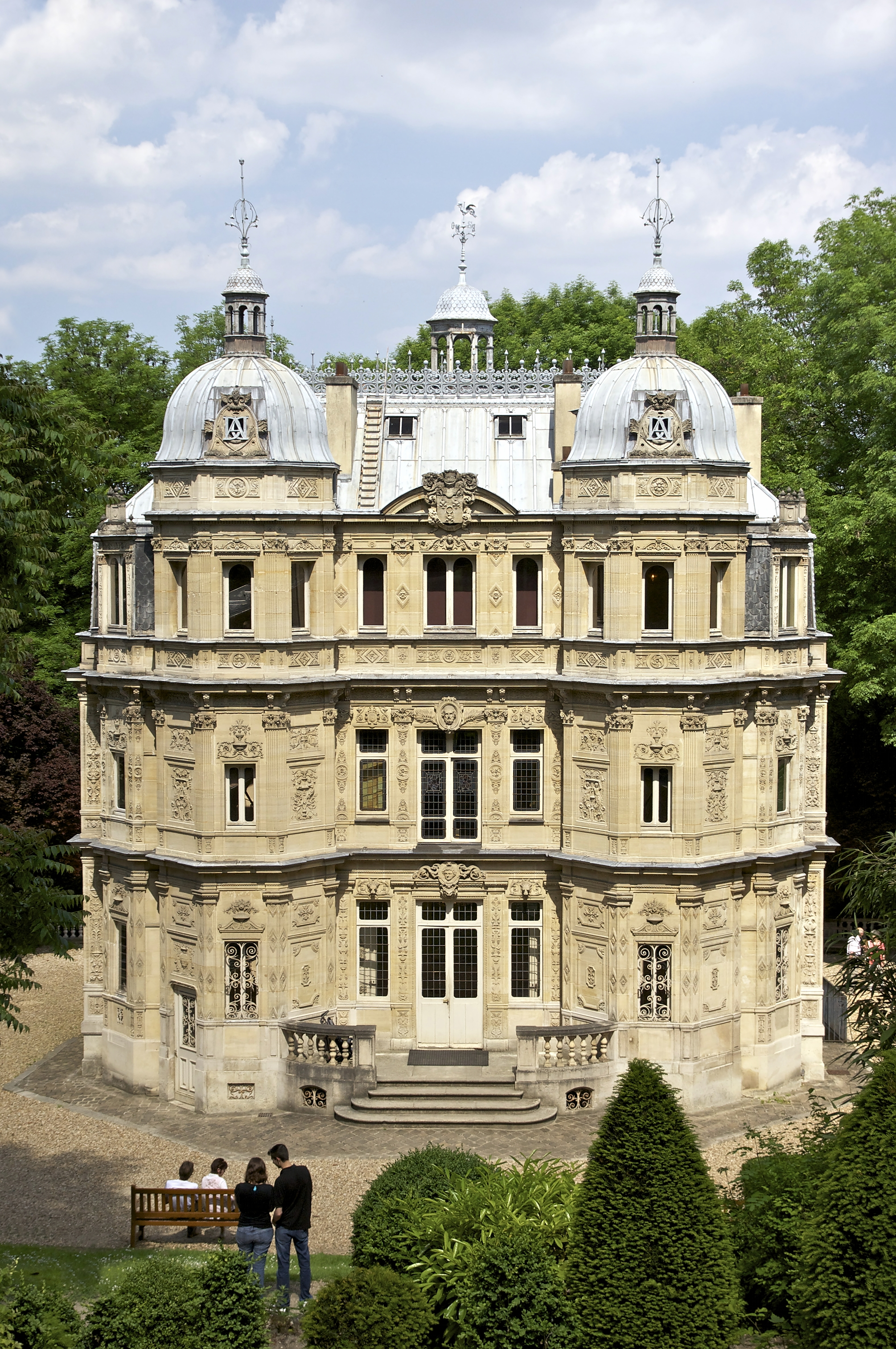
The Château de Monte-Cristo in Le Port-Marly

Dumas's novels were so popular that they were soon translated into English and other languages. His writing earned him a great deal of money, but he was frequently insolvent, as he spent lavishly on women and sumptuous living. (Scholars have found that he had a total of 40 mistresses.) In 1846, he had built a country house outside Paris at Le Port-Marly, the large Château de Monte-Cristo, with an additional building for his writing studio. It often was filled with strangers and acquaintances who stayed for lengthy visits and took advantage of his generosity. Two years later, faced with financial difficulties, he sold the entire property.

Dumas wrote in a wide variety of genres and published a total of 100,000 pages in his lifetime. He made use of his experience, writing travel books after taking journeys, including those motivated by reasons other than pleasure. Dumas travelled to Spain, Italy, Germany, England and French Algeria. After King Louis-Philippe was ousted in a revolt, Louis-Napoléon Bonaparte was elected president. As Bonaparte disapproved of the author, Dumas fled in 1851 to Brussels, Belgium, which was also an effort to escape his creditors. Dumas travelled to Russia in June 1858 at the invitation to a wedding by Count Grigory Kushelev-Bezborodko in St. Petersburg. He then visited Moscow, Tsaritsyne (Volgograd), Kazan, Astrakhan, Baku, Tbilisi and other towns and returned to Marseille, France by steamer from either Poti or Trebizonde in February 1859. He published at least two travel books about Russia.

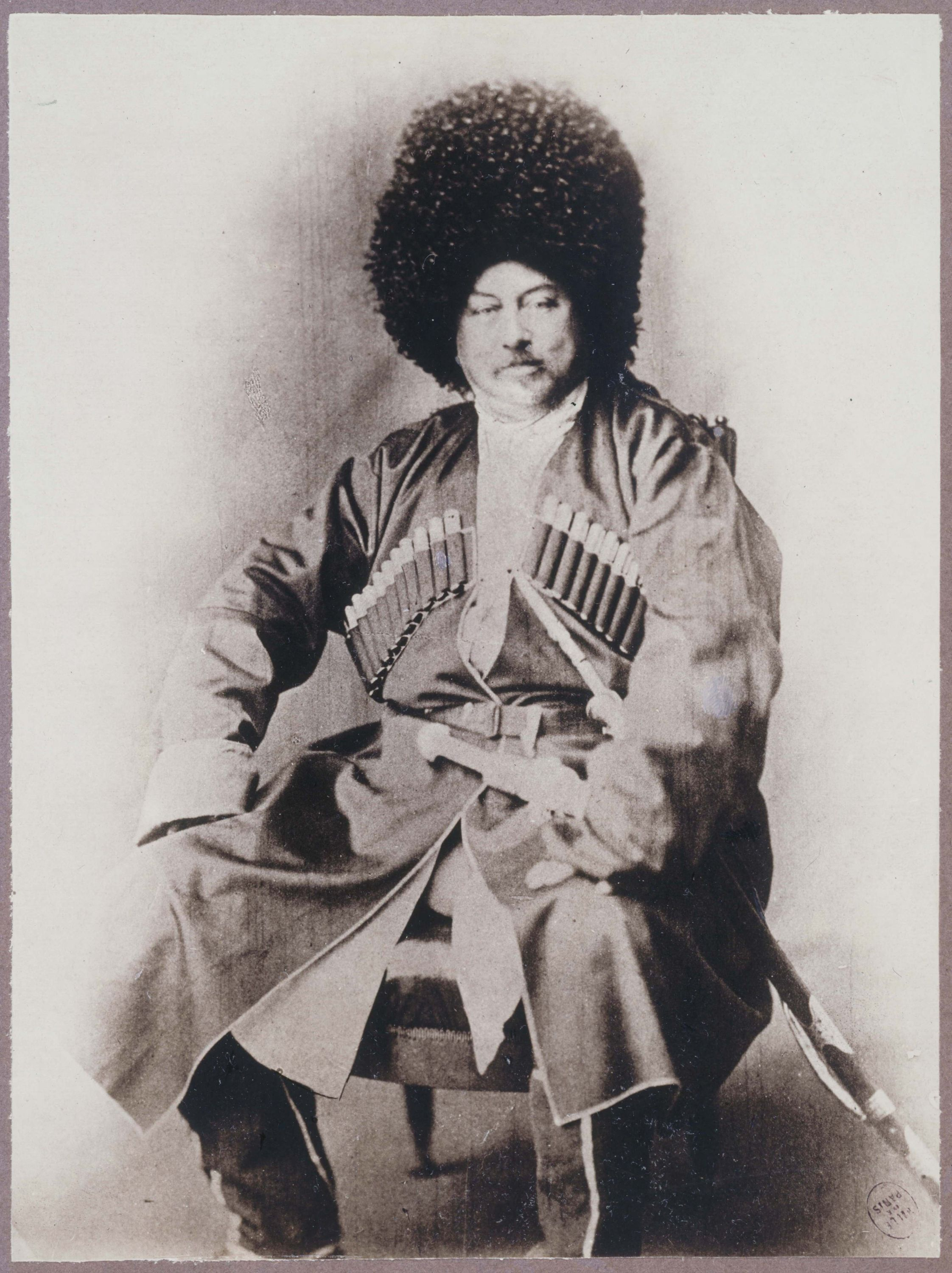
Alexandre Dumas in a chokha and papakha during a trip to the Caucasus

In March 1861, the kingdom of Italy was proclaimed, with Victor Emmanuel II as its king. Dumas travelled there and for the next three years participated in the movement for Italian unification. He founded and led a newspaper, Indipendente. While there, he befriended Giuseppe Garibaldi, whom he had long admired and with whom he shared a commitment to liberal republican principles as well as membership within Freemasonry. Returning to Paris in 1864, he published travel books about Italy.

Despite Dumas's aristocratic background and personal success, he had to deal with discrimination related to his mixed-race ancestry. In 1843, he wrote the short novel Georges, which addressed some of the issues of race and the effects of colonialism. His response to a man who insulted him about his partial African ancestry has become famous. Dumas said:

My father was a mulatto, my grandfather was a Negro, and my great-grandfather a monkey. You see, Sir, my family starts where yours ends.

His best-known works include The Three Musketeers and The Count of Monte Cristo.

== Personal life ==
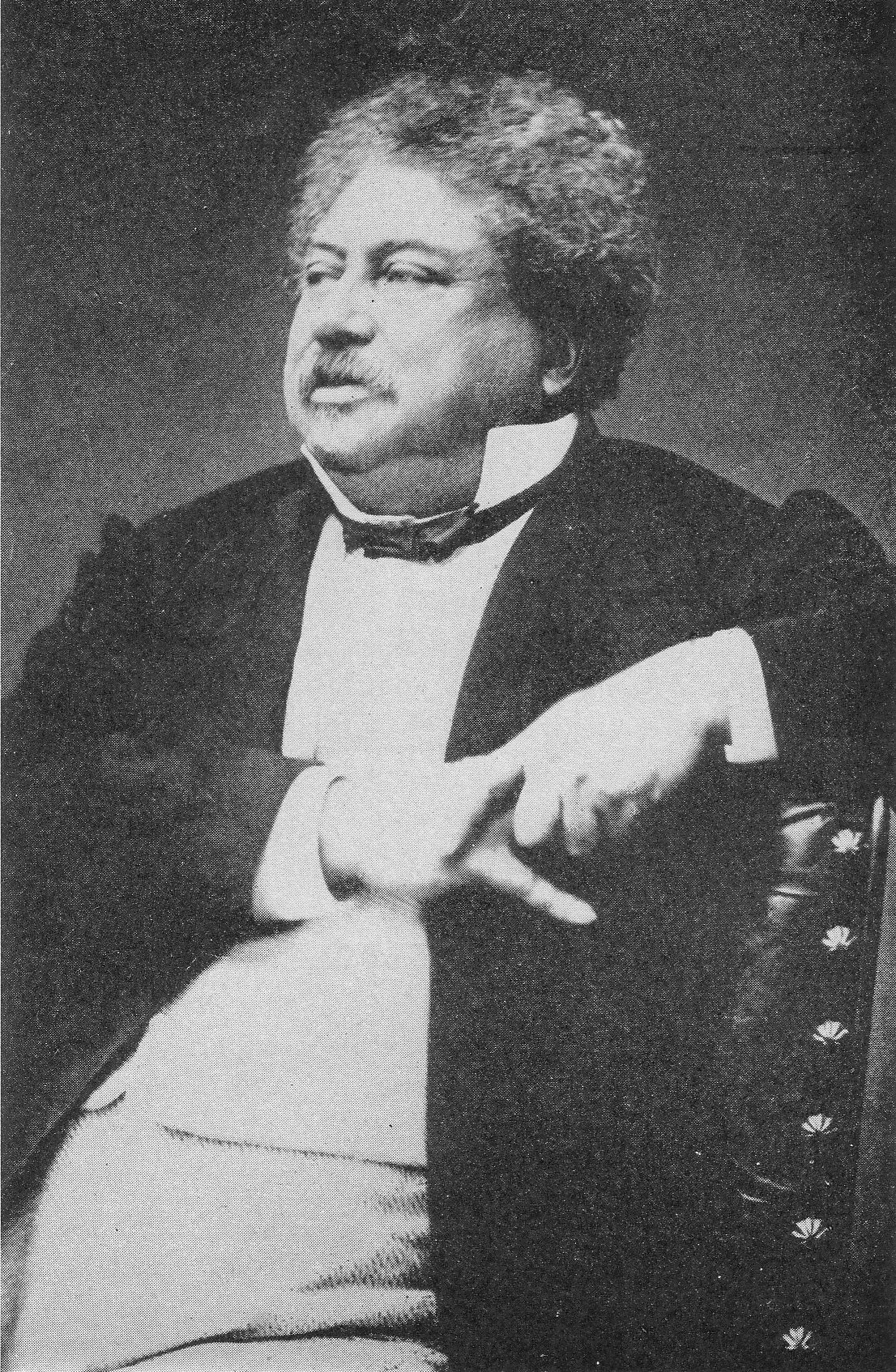
Dumas in the 1860s

On 1 February 1840, Dumas married actress Ida Ferrier (born Marguerite-Joséphine Ferrand) (1811–1859). They did not have any children together.

Dumas had numerous liaisons with other women; the scholar Claude Schopp lists nearly 40 mistresses. He is known to have fathered at least four children by them:

- Alexandre Dumas, fils (1824–1895), son of Marie-Laure-Catherine Labay (1794–1868), a dressmaker. He became a successful novelist and playwright.
- Marie-Alexandrine Dumas (1831–1878), daughter of Belle Kreilsamner (1803–1875) who acted under the stage name of Melanie Serre.
- Henry Bauër (1851–1915), son of Anna Bauër, a German of Jewish faith, wife of Karl-Anton Bauër, an Austrian commercial agent living in Paris
- Micaëlla-Clélie-Josepha-Élisabeth Cordier (born 1860), daughter of Émelie Cordier, an actress

About 1866, he had an affair with Adah Isaacs Menken, an American actress who was twenty-six years younger than Dumas and at the height of her career. She had performed her sensational role in Mazeppa in London. In Paris, she had a sold-out run of Les Pirates de la Savanne and was at the peak of her success.

He was a Freemason and remained so until the day he died. He was a member of the Lodge "La Cauderet" and of the Lodge "L'Olympique". Dumas often incorporated references to Freemasonry and the importance of brotherhood in his writing.

With Victor Hugo, Charles Baudelaire, Gérard de Nerval, Eugène Delacroix and Honoré de Balzac, Dumas was a member of the Club des Hashischins, which met monthly to take hashish at a hotel in Paris. Dumas's The Count of Monte Cristo contains several references to hashish.

== Death and legacy ==
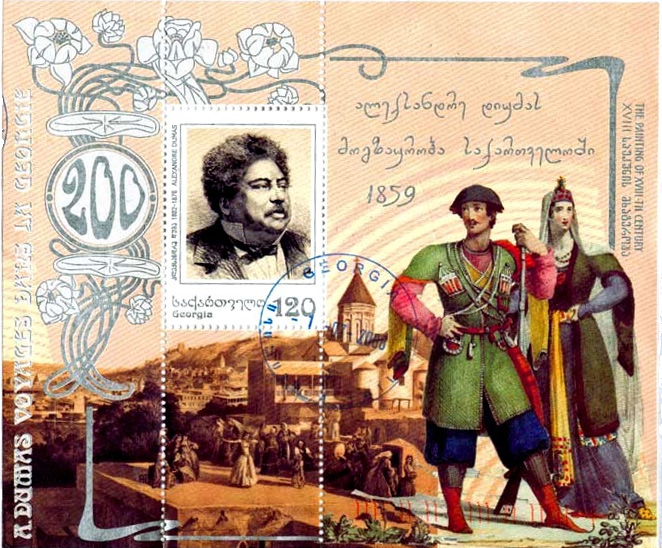
A postal stamp of Georgia dedicated to the 200th anniversary of Alexandre Dumas, who visited the Caucasus in 1858–1859

On 5 December 1870, Dumas died at the age of 68 of natural causes, possibly a heart attack. He was buried at his birthplace of Villers-Cotterêts in the department of Aisne. His death was overshadowed by the Franco-Prussian War. Changing literary fashions decreased his popularity. In the late 20th century, scholars such as Reginald Hamel and Claude Schopp caused a critical reappraisal and new appreciation of his art, as well as finding lost works.

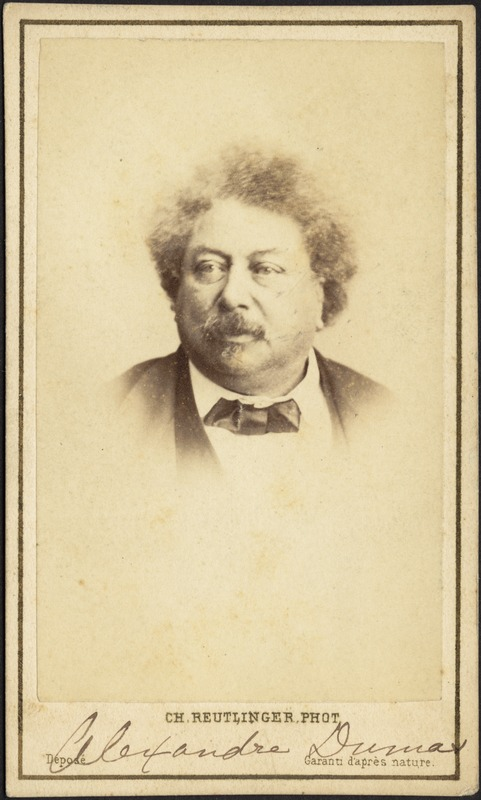
Alexandre Dumas, c. 1859–1870. Carte de Visite Collection, Boston Public Library.

In 1970, upon the centenary of his death, the Paris Metro named a station in his honour. His country home outside Paris, the Château de Monte-Cristo, has been restored and is open to the public as a museum.

Researchers have continued to find Dumas works in archives, including the five-act play The Gold Thieves, found in 2002 by the scholar Réginald Hamel in the Bibliothèque Nationale de France. It was published in France in 2004 by Honoré-Champion.

Frank Wild Reed (1874–1953), a New Zealand pharmacist who never visited France, amassed the greatest collection of books and manuscripts relating to Dumas outside France. The collection contains about 3,350 volumes, including some 2,000 sheets in Dumas's handwriting and dozens of French, Belgian and English first editions. The collection was donated to Auckland Libraries after his death. Reed wrote the most comprehensive bibliography of Dumas.

In 2002, for the bicentenary of Dumas's birth, French President Jacques Chirac held a ceremony honouring the author by having his ashes re-interred at the mausoleum of the Panthéon, where many French luminaries were buried. When Chirac ordered the transfer to the mausoleum, villagers in Dumas's hometown of Villers-Cotterets were initially opposed, arguing that Dumas laid out in his memoirs that he wanted to be buried there. The village eventually bowed to the government's decision, and Dumas's body was exhumed from its cemetery and put into a new coffin in preparation for the transfer. The proceedings were televised: the new coffin was draped in a blue velvet cloth and carried on a caisson flanked by four mounted Republican Guards costumed as the four Musketeers. It was transported through Paris to the Panthéon. In his speech, Chirac said:

With you, we were D'Artagnan, Monte Cristo, or Balsamo, riding along the roads of France, touring battlefields, visiting palaces and castles – with you, we dream.

Chirac acknowledged the racism that had existed in France and said that the re-interment in the Pantheon had been a way of correcting that wrong, as Alexandre Dumas was enshrined alongside fellow great authors Victor Hugo and Émile Zola. Chirac noted that although France has produced many great writers, none has been so widely read as Dumas. His novels have been translated into nearly 100 languages, and inspired more than 200 motion pictures.

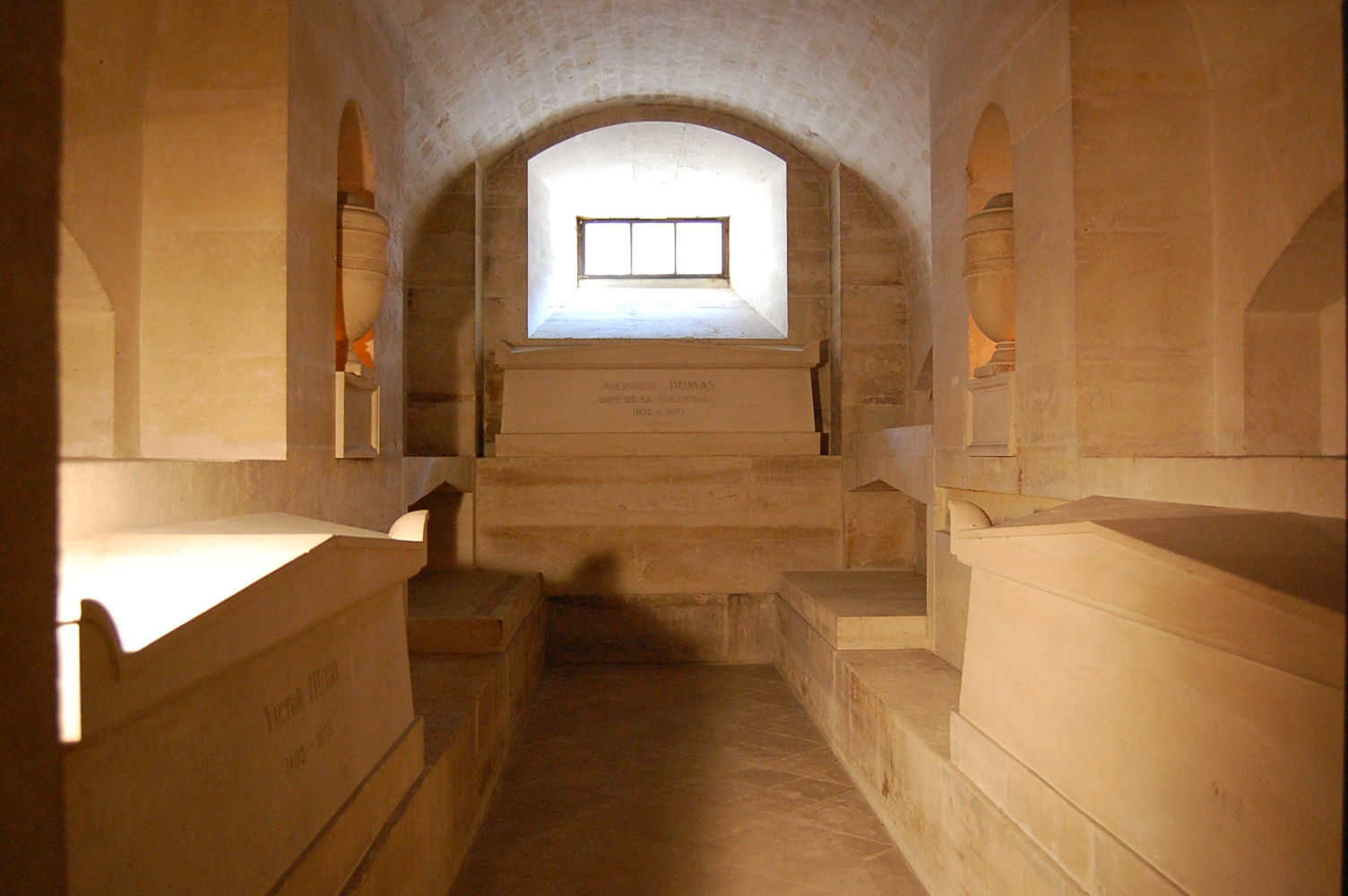
Tomb of Alexandre Dumas at the Panthéon in Paris

In June 2005, Dumas's last novel, The Knight of Sainte-Hermine, was published in France featuring the Battle of Trafalgar. Dumas described a fictional character killing Lord Nelson (Nelson was shot and killed by an unknown sniper). Writing and publishing the novel serially in 1869, Dumas had nearly finished it before his death. It was the third part of the Sainte-Hermine trilogy. Claude Schopp, a Dumas scholar, noticed a letter in an archive in 1990 that led him to discover the unfinished work. It took him years to research it, edit the completed portions, and decide how to treat the unfinished part. Schopp finally wrote the final two-and-a-half chapters, based on the author's notes, to complete the story. Published by Éditions Phébus, it sold 60,000 copies, making it a best seller. Translated into English, it was released in 2006 as The Last Cavalier, and has been translated into other languages. Schopp has since found additional material related to the Sainte-Hermine saga. Schopp combined them to publish the sequel Le Salut de l'Empire in 2008.

== Works ==
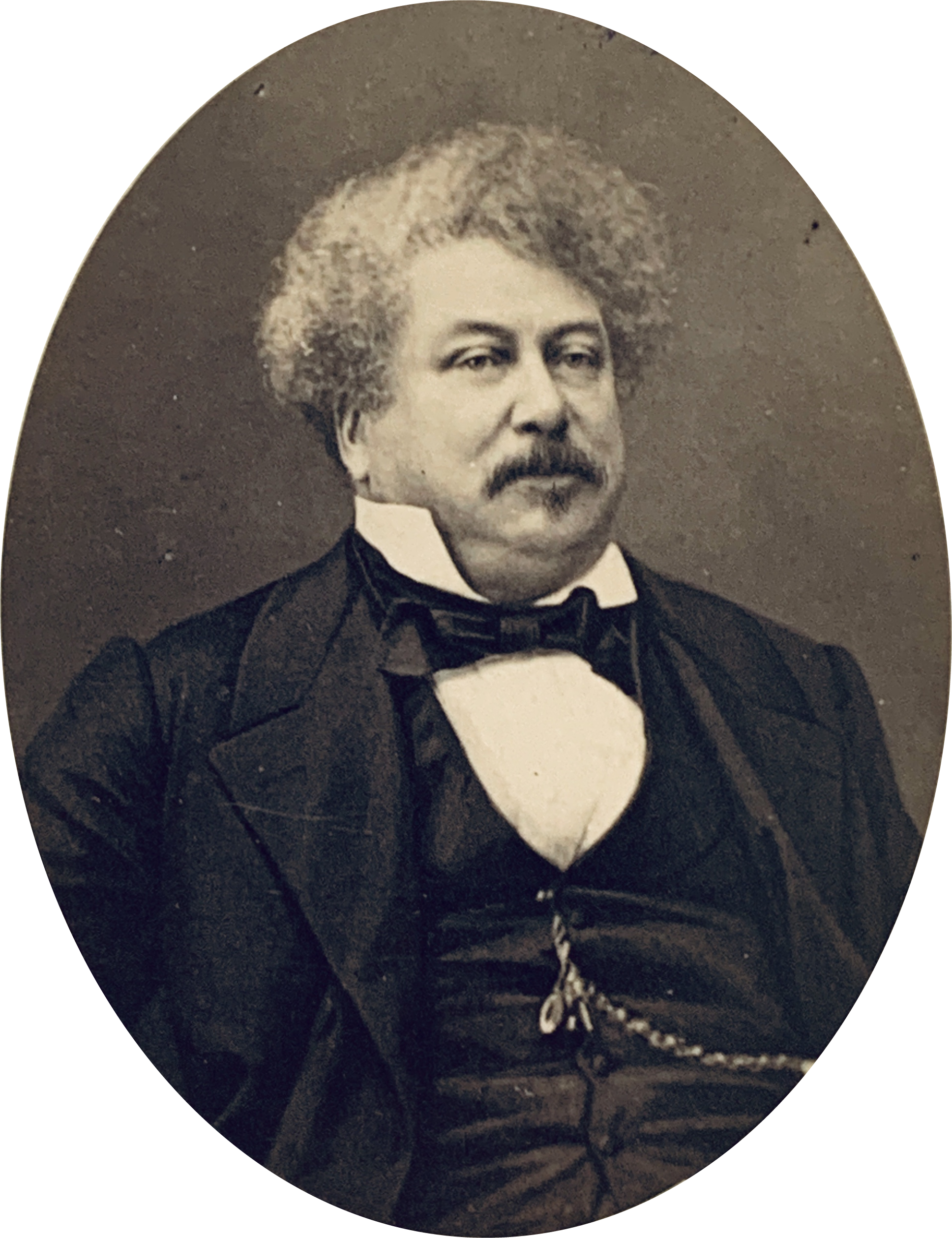
Dumas in 1860

=== Fiction ===
==== Christian history ====
- Acté of Corinth; or, The convert of St. Paul. a tale of Greece and Rome. (1839), a novel about Rome, Nero, and early Christianity.
- Isaac Laquedem (1852–53, incomplete)

==== Adventure ====
Alexandre Dumas wrote many stories and historical chronicles of adventure. They included the following:

- The Countess of Salisbury (La Comtesse de Salisbury; Édouard III, 1836), his first serial novel published in volume in 1839.
- Captain Paul (Le Capitaine Paul, 1838)
- Othon the Archer (Othon l'archer 1840)
- Captain Pamphile (Le Capitaine Pamphile, 1839)
- The Fencing Master (Le Maître d'armes, 1840)
- Castle Eppstein; The Spectre Mother (Chateau d'Eppstein; Albine, 1843)
- Georges (Planter of the Isle of France;, 1843)
- Amaury (1843)
- The Corsican Brothers (Les Frères Corses, 1844)
- The Black Tulip (La Tulipe noire, 1850)
- Olympe de Cleves (1851–52)
- Catherine Blum (1853–54)
- The Mohicans of Paris (Les Mohicans de Paris, 1854)
- Salvator (Salvator. Suite et fin des Mohicans de Paris, 1855–1859)
- The Last Vendee, or the She-Wolves of Machecoul (Les louves de Machecoul, 1859), a romance (not about werewolves).
- The Memoirs of Horace (1860)
- La Sanfelice (1864), set in Naples in 1800.
- Pietro Monaco, his wife Maria Oliverio and their accomplice (Pietro Monaco, sua moglie Maria Oliverio ed i loro complici, 1864), an appendix to Ciccilla by Peppino Curcio.
- The Prussian Terror (La Terreur Prussienne, 1867), set during the Seven Weeks' War.

==== Fantasy ====
- The Nutcracker (Histoire d'un casse-noisette, 1844): a revision of Hoffmann's story The Nutcracker and the Mouse King, later set by composer Pyotr Ilyich Tchaikovsky to music for a ballet also called The Nutcracker.
- The Pale Lady (La Dame Pȃle, 1849) A vampire tale about a Polish woman who is adored by two very different brothers.
- The Wolf Leader (Le Meneur de loups, 1857). One of the first werewolf novels ever written.

In addition, Dumas wrote many series of novels:

==== Monte Cristo ====
1. The Count of Monte Cristo (Le Comte de Monte-Cristo, 1844–46)

==== Louis XV ====
1. The Conspirators (Le chevalier d'Harmental, 1843) adapted by Paul Ferrier for an 1896 opéra comique by Messager.
2. The Regent's Daughter (Une Fille du régent, 1845). Sequel to The Conspirators.

==== The D'Artagnan Romances ====
The d'Artagnan Romances:

1. The Three Musketeers (Les Trois Mousquetaires, 1844)
2. Twenty Years After (Vingt ans après, 1845)
3. The Vicomte de Bragelonne, sometimes called Ten Years Later (Le Vicomte de Bragelonne, ou Dix ans plus tard, 1847). When published in English, it was usually split into three parts: The Vicomte de Bragelonne (sometimes called Between Two Kings), Louise de la Valliere, and The Man in the Iron Mask, of which the last part is the best known.

===== Related books =====
1. Louis XIV and His Century (Louis XIV et son siècle, 1844)
2. The Women's War (La Guerre des Femmes, 1845): follows Baron des Canolles, a naïve Gascon soldier who falls in love with two women.
3. The Dove – the court of Louis XIII, revolving around courtly intrigue, romantic loyalty, and a symbolic dove given as a token of love
4. The Count of Moret; The Red Sphinx; or, Richelieu and His Rivals (Le Comte de Moret; Le Sphinx Rouge, 1865–66) – a prequel to The Dove

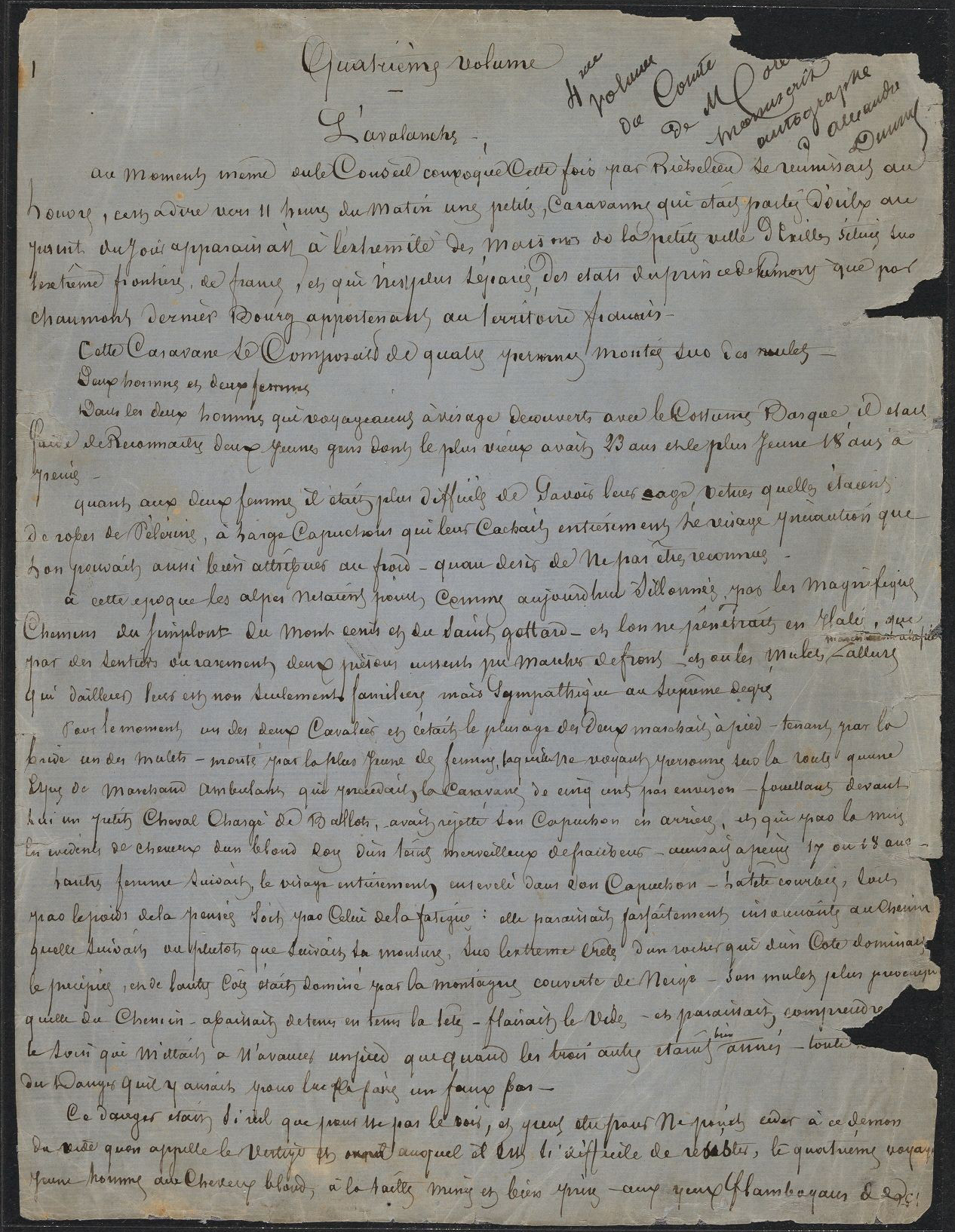
First page of the original manuscript to Le Comte de Moret

==== The Valois romances ====
The Valois were the royal house of France from 1328 to 1589, and many Dumas romances cover their reign. Traditionally, the so-called "Valois Romances" are the three that portray the Reign of Queen Marguerite, the last of the Valois. Dumas, however, later wrote four more novels that cover this family and portray similar characters, starting with François or Francis I, his son Henry II, and Marguerite and François II, children of Henry II and Catherine de' Medici.

1. La Reine Margot, also published as Marguerite de Valois (1845)
2. La Dame de Monsoreau (1846) Published in some English editions as "Chicot the Jester".
3. The Forty-Five Guardsmen (1847) (Les Quarante-cinq)
4. Ascanio (1843). Written in collaboration with Paul Meurice, it is a romance of Francis I (1515–1547), but the main character is Italian artist Benvenuto Cellini. The opera Ascanio was based on this novel.
5. The Two Dianas (Les Deux Diane, 1846), is a novel about Gabriel, comte de Montgomery, who mortally wounded King Henry II and was lover to his daughter Diana de Castro. Although published under Dumas's name, it was wholly or mostly written by Paul Meurice.
6. The Page of the Duke of Savoy, (1855) is a sequel to The Two Dianas (1846), and it covers the struggle for supremacy between the Guises and Catherine de Médicis, the Florentine mother of the last three Valois kings of France (and wife of Henry II). The main character in this novel is Emmanuel Philibert, Duke of Savoy.
7. The Horoscope: a romance of the reign of François II (1858), covers François II, who reigned for one year (1559–60) and died at the age of 16.

==== The Marie Antoinette romances ====
The Marie Antoinette romances comprise eight novels. The unabridged versions (normally 100 chapters or more) comprise only five books (numbers 1, 3, 4, 7 and 8); the short versions (50 chapters or fewer) number eight in total:

1. Joseph Balsamo (Mémoires d'un médecin: Joseph Balsamo, 1846–48) (a.k.a. Memoirs of a Physician, Cagliostro, Madame Dubarry, The Countess Dubarry, or The Elixir of Life). Joseph Balsamo is about 1,000 pages long, and is usually published in two volumes in English translations: Vol 1. Joseph Balsamo and Vol 2. Memoirs of a Physician. The long unabridged version includes the contents of book two, Andrée de Taverney; the short abridged versions usually are divided in Balsamo and Andrée de Taverney as completely different books.
2. Andrée de Taverney, or The Mesmerist's Victim
3. The Queen's Necklace (Le Collier de la Reine, (1849–1850)
4. Ange Pitou (1853) (a.k.a. Storming the Bastille or Six Years Later). From this book, there are long unabridged versions which include the contents of book five, but there are many short versions that treat "The Hero of the People" as a separated volume.
5. The Hero of the People
6. The Royal Life Guard or The Flight of the Royal Family.
7. The Countess de Charny (La Comtesse de Charny, 1853–1855). As with other books, there are long unabridged versions which include the contents of book six; but many short versions that leave contents in The Royal Life Guard as a separate volume.
8. Le Chevalier de Maison-Rouge (1845) (a.k.a. The Knight of the Red House, or The Knight of Maison-Rouge)

==== The Sainte-Hermine trilogy ====
1. The Companions of Jehu (Les Compagnons de Jehu, 1857)
2. The Whites and the Blues (Les Blancs et les Bleus, 1867)
3. The Knight of Sainte-Hermine (Le Chevalier de Sainte-Hermine, 1869). Dumas's last novel, unfinished at his death, was completed by scholar Claude Schopp and published in 2005. It was published in English in 2008 as The Last Cavalier.

==== Robin Hood ====
These were a translation of Pierce Egan the Younger's Robin Hood and Little John, originally published in England in 1838.

1. The Prince of Thieves (Le Prince des voleurs, 1872, posthumously). About Robin Hood (and the inspiration for the 1948 film The Prince of Thieves).
2. Robin Hood the Outlaw (Robin Hood le proscrit, 1873, posthumously). Sequel to Le Prince des voleurs

=== Drama ===
Although best known now as a novelist, Dumas first earned fame as a dramatist. His Henri III et sa cour (1829) was the first of the great Romantic historical dramas produced on the Paris stage, preceding Victor Hugo's more famous Hernani (1830). Produced at the Comédie-Française and starring the famous Mademoiselle Mars, Dumas's play was an enormous success and launched him on his career. It had 50 performances over the next year, extraordinary at the time. Dumas's works included:

- The Hunter and the Lover (1825)
- The Wedding and the Funeral (1826)
- Henry III and His Court (1829)
- Christine – Stockholm, Fontainebleau, and Rome (1830)
- Napoleon Bonaparte or Thirty Years of the History of France (1831)
- Antony (1831) – a drama with a contemporary Byronic hero—is considered the first non-historical Romantic drama. It starred Mars's great rival Marie Dorval.
- Charles VII at the Homes of His Great Vassals (Charles VII chez ses grands vassaux, 1831). This drama was adapted by the Russian composer César Cui for his opera The Saracen.
- Teresa (1831)
- La Tour de Nesle (1832), a historical melodrama
- The Memories of Anthony (1835)
- The Chronicles of France: Isabel of Bavaria (1835)
- Kean (1836), based on the life of the notable late English actor Edmund Kean. Frédérick Lemaître played him in the production.
- Caligula (1837)
- Miss Belle-Isle (1837)
- The Young Ladies of Saint-Cyr (1843)
- The Youth of Louis XIV (1854)
- The Son of the Night – The Pirate (1856) (with Gérard de Nerval, Bernard Lopez, and Victor Sejour)
- The Gold Thieves (after 1857): an unpublished five-act play. It was discovered in 2002 by the Canadian scholar Reginald Hamel, who was researching in the Bibliothèque Nationale de France. The play was published in France in 2004 by Honoré-Champion. Hamel said that Dumas was inspired by a novel written in 1857 by his mistress Célèste de Mogador.

Dumas wrote many plays and adapted several of his novels as dramas. In the 1840s, he founded the Théâtre Historique, located on the Boulevard du Temple in Paris. The building was used after 1852 by the Opéra National (established by Adolphe Adam in 1847). It was renamed the Théâtre Lyrique in 1851.

=== Opera ===
Dumas wrote four original libretti for the Parisian opera stage:

- Piquillo (1837), opéra-comique in one act with music by Hippolyte Monpou (1804–1841)
- Samson (1856), tableaux bibliques in four acts with music by Gilbert Duprez (1806–1896), with Édouard Duprez (1804–1879)
- La Bacchante (1858), opéra-comique in 2 acts with music by Eugène Gautier (1822–1878), with Adolphe de Leuven (1802–1884)
- Le roman d'Elvire (1860), opéra-comique in 3 acts with music by Ambroise Thomas (1811–1896), with Adolphe de Leuven

=== Non-fiction ===
Dumas was a prolific writer of nonfiction. He wrote journal articles on politics and culture and books on French history.

His lengthy Grand Dictionnaire de cuisine (Great Dictionary of Cuisine) was published posthumously in 1873, and several editions of it are still in print today. A combination of encyclopaedia and cookbook, it reflects Dumas's interests as both a gourmet and an expert cook. An abridged version (the Petit Dictionnaire de cuisine, or Small Dictionary of Cuisine) was published in 1883.

He was also known for his travel writing. These books included:

- Impressions de voyage: En Suisse (Travel Impressions: In Switzerland, 1834)
- Une Année à Florence (A Year in Florence, 1841)
- De Paris à Cadix (From Paris to Cadiz, 1846)
- Le Véloce: Tangier à Tunis (Tangier to Tunis, 1846–47), 1848–1851
- Montevideo, ou une nouvelle Troie, 1850 (The New Troy), inspired by the Great Siege of Montevideo
- Le Journal de Madame Giovanni (The Journal of Madame Giovanni, 1856)
- Travel Impressions in the Kingdom of Napoli/Naples Trilogy:
  - Impressions of Travel in Sicily (Le Speronare (Sicily – 1835), 1842
  - Captain Arena (Le Capitaine Arena (Italy – Aeolian Islands and Calabria – 1835), 1842
  - Impressions of Travel in Naples (Le Corricolo (Rome – Naples – 1833), 1843
- Travel Impressions in Russia – Le Caucase Original edition: Paris 1859
- Adventures in Czarist Russia, or From Paris to Astrakhan (Impressions de voyage: En Russie; De Paris à Astrakan: Nouvelles impressions de voyage (1858), 1859–1862
- Voyage to the Caucasus (Le Caucase: Impressions de voyage; suite de En Russie (1859), 1858–1859
- The Bourbons of Naples (Italian: I Borboni di Napoli, 1862) (7 volumes published by Italian newspaper L'Indipendente, whose director was Dumas himself).

== Dumas Society ==
French historian Alain Decaux founded the "Société des Amis d'Alexandre Dumas" (The Society of Friends of Alexandre Dumas) in 1971. As of August 2017 its president is Claude Schopp. The purpose in creating this society was to preserve the Château de Monte-Cristo, where the society is currently located. The other objectives of the Society are to bring together fans of Dumas, to develop cultural activities of the Château de Monte-Cristo, and to collect books, manuscripts, autographs and other materials on Dumas.

== Honours and awards ==
- Chevalier of the Order of Legion of Honour

== See also ==
- Alexandre Dumas Museum
- Black Europeans of African ancestry
- Illegitimacy in fiction
- Popular novel in France
- Dumas (film) (2010)

== Sources ==
- Bell, A. Craig (1950). Alexandre Dumas: A Biography and Study. London: Cassell & Co.
- Gorman, Herbert (1929). The Incredible Marquis, Alexandre Dumas. New York: Farrar & Rinehart. OCLC 1370481.
- Hemmings, F.W.J. (1979). Alexandre Dumas, the King of Romance. New York: Charles Scribner's Sons. ISBN 0-684-16391-8.
- Lucas-Dubreton, Jean (1928). The Fourth Musketeer. trans. by Maida Castelhun Darnton. New York: Coward-McCann. OCLC 230139.
- Maurois, André (1957). The Titans, a Three-Generation Biography of the Dumas. trans. by Gerard Hopkins. New York: Harper & Brothers Publishers. OCLC 260126.
- Phillips, Emma Watts (1891). Watts Phillips: Artist and Playwright. London: Cassell & Company.
- Reed, F. W. (Frank Wild) (1933). A Bibliography of Alexandre Dumas, père. Pinner Hill, Middlesex: J.A. Neuhuys. OCLC 1420223.
- Ross, Michael (1981). Alexandre Dumas. Newton Abbot, London, North Pomfret (Vt): David & Charles. ISBN 0-7153-7758-2.
- Schopp, Claude (1988). Alexandre Dumas, Genius of Life. trans. by A. J. Koch. New York, Toronto: Franklin Watts. ISBN 0-531-15093-3.
- Spurr, Harry A. (October 1902). The Life and Writings of Alexandre Dumas. New York: Frederick A. Stokes, Company. OCLC 2999945.
