= Swear It Was a Dream =

Studio album by Joe Firstman
- Released: September 6, 2011
- Genre: Contemporary Folk
- Length: 27:43
- Label: 1stMan Music
- Producer: Joe Firstman and Mike Vizcarra

Joe Firstman chronology
Live at the Treehouse (2010)	Swear It Was a Dream (2011)	Cordovas (2011)

Swear It Was a Dream was released by Joe Firstman on his own 1stMan Music label in 2011. CD copies were available at shows, and digital copies of the album are available through the iTunes Store, Amazon Music, and Bandcamp.

== Track listing ==
1. "Take the Rain" – 3:30
2. "Angel Moon" – 3:37
3. "Carolina" – 2:44
4. "Who's Turning Your Light Out?" – 2:05
5. "Standin' on the Porch" – 3:32
6. "Birthday Party" – 2:30
7. "Wild Fire" – 2:12
8. "Born Dreamer" – 2:50
9. "Falling White Flowers" – 2:26
10. "Gone" – 2:17
