= Antoine François Desrues =

Antoine-François Desrues (1744-1777)

Antoine François Desrues (1744–1777) was a French poisoner.

Desrues was born at Chartres, of humble parents. He went to Paris to seek his fortune, and started in business as a grocer. He was known as a man of great piety and devotion, and his business was reputed to be a flourishing one, but when, in 1773, he gave up his shop, his finances, owing to personal extravagance, were in a deplorable condition.

Nevertheless, Desrues entered into negotiations with a Madame de la Motte for the purchase from her of a country estate, and, when the time came for the payment of the purchase money, invited her to stay with him in Paris pending the transfer. While she was still his guest, he poisoned first her and then her son, a youth of sixteen. Then, having forged a receipt for the purchase money and taken on the aristocratic name "Desrues de Bury," he endeavoured to obtain possession of the property.

But by this time the disappearance of Madame de la Motte and her son had aroused suspicion. Desrues was arrested, the bodies of his victims were discovered, and the crime was brought home to him. He was originally sentenced to life in prison, but was retried and condemned to be torn asunder alive and burned. He was condemned to death and executed in Paris in 1777, Desrues repeating protestations of his innocence to the last. An extended debate ensued after his death, which was seen as a touchstone for understanding both the last years of the Ancien Régime and the early revolutionary period, with Balzac, Hugo, and Dumas among the participants. As late as 1828 a dramatic version of it was performed in Paris.
