= Édouard Montaubry =

French opera singer

- Born: Jean-Baptiste-Édouard Montaubry; 27 March 1824; Niort
- Died: 12 February 1883 (aged 58); Milan
- Occupations: Composer, violinist, conductor

Jean Baptiste Édouard Montaubry (27 March 1824 – 12 February 1883) was a French violinist, conductor, tenor and composer.

He was the brother of the tenor Achille-Félix Montaubry (1826-1898).

== Bibliography ==
- Erik Kocevar: "Jean-Baptiste-Édouard Montaubry", in Joël-Marie Fauquet (ed.): Dictionnaire de la musique en France au XIXe siècle (Paris: Fayard, 2003); ISBN 2-213-59316-7.
