= The Fencing Master (Dumas novel) =

1840–1842 novel by Alexandre Dumas

The Fencing Master (French: Le Maître d'armes) is a novel by Alexandre Dumas published in 1840–1842. The novel is set in Russia, and includes many details of the Russian Decembrist revolt that took place in 1825, as well as many behind-the-scenes stories of the Royal Court life that the government preferred to keep hidden.

The book was written based on the notes of Dumas' fencing teacher, Augustin Grisier. Grisier (1791-1865), already famous for his fencing skills, arrived to Russia in 1819, and spent 10 years in St. Petersburg and Moscow. Besides teaching fencing to some of the local elite, he also held some positions with the Russian government. The novel includes Grisier's account of how he came to witness the events of the Decembrist revolt in Russia.

Another source for the novel was Jacques-François Ancelot’s book Six mois en Russie (1827, 1838). Dumas borrowed much material from Ancelot's descriptions of Russian scenery, social customs, Court life, and the layout of the capital.

The novel tells the story of a well-born young French woman Pauline who travels to Russia and meets one of the Decembrists, an officer Ivan Annenkov, who figures in the novel under the name Waninkoff. She fell in love, and after the rebellion was suppressed, travelled to Siberia where her loved one was exiled for many years, eventually marrying him.

The novel was soon banned in Russia by Czar Nicholas I, and Dumas preferred not to visit the country until after the Czar's death. He did travel to Russia eventually in 1858, and there he met for the first time both Pauline and Annenkov.

Dumas refers to Grisier with great respect in The Count of Monte Cristo, The Corsican Brothers, and in his memoirs.

== English translations ==
The first English translation of the novel was published in 1853 in London by Longman Publishers under the title Memoirs of a Maître d'Armes; or, Eighteen Months at St. Petersburg. It was translated by John Butler, 2nd Marquess of Ormonde.

In 1904, another translation, by Alfred Richard Allinson, was published by Methuen in London. This became the most common English translation, and was often reprinted.

In 2025, a more recent translation by Serge Laclos was released.
