= The Knight of Sainte-Hermine =

Unfinished novel by Alexandre Dumas

- Author: Alexandre Dumas
- Language: French
- Genre: Historical novel, swashbuckler
- Publication date: 2005
- Publication place: France
- Pages: 900

The Knight of Sainte-Hermine (published in France in 2005 under the title Le Chevalier de Sainte-Hermine, and translated to English under the title The Last Cavalier) is an unfinished historical novel by Alexandre Dumas, believed to be Dumas' last major work. The novel was lost until the late twentieth century. Dumas scholar Claude Schopp found an almost-complete copy in the form of a newspaper serial. A number of Dumas' previously forgotten works have been found, but this novel is the largest and most complete at 900 pages.

The novel is a swashbuckling tale set during the rise of the Napoleonic Empire. A key scene features the Battle of Trafalgar and the death of British admiral Horatio Nelson. It was translated into English and published in 2007 as The Last Cavalier, and has since been translated into other languages.

== History ==
"You can imagine my surprise when, among reels and reels of microfilmed archives, I stumbled upon an almost complete serialised novel, entitled The Knight of Sainte-Hermine, and signed by Alexandre Dumas". —Claude Schopp (Bell, 2005)

The novel The Knight of Sainte-Hermine concludes the Sainte-Hermine trilogy, a story started in the 1857 novel The Companions of Jehu (Les Compagnons de Jehu), and continued in the 1867 The Whites and the Blues (Les Blancs et Les Bleus). It was originally serialised from January 1 to November 1869 in the French newspaper Le Moniteur Universel. The rush to publish in a serialised form resulted in the novel's being published with errors, but the newspaper carried almost the entire work. Only a short section was missing at the end, presumably unfinished because of Dumas' final illness. The author died in December 1870.

The novel was lost until 1990, when the Dumas expert Claude Schopp discovered references to its material and finally the newspaper serial in the archives of the Bibliothèque Nationale. Schopp's articles on Dumas' work have been part of a critical reappraisal of the writer, contributing to the government's honoring the author in 2002 by a reinterment ceremony at the Panthéon de Paris.

Schopp kept the find a secret until 2005. He confided only in Jean-Pierre Sicre, his editor, and Christophe Mercier, a literary critic. Schopp received other contributing material from archives in the Kynžvart Castle in former Czechoslovakia after the fall of the Iron Curtain. Over the next 10 years, Schopp converted the serialised material to novel form, corrected the many errors, including confused names and places; did other editing, and, after debating it, wrote three chapters based on Dumas's notes to complete the novel. This new material was printed in italics to distinguish it from Dumas's work.

The novel was released on June 3, 2005, by Editions aklas. The novel, issued with a run of 2,000 copies, immediately became a bestseller in France, quickly selling 60,000 copies. In 2007 Pegasus Books in New York published an English translation entitled The Last Cavalier.

Le Salut de l'Empire, a sequel written by Schopp incorporating additional Dumas materials, was published in French in 2008.

Similarly, in 2002 Reginald Hamel, a Canadian scholar, found Dumas' unpublished five-act play The Gold Thieves in the Bibliothèque Nationale. It was published in 2004 in France by Honoré-Champion.

== Plot ==
"It's vintage Dumas, in the same vein as the vengeful hero of The Count of Monte-Cristo." —Claude Schopp (Bell, 2005)

The swashbuckling historical novel takes place after the events of the French Revolution and during the subsequent rise of the Napoleonic Empire. The protagonist is a French aristocrat who is torn between the old and new ways, and seeks vengeance for two brothers killed during the course of the preceding novels. Dumas depicts his protagonist killing British Vice-admiral Horatio Nelson during the Battle of Trafalgar against the French and Spanish navies. Historically, Nelson was killed by indiscriminate French gunfire. Another historical character to appear in the story is Fra Diavolo.
