= The War of Women (album) =

Studio album by Joe Firstman
- Released: August 12, 2003
- Studios: Sandbox Studio, Los Angeles
- Genre: Rock
- Length: 44:00
- Label: Atlantic
- Producers: Joe Firstman, Rick Parker

Joe Firstman chronology
The War of Women (2003)	Live at the Sandbox (2006)

Professional ratings
Review scores
Source	Rating
AllMusic	4/5 stars
The Music Box	2.5/5 stars

The War of Women is the first full-length album by American singer-songwriter Joe Firstman on Atlantic Records. It was composed and designed by Firstman. The album was co-produced by Firstman and Rick Parker, and released on August 12, 2003.

== Reception ==
The War of Women received mixed but mostly positive reviews. AllMusic, The Music Box, and Paste likened its sound to Counting Crows, Ryan Adams, and Elton John.

== Track listing ==
1. "Introduction to the War of Women" – 1:25
2. "Breaking All the Ground" – 4:25
3. "Can't Stop Loving You" – 3:56
4. "Now You're Gorgeous, Now You're Gone" – 4:02
5. "Car Door (Dancing in the Aisles)" – 3:32
6. "Saving All the Love" – 3:39
7. "Slave or Siren" – 3:30
8. "Chasing You Down" – 5:00
9. "The Adventures of the Empress of Harlem and the Amazing Subway Boy" – 3:48
10. "Lies" – 5:05
11. "Beautiful" – 4:15
12. "Secondhand Grave" – 5:26
13. "Speak Your Mind" – 4:29
14. "Savannah" – 3:07
15. "After Los Angeles" – 10:27

== Personnel ==
- Joe Firstman - Bass, Chamberlin, Choir/Chorus, Drums, Guitars, Mandolin, Piano, Vocals
- Chandra Watson - Vocals (Background)
- Chris Carangi - Bass, Choir/Chorus
- Eric Skodis - Choir/Chorus, Drums, Vocals (Background)
- Leigh Watson - Vocals (Background)
- Miranda Lee Richards - Guest Artist, Vocals (Background)
- Patrick Warren - Chamberlin, Guest Artist
- Rami Jaffee - Organ, Synthesizer
- Steve Gorman - Drums
- Tony Anaya - Bass
- Zane Musa - Saxophone

== Production ==
- Joe Firstman - Composer, Design, Direction, Producer
- Erik Reichers - Engineer
- Jack Joseph Puig - Mixing
- Kevin Williamson - A&R
- Louie Teran - Digital Editing
- Ria Lewerke - Design, Direction
- Rick Parker - Engineer, Producer
- Stephen Marcussen - Mastering
