= Henry III and His Court =

1829 play by Alexandre Dumas

- Written by: Alexandre Dumas
- Original language: French
- Genre: Historical drama

Premiere
- Date premiered: 10 February 1829
- Place premiered: Comédie-Française

Henry III and His Court (French: Henri III et sa cour) is a play written by Alexandre Dumas (père), based on the life of Henry III of France. It was the author's first produced play. Its premier performance at the Comédie-Française on 10 February 1829 was attended by the Duke of Orléans, the future king Louis Philippe I. The play was met with great acclaim and is considered an important work in the development of romanticism in French theatre.

A novelization in English was published as The King's Gallant; or, King Henry III and His Court in 1902.
