= Live at the Treehouse =

Studio album by Joe Firstman
- Released: August 17, 2010
- Genre: Contemporary Folk
- Length: 29:19
- Label: Rock Ridge Music
- Producers: Mike Vizcarra and Joe Firstman

Joe Firstman chronology
| El Porto (2010) | Live at the Treehouse (2010) | Swear It Was a Dream (2011) |

Professional ratings
Review scores
| Source | Rating |
|---|---|
| Allmusic | 3.5/5 stars |

Live at the Treehouse is a live-in-the-studio album recorded and released by Joe Firstman on Rock Ridge Music. The album includes rerecorded songs from previous albums, but it also contains a new song, "Middle Ground." According to Mark McDermott of the Easy Reader News, the new recordings show Firstman's "transformation" as an artist from the "full band ensembles of his early years to just his voice, guitar, and songs alone on the stage," additionally remarking that the songs are written by a younger Firstman but performed by a slightly older and wiser artist. To give the recordings a live feel, Firstman sings and plays at the same time, and the album has no overdubs. Live at the Treehouse contains a number of guest performers, as indicated in the track list below.

== Track listing ==
1. "The One That Makes You Happy" – 3:06
2. "Phoenix Hotel" – 2:25
3. "Fight Song" (featuring Brian Wright) – 2:33
4. "Pretty Things" (featuring Tim Jones and Walker Young) – 2:51
5. "Marlene and Her Sisters" (featuring Jamie Drake) – 2:23
6. "Everything Is a Crime" (featuring Mike Vizcarra) – 2:48
7. "Middle Ground" (featuring Jay Buchanan) – 3:04
8. "Mrs. Rosenthal" – 3:08
9. "Speak Your Mind" (iTunes Store exclusive)
10. "Crowded Town" (iTunes Store exclusive)
