= Achille-Félix Montaubry =

French opera singer

Achille-Félix Montaubry (12 November 1826 – 2 October 1898) was a French musician and operatic tenor, active in Paris; later a theatre director. His brother was the conductor and composer Édouard Montaubry (1824–1883).

== Life and career ==
Born in Niort, Deux-Sèvres, Montaubry at first studied cello at the Paris Conservatoire and began to play in orchestras, notably in the orchestra of the Théâtre du Vaudeville where his brother played first violin. Realising that he had an attractive voice, he returned to the Conservatoire as a student of Auguste Panseron and Marie Moreau-Sainti. After completing his studies he went to America and was engaged in New Orleans in both Italian and French opera. After two years he returned to Europe and found success as a light tenor in Lille, Brussels, the Hague, Strasbourg and Bordeaux.

In 1858 he was offered a five-year contract at the Opéra-Comique for 40,000 francs per year. Montaubry made his debut at the Salle Favart on 16 December 1858 in Les Trois Nicolas by Louis Clapisson, playing Nicolas Dalayrac. His success was great (he was praised by Berlioz) and lead to further important roles in the Opéra-Comique repertoire: Fra Diavolo, Le songe d'une nuit d'été, Les Mousquetaires de la reine, Zampa, Le Postillon de Lonjumeau, Le Petit chaperon rouge and Rose et Colas.

In 1860 he sang in an official cantata, Vive l'empereur with music by Jules Cohen. On 2 February 1861 he appeared as Alexis in La Circassienne by Daniel Auber, and in the same year a revival of Le Postillon de Lonjumeau (in the role of Chapelou).

In Le Joaillier de Saint-James (17 February 1862) he created the role of Bernard, and on 6 June 1863, in a brilliant revival of Zampa, Montaubry sang the title role, thus assisting a box-office success. He was also the first Bénédict in Berlioz's Béatrice et Bénédict, which premiered on 9 August 1862 in Baden-Baden. Eugène Gautier's Le Trésor de Pierrot (5 November 1864) saw Montaubry in the principal role (later going on to sing another Pierrot in Le Tableau parlant at the Théâtre de la Gaîté). In Le Voyage en Chine (1865) he created Henri de Kernoisan. He created several other roles at the theatre: in Le Roman d'Elvire, Lalla-Roukh and Lara.

In Le Fils du brigadier on 25 February 1867, there appeared evidence of wear in Montaubry's singing of Émile (a lieutenant), which continued in the title role of Robinson Crusoé. In 1868 Montaubry left the Opéra-Comique and bought a small theatre, the Folies-Marigny, which he directed and where Horace, an operetta he had composed, was mounted.

He left this theatre, "losing money but not finding his voice", after having another work performed, Son altesse le printemps, and on 12 June 1870 he appeared back at the Opéra-Comique in Le Postillon de Lonjumeau and Fra Diavolo. On 3 July 1871 he was seen as Juliano in Le Domino noir. Later the same year he took over the direction of the Théâtre des Arts in Rouen.

In 1872 he was taken on at the Gaîté for a revival of Orphée aux enfers by Offenbach. Later he sang Narcisse in the 1875 revision of Geneviève de Brabant at the Gaîté.

He married the singer Caroline Prévost in 1850 in the Hague. In 1877 he left Paris for theatre management outside the capital. He died in Angers.

His son sang Moralès in the premiere of Le Coeur et la main by Charles Lecocq at the Théâtre des Nouveautés in 1882.
