= Joe Firstman =

American musician (born 1979)

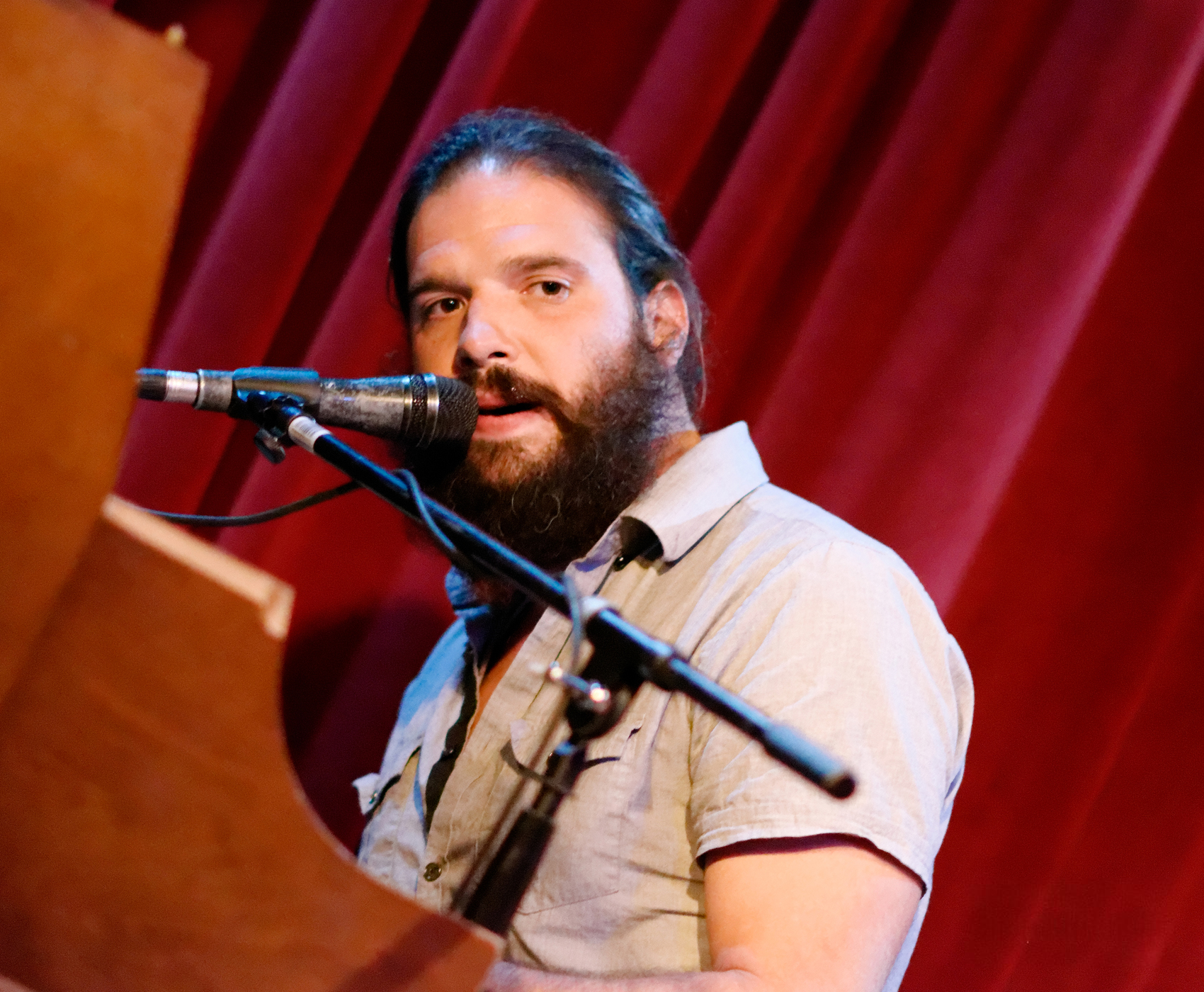

Background information
- Born: December 12, 1979 (age 45); Charlotte, North Carolina, United States
- Occupation(s): Singer, musician, songwriter, visual artist
- Instrument(s): Vocals, Piano, Guitar, Bass guitar
- Years active: 1990s–present
- Labels: Atlantic Records, 1stman Music, ATO Records
- Website: http://www.joefirstman.com/

Joe Firstman (born December 12, 1979) is an American multi-genre singer, songwriter, and late-night bandleader. He was the bandleader from 2005 to 2009 on American late night television program Last Call with Carson Daly broadcast on NBC. Firstman is now recording and touring with Cordovas, the band he founded in 2011.

== Early life ==
Born Joseph Mark Fuerstman (/fɜːrstmæn/ FURST-man) in Charlotte, North Carolina, the middle son of a professional opera singer mother and a championship chess player father, Joe Firstman began to teach himself piano at the age of 12 and quickly developed an insatiable love of music. He attended Northwest School of the Arts where he studied cello and visual arts.

Joe Firstman began to achieve musical notoriety with his eponymous band Firstman (formerly Isabel Sol) gaining success through the 1990s opening for national acts. In 2000, Firstman boarded a Greyhound bus relocating to Hollywood, California. Almost immediately Joe Firstman was named "Singer-Songwriter of the Year" at the 2001 Los Angeles Music Awards. He sold-out shows at venues such as The Troubador, Viper Room, and Whisky a Go Go, amassing the attention of music executives and industry insiders.

== Musical career ==
In 2002, Joe Firstman signed a major-label deal with Atlantic Records. He released a widely praised EP Wives Tales, and later that year, a full-length album, The War of Women, revealing the full scope of the then-23-year-old's prodigious talents. In support of this record, Firstman and his band toured nationally, opening for acts such as Jewel, Sheryl Crow, and Willie Nelson. Unheard of for a warm up act, his brief, eight-song set earned him a standing ovation in New York City's Radio City Music Hall. Joe Firstman received public praise and admiration for his "amazing bluesy voice," "walloping the audience with his energy" and for having the "audience hung on his every word." That band is notable for having helped launch the careers of My Morning Jacket guitarist Carl Broemel, Lady Antebellum guitarist Slim Gambill, and Rival Sons drummer Mike Miley.

In 2005, Joe Firstman left Atlantic Records to become the bandleader for NBC's late-night program, Last Call with Carson Daly. In November 2005, Joe Firstman became the official house band leader for Last Call. Notable members of his band include Kamasi Washington, Thundercat (musician), Kenny Aronoff, Mike Miley (Rival Sons), Brian Wright (musician), Zane Musa, Zane Carney, Mark Bryan, Marc Ford, and Ryan Porter. Firstman wrote the majority of the material the band performed. "His new gig didn't prevent him from continuing to write music, and in 2006 he released the EP Live at the Sandbox. He would continue to self-release records throughout his tenure on the show, releasing DrAMA! in 2007 and Fell Swoops in 2008. In 2009, NBC decided to go in another direction with Last Call", ending the in-studio format, freeing up Firstman to focus on songwriting. Firstman continued to self-release albums including the LP El Porto and the EP Live at the Treehouse, both in 2010, and Swear It Was a Dream in 2011.

In 2011, Joe Firstman formed the band Cordovas in Nashville, Tennessee, and released the self-titled full-length album Cordovas and a live album later that year. Cordovas played two sets at the 2012 Wakarusa Music and Art Festival in Ozark, AR. Cordovas are currently recording an album produced by Kenneth Pattengale of The Milk Carton Kids.

While consistently touring across North America, Joe Firstman continues "to draw on a rich tapestry of style and genre. It’s genre-blending to the point of genre-defying." In 2014, he released Love Bravely. Brooklyn, NY based The Deli Magazine says: "In addition to being a bottomless well of natural songwriting talent with years of touring experience with A-list acts, Firstman can claim four years acting as bandleader for The Carson Daly show. The role required a high level of day-to-day adaptability, which plays strongly into the polish and cohesion of Love Bravely, going on to call the record "magic" and "magnetic."

== Discography ==
=== Solo ===
- Wives Tales [EP] (2003, Atlantic Records)
- The War of Women (2003, Atlantic Records)
- Live at the Sandbox (2006, Beverly Martel Music)
- DrAMA! (2007, 1stman Music)
- Fell Swoops (2008, 1stman Music)
- El Porto (2010, Rock Ridge Music)
- Live at the Treehouse (2010, Rock Ridge Music)
- Swear It Was a Dream (2011, 1stman Music)
- Los Angeles 2002-2005, Vol. 1-11 [11 EPs] (2012, 1stman Music)
- Love Bravely (2014, 1stman Music)
- Prison Guards [EP] (2015, 1stman Music)

=== With Cordovas ===
- Cordovas (2011, 1stman Music)
- Cordovas Live From Nashville (2011, 1stman Music)
- That Santa Fe Channel (2018, ATO Records)
- Destiny Hotel (2020, ATO Records)
- The Rose of Aces (2023, ATO Records)
