= Louis Godefroy Jadin =

French painter (1805–1882)

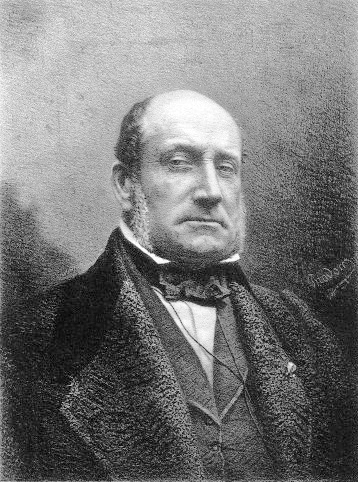
- Self-Portrait. Lithography published in L'Artiste in 1859.
- Born: 1805; France
- Died: 1882 (aged 76–77)
- Occupation: Painter

Louis Godefroy Jadin (30 June 1805, Paris – 1882, Paris) was a French painter specializing in animals and landscapes, especially known for having painted the hunts of Napoleon III and the dogs of the high society of the Second Empire. His father was the composer Louis-Emmanuel Jadin.

In painting and engraving, a student of Louis Hersent, of Abel de Pujol, of Paul Huet, of Richard Parkes Bonington and of Alexandre-Gabriel Decamps, he exhibited at the Salon for the first time in 1831. A close friend of Alexandre Dumas, Jadin accompanied Dumas on several voyages, in particular to Naples in 1835 and to Florence in 1840. Dumas introduced the painter to Ferdinand Philippe, Duke of Orléans, for whom Jadin decorated the dining room of the palace of Tuileries with hunting scenes.

Jadin won two medals of the third class, in 1834 and 1855, a medal of the second class in 1840, and a medal of the first class in 1848. He was made chevalier of the Légion d'honneur in 1854.
