= Georges (novel) =

1843 novel by Alexandre Dumas

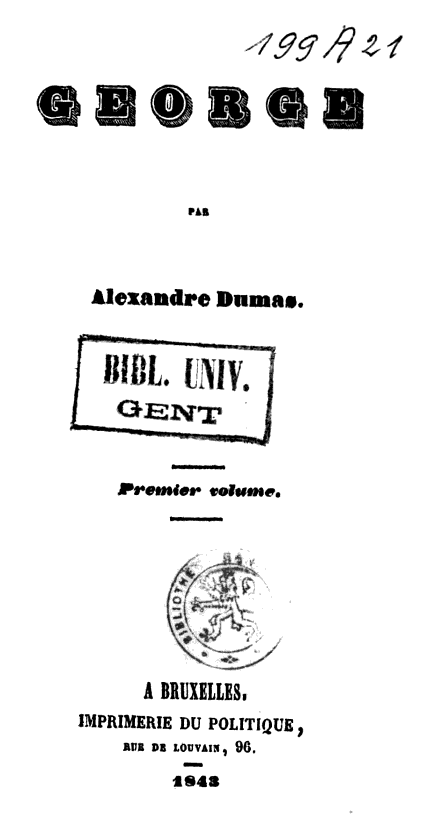
- Title page, Imprimerie Du Politique, 1843. (Note "George", without "s")
- Author: Alexandre Dumas, père
- Language: French
- Genre: Historical, adventure, romance
- Publication date: 1843
- Publication place: France
- Media type: Print (Hardback & Paperback)
- Pages: 336 pages (hardcover)

Georges is a novel by Alexandre Dumas, père set on Isle de France (Mauritius), from 1810 to 1824. This novel is of particular scholarly interest because Dumas reused many of its ideas and plot devices later in The Count of Monte Cristo and because race and racism are at the center of the novel, a topic Dumas rarely wrote about, despite his part-African ancestry. Georges was first published in 1843. It has been republished in English as George; or, the Planter of the Isle of France.

A new translation by Tina Kover, edited by Werner Sollors and with an introduction by Jamaica Kincaid, was published by Random House, Inc./Modern Library in May 2007.

== Plot ==
The novel concerns the life of Georges, the son of a wealthy mulatto planter named Pierre Munier, on the French colony of Mauritius. While also being a mulatto, Georges is very light-skinned to the point where he can pass for being white. As a child, he witnesses the British invasion of Isle de France. Because Pierre is a mulatto, the other planters on the island (who are all white) refuse to let him fight alongside them. Instead, Pierre leads a group of Black militiamen and successfully rout a British column, saving the lives of many of the planters. Refusing to acknowledge that a person of colour saved them, the other planters ignore Pierre's accomplishment.

Henri Malmédie, the son of a wealthy planter, begins to mock Georges for the treatment meted to his father, resulting in a fight breaking out between the two. Afterward, concerned about possible retaliation from Henri's father, Pierre sends Georges and his older brother Jacques to France to be educated. In France, the brothers are separated when the older brother gets a job on a merchant ship. Georges becomes cultured, deeply educated, and popular in Parisian high society. Through numerous tests of will, Georges overcomes his weaknesses and becomes skilled in a variety of fields, ranging from hunting to the art of seducing women.

Upon his return to Mauritius, he finds that the planters have forgotten who he is. In little time he becomes the toast of society, and a beautiful woman falls in love with him. He also discovers that his brother has become the captain of a slave ship. However, Georges cannot tolerate the injustice of slavery, so he conspires with the enslaved population on the colony to lead a slave revolt against the French planters. When this revolt fails, he is incarcerated and condemned to death. While Georges is being brought to be executed, Jacques and his men save him, Sara, who has married Georges, and Pierre. They then sail off, but are pursued by a Royal Navy ship (Britain still being at war with France). After a naval engagement, the British warship is sunk and they escape.

== Characters ==
- Georges: Georges is the protagonist of the novel. He is a light-skinned mulatto who is easily mistaken as white.
- Pierre Munier: The father of Georges. A wealthy mulatto plantation owner, and slave-owner.
- Jacques: The older brother of Georges. He becomes a slave-trader and a pirate captain.
- M. Malmédie: A jealous and racist man who despises Georges.
- Henri Malmédie: A spoiled and racist young man the same age as Georges.
- Sara: She is Henri Malmédie's cousin. M. Malmédie raises her to become Henri's wife. However, she falls in love with Georges, leading to conflict between the two men.
- Antonio Malai: A power-hungry slave, who uses cunning to achieve his means.
- Laiza: A noble African slave leader and a man of exemplary courage, loyalty, and honor.
- Miko-Miko: A Chinese merchant and friend to Georges.

== Adaptations ==
BBC Radio 4 dramatised Georges for radio, originally broadcast across February and March 2023.
