= Hippolyte Monpou =

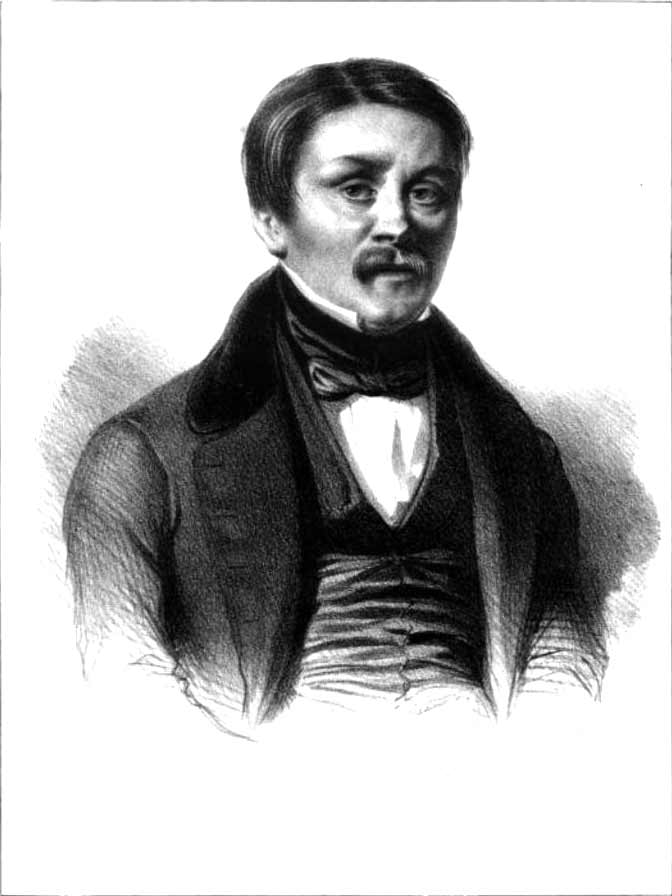

François Louis Hippolyte Monpou (12 January 1804 – 10 August 1841) was a French organist, and composer of songs and operas.

== Life ==
Monpou was born in Paris in 1804; aged five he became a chorister at Saint-Germain l'Auxerrois, and at nine was transferred to Notre Dame. In 1817 he entered as a pupil in the school founded by Alexandre-Étienne Choron, Institution royale de musique classique et religieuse, which he left in 1819 to be the organist at Tours Cathedral. He proved unfit for this post, and returned to Choron, who made him his assistant at his school. Here he had the opportunity of studying the works of ancient and modern composers of all schools, while taking lessons in harmony at the same time from Bernardo Porta, Hippolyte André Jean Baptiste Chélard and François-Joseph Fétis.

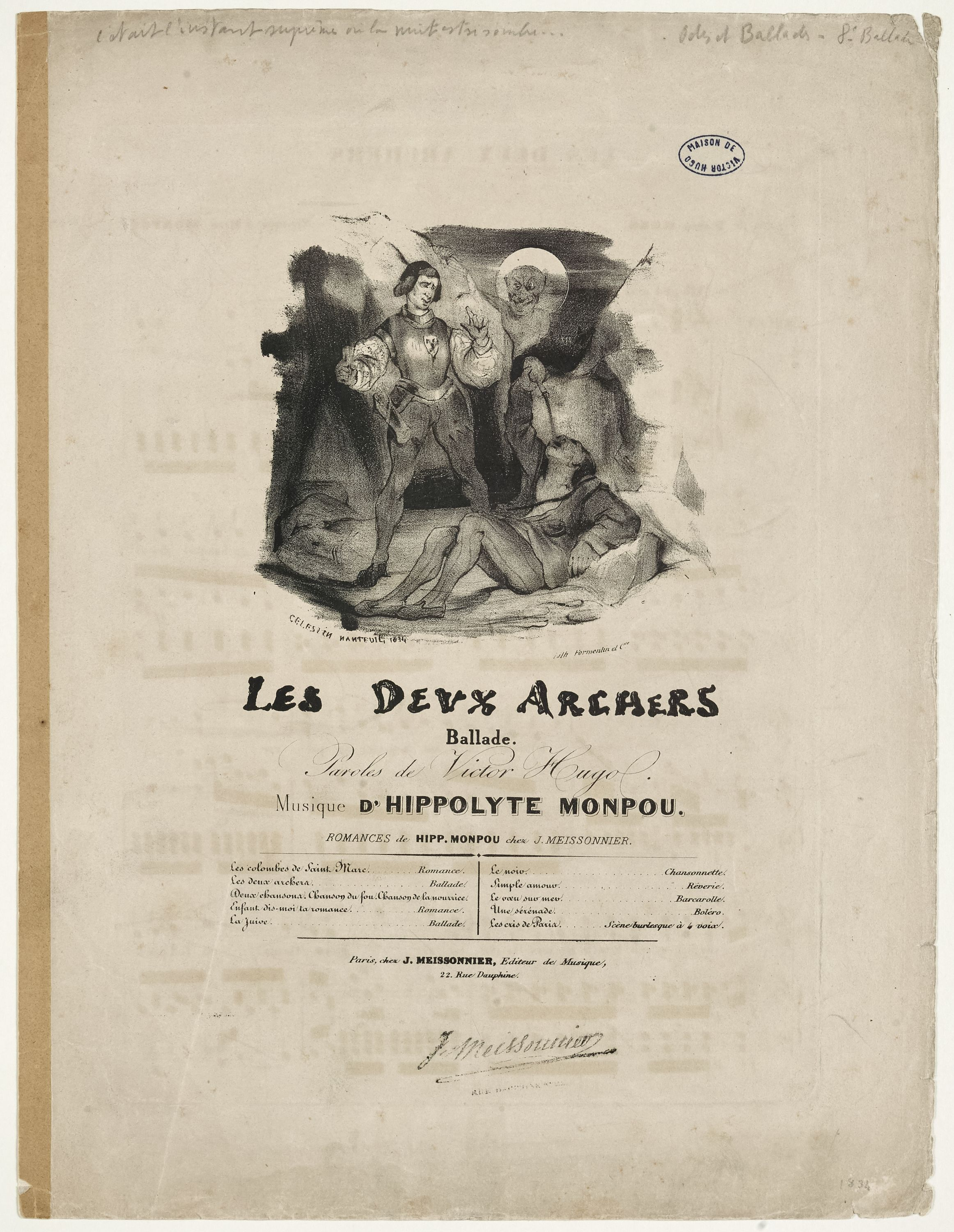
Title page of the ballad Les deux archers: words by Victor Hugo, music by Monpou

He was organist successively at Saint-Nicolas-des-Champs, Saint-Thomas-d'Aquin and the Sorbonne, and sacred music appeared to be his special vocation until 1828, when he published a piece for 3 voices to Pierre-Jean de Béranger's song, '"Si j'étais petit oiseau". He was now taken up by the poets of the romantic school, and published in rapid succession romances and ballads to words chiefly by Alfred de Musset and Victor Hugo. The composer was backed by influential friends, and these qualities were sufficient to attract public attention, and ensure success. But though he was the oracle of the romanticists, Monpou found himself after the close of Choron's school without regular employment, and being a married man found it necessary to have some means of support.

He became a composer of operas: within a few years he produced Les deux Reines (staged in August 1835); Le Luthier de Vienne (June 1836); Piquillo 3 acts (October 1837); Un Conte d'Autrefois (February 1838); Perugina (December 1838); Le Planteur, 2 acts (March 1839); La chaste Suzanne, 4 acts (December 1839); and La Reine Jeanne, 3 acts (October 1840). Gustave Chouquet wrote: "These operas bear evident traces of the self-sufficient and ignorant composer of romances, the slovenly and incorrect musician, and the poor instrumentalist which we know Monpou to have been; but quite as apparent are melody, dramatic fire and instinct, and a certain happy knack. His progress was undeniable, but he never became a really good musician."

Unfortunately he overworked himself, and became seriously ill. He was advised to leave Paris, but he became worse, and died in Orléans on 10 August 1841. He left unfinished Lambert Simnel, completed by Adolphe Adam and staged in September 1843, and a short opéra-comique, L'Orfèvre, which remained unperformed.
