= La guerre des femmes =

La Guerre des femmes is an 1845 novel by Alexandre Dumas père. Set during the Fronde, the novel tells the story of naive Gascon soldier, Baron des Canolles, who is torn between love for two women.

First translated by Samuel Springer as The War of Women for Potter Publishers, following a new French edition in 2003 it was re-translated as The Women's War in 2006 by Robin Buss.
