= Eugène Gautier =

French classical violinist and composer

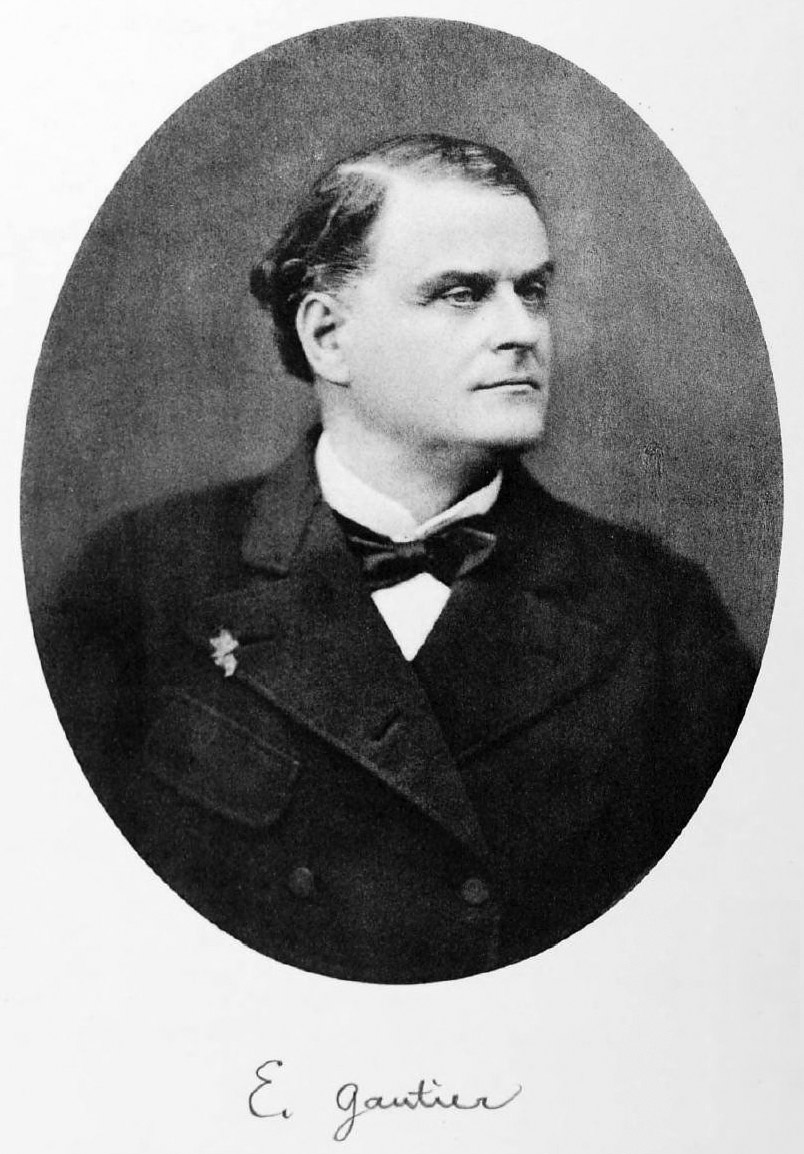
Portrait of Eugène Gautier

Eugène Gautier (27 February 1822 in Vaugirard (then a suburb of Paris) – 1 April 1878 in Paris) was a French classical violinist and composer.

He was a teacher of history of music at the Conservatoire de Paris from 1872.

Gautier is buried in the 1st division of the Père-Lachaise Cemetery.

== Sources ==
- Moiroux, Jules (1908). Le cimetière du Père Lachaise. Paris: S. Mercadier. p. 171.
- Gautier, Eugène (1873). Un musicien en vacances; études et souvenirs (in French). Paris: Éditions Alphonse Leduc. p. 299. OCLC 457666916. BnF 30489712t.
