= List of operas by Ambroise Thomas =

This is a list of operas by Ambroise Thomas (1811–1896). All premieres took place in Paris unless otherwise noted.

Title	Genre	Subdivisions	Libretto	Première date	Theatre
La double échelle	opéra comique	1 act	Eugène de Planard	23 August 1837	Opéra-Comique, Salle de la Bourse
Le perruquier de la régence	opéra comique	3 acts	Eugène de Planard and Paul Dupont	30 March 1838	Opéra-Comique, Salle de la Bourse
Le panier fleuri	opéra comique	1 act	Adolphe de Leuven (Adolphe de Ribbing) and Léon Lhérie (Léon Levy Brunswick)	6 May 1839	Opéra-Comique, Salle de la Bourse
Carline	opéra comique	3 acts	Adolphe de Leuven and Léon Levy Brunswick	24 February 1840	Opéra-Comique, Salle de la Bourse
Le comte de Carmagnola	opéra	2 acts	Eugène Scribe	19 April 1841	Paris Opera, Salle Le Peletier
Le guerillero	opéra	2 acts	Théodore Anne	22 June 1842	Paris Opera, Salle Le Peletier
Angélique et Médor	opéra comique	1 act	Thomas-Marie-François Sauvage	10 May 1843	Opéra-Comique, Salle Favart II
Mina, ou Le ménage à trois	opéra comique	3 acts	Eugène de Planard	10 October 1843	Opéra-Comique, Salle Favart II
Le caïd	opéra comique	2 acts	Thomas-Marie-François Sauvage; original title: Les Boudjous	3 January 1849	Opéra-Comique, Salle Favart II
Le songe d'une nuit d'été	opéra comique	3 acts	Joseph-Bernard Rosier and Adolphe de Leuven	20 April 1850	Opéra-Comique, Salle Favart II
Raymond or: Le secret de la reine	opéra comique	3 acts	Joseph Bernard Rosier and Adolphe de Leuven	5 June 1851	Opéra-Comique, Salle Favart II
La Tonelli	opéra comique	2 acts	Thomas Marie François Sauvage	30 March 1853	Opéra-Comique, Salle Favart II
La cour de Célimène	opéra comique	2 acts	Joseph Bernard Rosier	11 April 1855	Opéra-Comique, Salle Favart II
Psyché	opéra comique	3 acts	Jules Barbier and Michel Carré	26 January 1857	Opéra-Comique, Salle Favart II
Le carnaval de Venise	opéra comique	3 acts	Thomas Marie François Sauvage	9 December 1857	Opéra-Comique, Salle Favart II
Gillotin et son père	opéra	1 act	Thomas Marie François Sauvage	composed 1859	(unperformed)
Le roman d'Elvire	opéra comique	3 acts	Alexandre Dumas, père and Adolphe de Leuven	4 February 1860	Opéra-Comique, Salle Favart II
Mignon	opéra comique	3 acts	Jules Barbier and Michel Carré, after Wilhelm Meisters Lehrjahre (1795–1796) by Johann Wolfgang von Goethe	17 November 1866	Opéra-Comique, Salle Favart II
Hamlet	opéra	5 acts	Jules Barbier and Michel Carré, after the drama by William Shakespeare	9 March 1868	Paris Opera, Salle Le Peletier
Mignon	opéra: revised version in Italian, with recitatives	3 acts	Translated by Giuseppe Zaffira from the French libretto by Jules Barbier and Michel Carré	5 July 1870	Drury Lane Theatre, London
Gille et Gillotin (revision of Gillotin et son père)	opéra	1 act	Thomas Marie François Sauvage	22 April 1874	Opéra-Comique, Salle Favart II
Psyché (second version)	opéra comique	4 acts	Jules Barbier and Michel Carré	21 May 1878	Opéra-Comique, Salle Favart II
Françoise de Rimini	opéra	5 acts	Jules Barbier and Michel Carré, after La divina commedia: Inferno (1309) by Dante Alighieri	14 April 1882	Paris Opera, Palais Garnier
Le songe d'une nuit d'été (second version, with recitatives)	opéra comique	3 acts	Joseph Bernard Rosier and Adolphe de Leuven	19 April 1886	Opéra-Comique, Salle Favart II
