= Laura Claycomb =

American opera singer (born 1968)

Laura Claycomb (born August 23, 1968) is an American lyric coloratura soprano singer.

== Background ==
Claycomb was born in Corpus Christi, Texas, but grew up in Dallas, where she excelled in church and school choir, winning numerous youth competitions, such as the National Association of Teachers of Singing, U.I.L., and Texas All-State Choir. A graduate of Highland Park High School, Claycomb won a full scholarship to Southern Methodist University, where she studied voice with Barbara Hill Moore, and completed two bachelor's degrees in vocal performance and foreign languages. She studied with the late Norma Newton from 1994 until Newton's death in 2008.

She won the Silver Medal at the International Tchaikovsky Competition in Moscow in 1994, the Operetta Prize at the International Hans Gabor Belvedere Singing Competition in Vienna in 1992, and First Prize in the National Opera Association Competition in 1992.

== Early career ==
She gained international attention for the first time in 1994 after stepping in at the last minute to perform Giulietta in I Capuleti e i Montecchi with Geneva Opera. This role was also the vehicle of her debut at the Opéra Bastille in Paris, with the Munich Radio Orchestra, Los Angeles Opera and Pittsburgh Opera.

Another of her roles is Gilda in Rigoletto, which she has performed at the Canadian Opera Company, Lausanne Opera, Opéra Bastille, Pittsburgh Opera, Israeli Opera, Municipal Theatre of Santiago , Canadian Opera Company, Teatro Municipale Giuseppe Verdi Salerno, Houston Grand Opera, and the Dallas Opera.

Her Lucia di Lammermoor at the Houston Grand Opera "literally catapulted the opening night audience to its feet with her creativity and versatility." (Don Moser, Houston Voice).

Other notable roles have been her Linda di Chamounix; Marie in La fille du régiment; La Comtesse Adèle in Le comte Ory, Cleopatra in Giulio Cesare; Morgana in Alcina; Olympia in Les contes d'Hoffmann, and Ophélie in Hamlet.

She got her start at San Francisco Opera where she held an Adler Fellowship, singing roles such as Xenia in Boris Godunov, Papagena in Die Zauberflöte, Duchesse Medina-Sidonia in Milhaud's Christoph Colombe, Marie in La fille du régiment and Fiakermilli in Arabella. Her role-debut of Zerbinetta in Ariadne auf Naxos was the vehicle of her return to San Francisco Opera in 2002. She reprised the role at the Richard-Strauss-Festspiele in Garmisch with Ulf Schirmer, Los Angeles Opera, Houston Grand Opera and at the Glyndebourne Festival in 2013.

== Career performances ==
Following her European debut in Geneva, she sang Marie at Turin's Teatro Regio in Luca Ronconi's production and again as Ismene in Graham Vick's production of Mitridate, Rè di Ponto. She followed with Princess Rezia in Haydn's L'incontro improvviso for L'Opéra de Nice and L'Opéra de Bordeaux, and Serpetta in Mozart's La finta giardiniera at the Kennedy Center in Washington, D.C., with Patrick Summers conducting.

After her debut at La Scala in the title role of Linda di Chamounix with Marcelo Álvarez, she sang Marie in Rome and her first Sophie in Keith Warner's production of Der Rosenkavalier at the Spoleto Festival in Italy. Other appearances include her role-debut at the Lausanne Opera as Adina in L'elisir d'amore and as Konstanze in Die Entführung aus dem Serail with Vlaamse Opera, a role she reprised at the Berlin Staatsoper and again in 2011 at the Grand Théâtre de Genève.

Following success at Houston Grand Opera as Gilda in Rigoletto in 2001, Claycomb forged a special relationship with audiences in Houston, returning to sing Lucia di Lammermoor, Cleopatra in Giulio Cesare, Ilia in Idomeneo and the title role of La fille du régiment.

In Trieste, Claycomb debuted the role of Ophelie in Thomas' Hamlet; in Toulouse, she debuted Philine in Mignon; and at Brussels' La Monnaie, she debuted Tytania in Britten's A Midsummer Night's Dream.

== Baroque opera ==
In the Baroque style, she has sung with some of the world's most renowned early music conductors and ensembles. She sang Cleopatra in Handel's Giulio Cesare in Montpellier, Drusilla in Monteverdi's L'incoronazione di Poppea at the Netherlands Opera, and Fedra in Traetta's Ippolito ed Aricia in Montpellier with Christophe Rousset and Les Talens Lyriques. She reprised the role of Cleopatra for the Drottningholm Festival with Roy Goodman conducting and more recently at Houston Grand Opera with music director Patrick Summers. With Richard Hickox, Claycomb debuted the role of Morgana in Alcina at English National Opera. With Marc Minkowski and Les Musiciens du Louvre, she debuted the role of Ginevra in Ariodante at the Opéra Garnier in Paris; Claycomb reprised the role in Munich with Harry Bicket. She debuted the title role of Semele at the Flemish Opera with Michael Hofstetter conducting. In 2008, she sang Polissena in Radamisto in a new David Alden production at Santa Fe with Harry Bicket conducting.

Claycomb also has a close relationship with Baroque conductor Emmanuelle Haïm, and performed a varied French and Italian Baroque repertoire with Haïm on tour in the United States (St. Paul Chamber Orchestra and New World Symphony) and with her group Le Concert d'Astrée at the Aldeburgh Festival, in Paris, on tour in France, on BBC Radio. The soprano performed excerpts with countertenor David Daniels at the 2007 Cortona Festival in Italy with Haïm and le Concert d'Astrée. Her first recording collaboration with Haïm is Händel's Arcadian duets on Virgin Veritas/EMI. In December 2011, she celebrated the orchestra's 10-year anniversary in a Gala at the Théâtre des Champs-Elysées, Paris, rebroadcast by France Musique.

== Modern music ==
In modern music, she made her debut at the Salzburg Festival in Peter Sellars's new production of Ligeti's Le Grand Macabre, reprising the role of Amanda in the same production at the Théâtre du Châtelet in Paris. She can be heard on the Grammy-nominated recording of Le Grand Macabre for Sony with Esa-Pekka Salonen conducting. Concerts of Humperdinck's Hänsel und Gretel (role debut as Gretel) with the London Symphony Orchestra, Copland's The Tender Land (role debut as Laurie Moss), The Rake's Progress (role debut as Anne Trulove) all at London's Barbican, as well as Mistress Page in Vaughan Williams' Sir John in Love in Newcastle with the Northern Sinfonia and its recording for Chandos are some highlights of her operatic collaboration with conductor Richard Hickox. Claycomb debuted Cunegonde in Candide at Opera Pacific with John Demain and reprised the role with Maggio Musicale Fiorentino in 2016. In 2006, Claycomb originated the role of Queen Wealtheow in Elliot Goldenthal's opera Grendel in a Julie Taymor production with Los Angeles Opera and Lincoln Center Festival. She added Anne Trulove in the Rake's Progress to her stage roles in 2007 with a new Robert Lepage production she originated at Brussels' La Monnaie and reprised at the Opéra de Lyon, reprising the role at the Paris Opera in 2008 in a new Olivier Py production. In 2015, Claycomb created the role of Hester Prynne in the world premiere of Lori Laitman's The Scarlet Letter at Opera Colorado as well as singing Leonard Bernstein's Kaddish (Symphony No. 3) for the first time with the RAI National Symphony Orchestra in Turin.

== Concerts ==
In concert music, with Esa-Pekka Salonen, she has sung Debussy's Le martyre de Saint Sébastien (Angel) with the Swedish Radio Orchestra and Mendelssohn's A Midsummer Night's Dream with the Los Angeles Philharmonic. Claycomb sang the world-premiere of Salonen's Five Fragments After Sappho with the composer conducting at the Ojai Festival, with the Los Angeles Philharmonic in Los Angeles, with the London Sinfonietta at the Queen Elizabeth Hall, and with Ensemble Sospeso at Carnegie Hall. She reprised the Sappho songs with Ensemble Modern in Japan on a program including Stravinsky's Japanese Lyrics and [Balmont] Songs with Dominique My conducting.

She was the soprano soloist in Carmina Burana at the re-opening gala of the Blossom Festival with the Cleveland Orchestra with Franz Welser-Möst conducting, again in the Messiah again with Cleveland Orchestra at Severance Hall, returned with Pierre Boulez for the title role of Stravinsky's Rossignol and with Matthias Pintscher in Debussy's Le Martyr de St. Sebastien. With Sir Roger Norrington and the Stuttgart Radio Orchestra, Claycomb has made tours as Teresa in Berlioz's Benvenuto Cellini (recorded for Hanssler Classics) and as the soprano soloist in Vaughan Williams' A Sea Symphony. Among her many appearances with the San Francisco Symphony and Michael Tilson Thomas, she sang concerts of Schoenberg's Herzgewächse and Toch's Chinesische Flöte, concerts and a recording of Mahler's Symphony No. 4 for San Francisco Symphony's own label, Mahler's Symphony No. 8, Fauré Requiem, Brahms Requiem, and concerts of Strauss' Brentano Lieder. With the London Symphony Orchestra, Claycomb sang Humperdinck's Hänsel und Gretel with Richard Hickox conducting, Mahler's Symphony No. 2 with Andrew Davis conducting, Carmina Burana and Barber's Knoxville, Summer of 1915 with Hickox conducting, as well as concerts of Berlioz's Benvenuto Cellini with Sir Colin Davis (recorded for LSO Live label). She joined the LSO for Mahler's fourth symphony with Valery Gergiev in London and Athens, and in 2017, sang Bernstein's Kaddish with the orchestra and Marin Alsop.

Her collaboration in concert with Richard Hickox in addition to their many operatic collaborations also includes Grainger at the BBC Proms, Vaughan Williams' A Sea Symphony at the Gulbenkian in Lisbon, Haydn's Creation at the Spoleto Festival and Handel's Messiah with the San Francisco Symphony Orchestra.

In London's Royal Albert Hall, she sang a Mozart program including Der Schauspieldirektor with Iván Fischer and the Orchestra of the Age of Enlightenment, which was also broadcast on BBC Radio. On another all-Mozart program in Switzerland, Claycomb was the feature, singing a program of 6 concert arias with the Orchestre de Chambre de Lausanne and conductor Jonathan Darlington. She appeared as Madame Silberklang in Der Schauspieldirektor with the Munich Radio Orchestra and Sebastian Weigle, and another Mozart concert with Ulf Schirmer. Claycomb also performed Beethoven's rarely heard oratorio Christus am Ölberg with the Flemish Opera Orchestra and Ivan Törz, as well as with Pinchas Steinberg and the Orchestra of Santa Cecilia in Rome.

She sang her first Brahms Ein deutsches Requiem at the Teatro Lirico di Cagliari with Gerard Korsten, a concert of bel canto excerpts with John Demain and Opera Pacific as well as at the Lanaudière Festival with Yannick Nézet-Séguin, and was the feature of New Year's concerts with Vlaamse Opera, with George Pehlavanian conducting.

With an avid interest in recital repertoire, chamber music, and neglected composers, she combines this music into her recital schedule with pianists Roger Vignoles, Peter Grunberg, Keith Weber and Iain Burnside. In past years, Claycomb reprised Messiaen's Chants de terre et de ciel with Grunberg on "Cal Performances" to rave reviews, as well performing three world-premieres at One World Theater in Austin on a chamber concert with Nina Kotova, José Feghali, and Ron Neal. Her recitals have taken her from San Francisco to Chicago, San Antonio, San Marcos, Austin, Houston, Georgetown (TX), Brussels, Bruges (Concertgebouw), Santiago de Compostela (Spain), the Tuscan Sun Festival in Cortona, Italy and a BBC Voices recital on English radio.

== Awards ==
Claycomb was the recipient of the 2011 Maria Callas Debut Artist Award for her performances as Gilda in Dallas Opera's production of Rigoletto, the 2000 Pegasus Prize at the Spoleto Festival in Italy, and 2019 Distinguished Alumni Award for Highland Park High School, among many prizes. She makes her home in Italy.

== Recordings and videos ==
- Ligeti: Le Grand Macabre / Salonen, Philharmonia Orchestra, Willard White, Graham Clark, Sybille Ehlert, Jard van Nes, Frode Olsen, Charlotte Hellekant, Steven Cole, Derek Lee Ragin. Sony B00000ICMU CD, 1999
- Vaughan Williams: Sir John in Love / Richard Hickox / Anne-Marie Owens, Sarah Connolly, Northern Sinfonia and Chorus, Brian Bannatyne-Scott, Donald Maxwell, Roderick Williams, Susan Gritton, Matthew Best, Mark Padmore, Stephen Varcoe, Stephan Loges, John Bowen, Richard Lloyd-Morgan, Laura Claycomb, Henry Moss, Mark Richardson Chandos, B00005M0ER, CD/MP3, 2001
- Handel: Arcadian Duets / Dessay, Gens, Asawa, Haim, et al., Virgin 07243545524272002, CD/MP3, 2001
- Mahler: Symphony No. 4 / Tilson Thomas, Claycomb, San Francisco SO/DELOS SACD Hybrid, 2002
- Il Salotto Vol 6 – La Partenza / Laura Claycomb, Bruce Ford, Manuela Custer, Roberto Servile, Dominic Natoli, Nicola Rossi Giordano, Dean Robinson, Brindley Sherratt / Opera Rara ORR227 CD, 2004
- Il Salotto Vol 7 – Primo Dolce Affano / Bruce Ford, Elizabeth Vidal, Laura Claycomb, Manuela Custer, William Matteuzzi, Roberto Servile, Alastair Miles, piano – David Harper / Opera Rara ORR230 CD, 2005
- Vocal Teamwork / Annick Massis, Bruce Ford, Majella Cullagh, Alastair Miles, Jennifer Larmore, Mirco Palazzi, Laura Claycomb, Peter Glossop, Della Jones, Alexander Oliver, Yvonne Kenny, Rockwell Blake, Daniela Barcellona, William Matteuzzi, Jane Eaglen, Christian du Plessis, Deborah Cook. London Philharmonic Orchestra, BBC Concert Orchestra, Philharmonia Orchestra – conductors David Parry, James Judd, Giuliano Carella / Opera Rara ORR233 CD, 2005
- Meyerbeer: L'esule di Granata (Highlights) / Manuela Custer, Laura Claycomb, Mirco Palazzi, Paul Austin Kelly, Brindley Sherratt, Ashley Catling. Geoffrey Mitchell Choir, Academy of St Martin in the Fields, Giuliano Carella – conductor / Opera Rara ORR234 CD, 2006
- Berlioz: Benvenuto Cellini / Norrington / SWR Stuttgart Radio Orchestra / Ford, Maltman, Ekkehard Vogler, Franz Hawlata, Ralf Lukas, Reinhard Mayr, Johannes Chum, Middle German Radio Chorus-Leipzig, 2007
- Entre Nous: Celebrating Offenbach / Jennifer Larmore, Alastair Miles, Yvonne Kenny, Mark Stone, Diana Montague, Laura Claycomb, Elizabeth Vidal, Colin Lee, Loïc Félix, Mark Wilde, Cassandre Berthon, Mark le Brocq, Alexandra Sherman, Andre Cognet. London Philharmonic Orchestra, Geoffrey Mitchell Choir, David Parry – conductor / Opera Rara ORR243 CD, 2007
- Pacini: Alessandro nelle Indie / Bruce Ford, Jennifer Larmore, Laura Claycomb, Mark Wilde, Dean Robinson. London Philharmonic Orchestra, Geoffrey Mitchell Choir, David Parry – conductor/ Opera Rara ORC35 CD, 2008
- Berlioz: Benvenuto Cellini / Colin Davis / London Symphony Orchestra / London Symphony Chorus / Gregory Kunde, Laura Claycomb, Darren Jeffery, Peter Coleman-Wright, Andrew Kennedy, Isabelle Cals, Jacques Imbrailo, John Relyea, Andrew Foster-Williams, Alasdair Elliott, 2008
- Ambroise Thomas: La cour de Célimène / Laura Claycomb, Joan Rodgers, Alastair Miles, Sébastien Droy, Nicole Tibbels. Geoffrey Mitchell Choir, Philharmonia Orchestra, Andrew Litton – conductor/ Opera Rara ORC37 CD, 2008
- Stravinsky: The Rake's Progress / Laura Claycomb, Andrew Kennedy, William Shimell, Julianne Young, Dagmar Pecková / Robert LePage, Théâtre de la Monnaie, Kazushi Ono / "BBC/OPUS ARTE" B00118DQY2 DVD, 2008
- Fabrizio Cassol/Bach: Pitié! / AKA MOON, Laura Claycomb, Melissa Givens, Cristina Zavalloni, Serge Kakudji, Magic Malik, Airelle Besson, Sanne Van Hek, Tcha Limberger, Philippe Thurion, Lode Vercampt, Monica Brett-Crowther, Alexandre Cavalière / Cypress Records, CD, 2008
- Carl Orff: Carmina Burana / Richard Hickox – Conductor, London Symphony Orchestra, Laura Claycomb, Barry Banks, Christopher Maltman / CHANDOS CD, 2008
- Mahler: Symphony No 8 / Michael Tilson Thomas – Conductor, Erin Wall, Elza van den Heever, Laura Claycomb, Katarina Karnéus, Yvonne Naef, Anthony Dean Griffey, Quinn Kelsey, James Morris, San Francisco Symphony Chorus, San Francisco Girls Chorus, Pacific Boychoir, San Francisco Symphony / San Francisco Symphony Label, SACD, 2008
