= Le songe d'une nuit d'été =

- Opéra comique by Ambroise Thomas
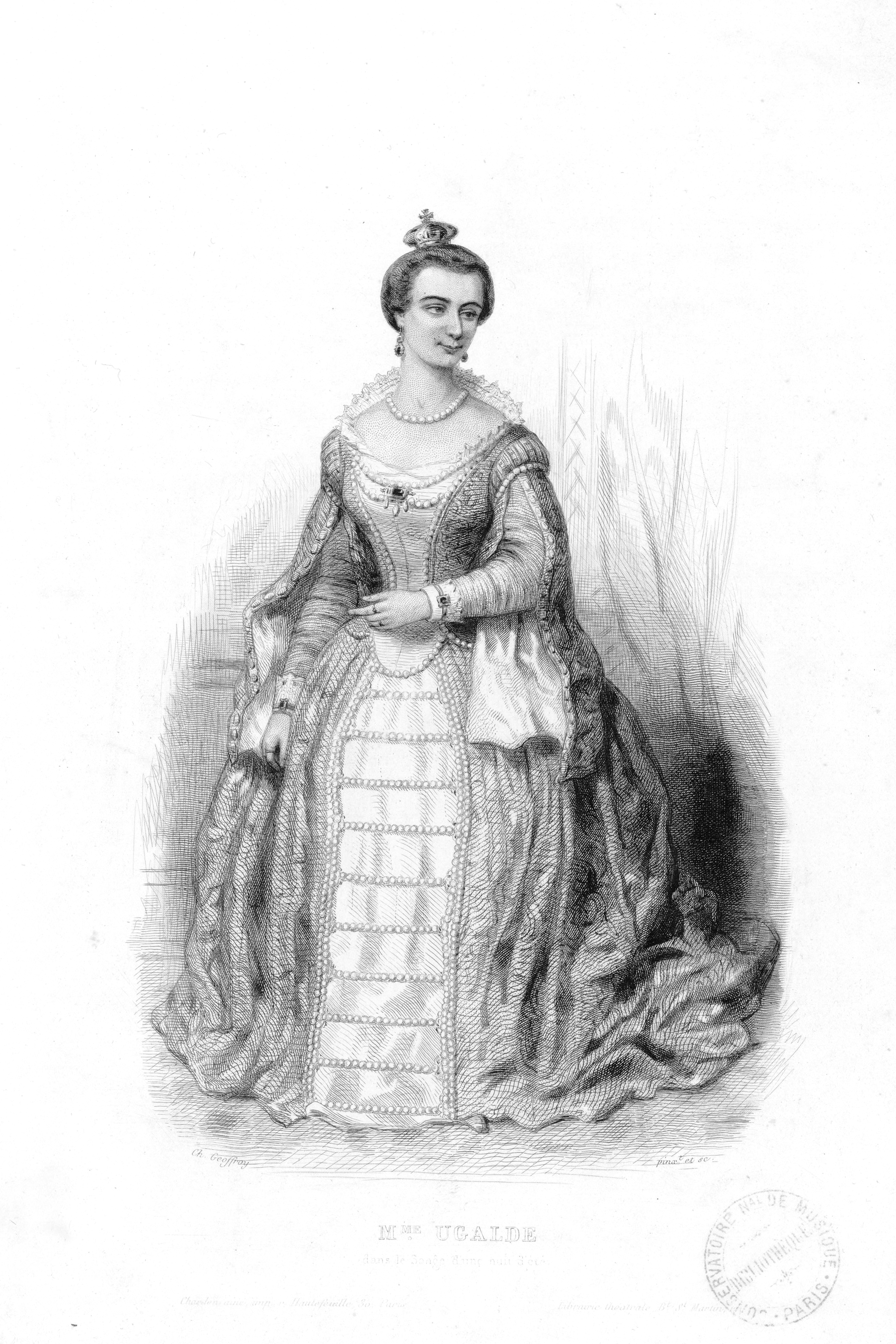
- Delphine Ugalde as Elizabeth
- Librettist: Joseph-Bernard Rosier; Adolphe de Leuven
- Language: French
- Premiere: 20 April 1850; Opéra-Comique, Paris

Le songe d'une nuit d'été (A Midsummer Night's Dream) is an opéra-comique in three acts composed by Ambroise Thomas to a French libretto by Joseph-Bernard Rosier and Adolphe de Leuven. Although it shares the French title for Shakespeare's play, A Midsummer Night's Dream, its plot is not based on the play. Shakespeare himself is a character in the opera as are Elizabeth I and Falstaff.

== Performance history ==
The opera was premiered on 20 April 1850 by the Opéra-Comique at the second Salle Favart in Paris. The role of Elizabeth was intended for Delphine Ugalde, who was too ill to sing at the premiere but later took over the part. English commentators often find certain aspects of the plot in questionable taste. However, the opera was very successful in France. It was revived at the Opéra-Comique on 22 September 1859 and again during the International Exposition of 1867 with Marie Cabel, Victor Capoul, Léon Achard, and Pierre Gailhard in the cast.

A revised version was mounted on 17 April 1886 with Adèle Isaac as the Queen. According to The New York Times reviewer in Paris, she acted "with rare discretion and dignity, and the wide scope of the register taxed by the composer is wonderfully served by her natural voice, in which the low tones are as full and reliable as the upper notes are easy, sweet, and flutelike. Her perfect vocalization permits the wildest flights into the most elevated realm of stacatti and trill, while the many dramatic recitatives are just as well served by her sure instinct and by the homogeneous quality and range of her registers. From the beginning to the end, even in the taxation of the cadenze of the second act, her full, rich tones were as sure, as melodious, as velvety, and as flexible as if she were not accomplishing almost impossible feats of execution." The cast also included Victor Maurel as Shakespeare and the baritone Émile-Alexandre Taskin as "the stout, ponderous … Falstaff, and the extension of his voice permits him to give full value to the part originally written for a bass."

Internationally, the opera was first performed in Liège on 24 March 1851, Brussels on 27 September 1851, New Orleans in 1851, and Frankfurt (in German) on 22 April 1852. In New York it was presented by the New Orleans company in French on 21 June 1852 at Niblo's Garden. It was not well received by the critic of the Spirit of the Times (26 June 1852), who wrote: "Queen Elizabeth, Falstaff, and Shakespeare are introduced under the most ridiculous circumstances, and in absurd relations to each other. We could forgive our Gallic friends for scandalizing Queen Bess and rendering fat Jack ridiculous, but to profane the memory of the sweet Swan of Avon by introducing his name into such balderdash is at once an insult to all who reverence him and an evidence that the French are wholly ignorant of his glorious works. Poor fellows!" The opera was first presented in English in New York on 15 October 1877 in a translation by M. A. Cooney.

Other international first performances include Vienna (in German) on 12 January 1854, Berlin (in German) on 2 February 1854, Geneva in March 1854, Buenos Aires on 7 October 1854, Barcelona on 1 August 1868, Lisbon on 10 April 1878, Mexico on 24 April 1879, Padua (in Italian) on 24 February 1897, and Glasgow (in English as A Poet's Dream, translated by W. B. Kingston) on 18 February 1898.

Twentieth-century performances include a revival in Paris at the Trianon-Lyrique on 12 November 1915, one in Lille as late as 13 February 1936, and another in Brussels on 27 September 1937. The opera was revived (for the inauguration of the Channel Tunnel) on 7 May 1994 at the Théâtre Impérial de Compiègne by Pierre Jourdan and was later released on DVD.

== Roles ==
Roles, voice types, premiere cast
Role	Voice type	Premiere cast, 20 April 1850
Queen Elizabeth I	soprano	Constance-Caroline Lefèbvre
Olivia	soprano	Sophie Grimm
Shakespeare	tenor	Joseph-Antoine-Charles Couderc
Falstaff	bass	Eugène Bataille
Lord Latimer	tenor	Jean-Jacques Boulo
Actors and actresses, ladies and gentlemen of the court, foresters, tavern servants, cooks, sommeliers, and kitchen boys

== Synopsis ==
Setting: Sixteenth-century England

=== Act 1 ===
The Tavern of the Siren in Richmond, London

In some unexplained way Queen Elizabeth and Olivia, her maid of honor, were separated from the royal cortège in the park at Richmond. Having been pursued by sailors, they take refuge in a tavern, where they find William Shakespeare, surrounded by his comrades, occupied in drinking. The Queen, who is masked, tries in vain to recall to the mind of the poet a sense of better things. He mocks at her preaching, and goes on drinking. Presently he rolls under the table, and presents a shocking spectacle of intoxication. Elizabeth orders Sir John Falstaff, governor of Richmond Palace, to transport Shakespeare to the park surrounding that palace.

=== Act 2 ===
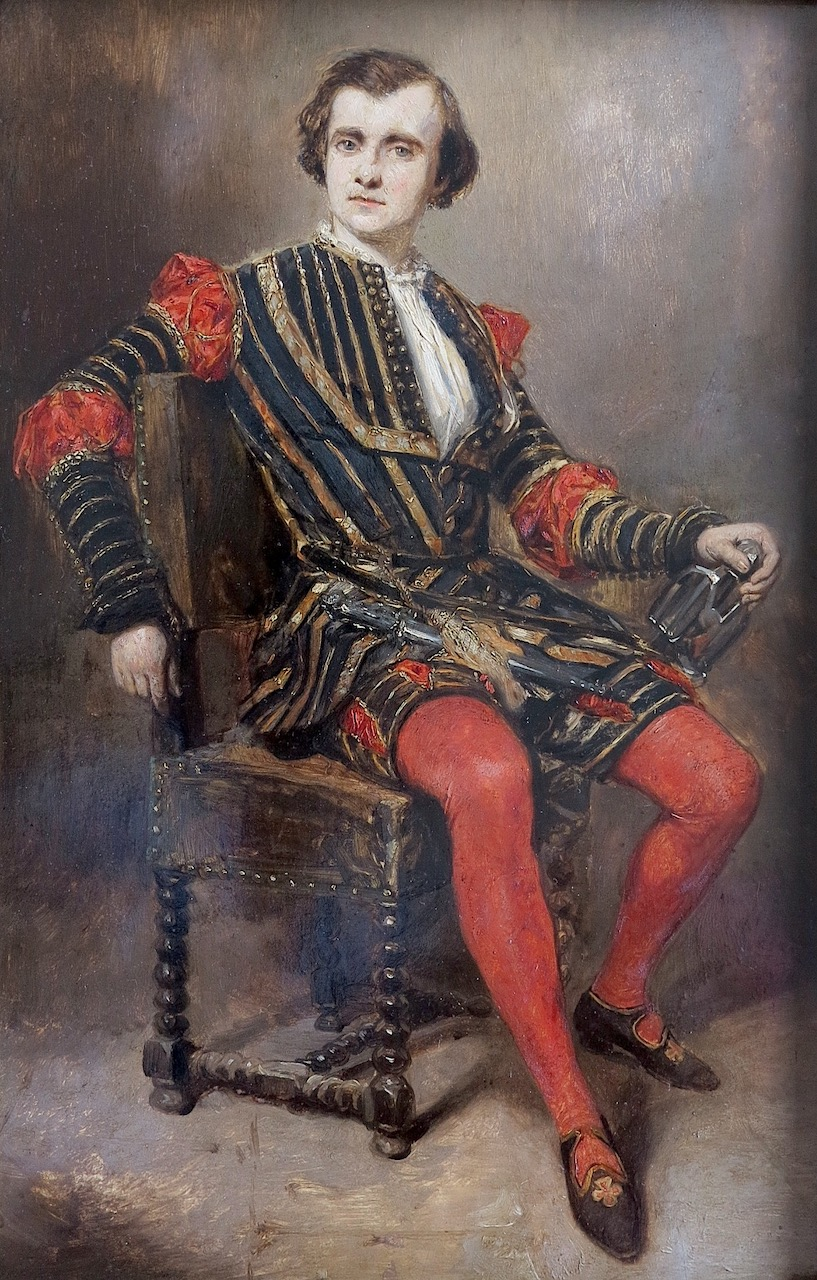
Eustache Lorsay, Jean-Jacques Boulo as Lord Latimer, 1850 (Paris, Bibliothèque-Musée de l'Opéra National de Paris)

The park of Richmond Palace

It is night; the waters of the lake, the moonlight shining through the branches of the trees, the general effect of a deep forest, all combine to confuse the senses of Shakespeare upon his awakening. He hears harmonious sounds; presently he sees a white form, and a voice is heard. It is that of his muse, who reproaches him for his neglect and his threatened abandonment of her. The poet, instantly captivated by the apparition, soon perceives that his good genius is no other than a charming woman. He advances towards her, and Olivia, terrified by the situation in which the Queen has placed herself by impersonating the apparition, substitutes herself for her royal mistress.

Latimer, an admirer of Olivia is nearby and having seen Shakespeare's responses, and despite the poet's protests, challenges him to a duel. The encounter takes place immediately, and after a few passes Latimer falls. Olivia is dismayed, and, joined by the Queen, betrays the royal incognita. Shakespeare, who believes that he has killed Lord Latimer, takes flight and throws himself into the river. He is fished out in a faint and carried to his lodgings.

=== Act 3 ===
Whitehall Palace

The Queen orders Sir John and the other actors in this nocturnal comedy to forget everything that they have seen, and then sends for Shakespeare. The poet immediately imagines that the Queen is in love with him. He arrives transported with rapture and finds himself received and mocked as a dreamer. Elizabeth alone has pity upon his despair, and says to the poet: "But for you the events of this night shall be a dream to all the world," meaning, no doubt, that in that night's happenings the inspiration should be found for Shakespeare's exquisite fantasy, A Midsummer Night's Dream.

== Video recording ==
- 1994: Ghyslaine Raphanel (soprano, Elisabeth I); Alain Gabriel (tenor, William Shakespeare); Jean-Philippe Courtis (bass, Falstaff); Cécile Besnard (soprano, Olivia); Franco Ferrazzi (tenor, Lord Latimer); Gilles Dubernet (baritone, Jeremy); Chœurs du Théâtre français de la musique, Orchestre symphonique de la radio et télévision de Cracovie, Michel Swierczewski (conductor); produced and directed by Pierre Jourdin; costumes by the Royal Shakespeare Company; recorded live on 7 May 1994 at the Théâtre Impérial de Compiègne; released on Cascavalle (2003) and Kultur (2005).
