= Myron A. Cooney =

Musician and critic

Myron Angelo Cooney (1841 – June 21, 1898) was an Irish-born musician, critic, and composer who lived in New York. He was music critic for the New York Herald for much of 1865 to 1884. From 1885 to 1891 he edited the Argus newspaper in Albany. Afterwards he was a legislative correspondent for various papers and was a clerk for the Department of Public Instruction.

He was born in Dublin, Ireland. He moved to the United States in 1860. He was a war correspondent for the Herald before becoming its music critic.

He was suspended from the Herald in the wake of a dispute with pianist J. N. Pattison. The Dramatic New defended him and stated he was the "best technical music critic in our midst."

He wrote the music for "Kiss No One But Me". His song "Fifth Avenue Galop" was published in 1870. He wrote the song "Sunshine and Shadow" published in 1871. He wrote an English libretto for The Chines of Normandy. He wrote Nautilus Waltzes music (instrumental) published by Wm. M. Hall & Son in New York.

He translated the work of Ambroise Thomas for English opera. He died in Albany, New York.
