= La cour de Célimène =

Opéra comique by Ambroise Thomas

- Opéra comique by Ambroise Thomas
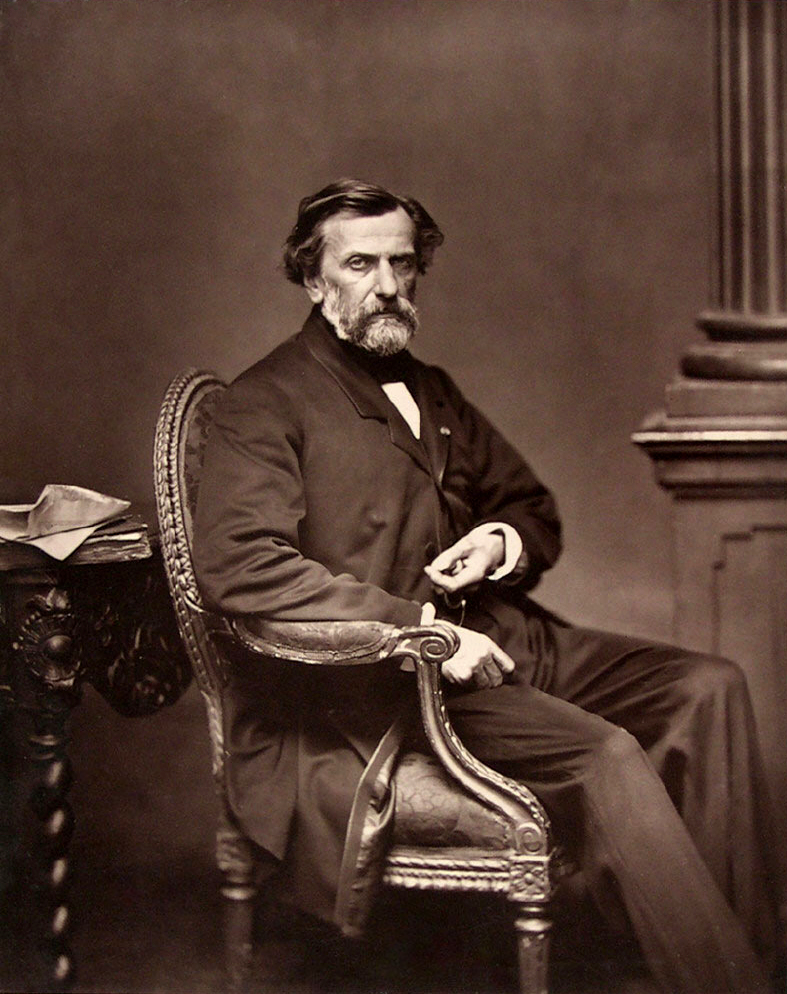
- The composer
- Librettist: Joseph-Bernard Rosier
- Language: French
- Premiere: 11 April 1855; Opéra-Comique, Paris

La cour de Célimène (The Court of Célimène), also known as Les douze (The dozen) is an opéra comique in two acts by French composer Ambroise Thomas. The original French libretto was by Joseph-Bernard Rosier (1804–1880). The principal character, the Countess, is not named, but her nickname in the opera, Célimène, refers to a character in Molière's drama Le Misanthrope who has a large number of suitors.

== Performance history ==
The premiere took place at the second Salle Favart on 11 April 1855. It received nineteen performances, but was forgotten until a recording by Opera Rara was released in 2008.

The opera returned to the stage for the first time in nearly a century and a half on 21 October 2011, when it opened the 60th season of Wexford Festival Opera.

== Roles ==
| Role | Voice type | Premiere Cast, 11 April 1855 (Conductor: ) |
|---|---|---|
| La Comtesse, a widow | soprano | Marie Caroline Miolan-Carvalho |
| La Baronne, her sister, also widowed | soprano | Pauline-Désirée Dejon (Paolina Colson-Marchand) |
| Le Commandeur de Beaupré | bass | Charles Battaille |
| The Chevalier de Mérac, one of the Countess's suitors | tenor | Pierre-Marius-Victor Jourdan |
| Bretonne, the Countess's maid/confidante | soprano | |
Four adolescent suitors, four youthful suitors, four old suitors

== Synopsis ==
Place: A chateau in Paris
Time: 1750

=== Act 1 ===
The Countess's garden in the evening

Twelve of the Countess's admirers are expecting her to arrive soon. There are four breeches role adolescents, four young men and four old men, who all prowl around, bumping into each other and swearing that each is the Countess's favourite. She appears with Bretonne and her maids, and her sister the Baroness also arrives. The suitors are sent packing.

The Countess, whose late husband was a philanderer, is determined to break her admirers' hearts. The Baroness disapproves of her immorality. The Commander, who is engaged to the Countess, enters. He is flattered by her attention and does not mind her flirting with her admirers. He is happy to be living on the sisters' estate and regards it as beneficial to his health.

Another suitor, a young Gascon called the Chevalier, whom the Countess met in Aix-en-Provence, is announced. The Baroness and Commander hide while the Countess twists the nervous Chevalier round her little finger before telling him that she is engaged to the Commander.

The suitors reappear, horrified to hear that the Countess will not be marrying any of them. The Chevalier and the Commander start to argue, and they eventually challenge each other to a duel. The twelve suitors will be their seconds.

=== Act 2 ===
The Countess's boudoir.

Surrounded by love-letters and flowers, the Countess is in a reflective mood. She imagines a lover and then another - each can be dispensed with, as there are plenty more to replace them.

Bretonne appears, and is delighted when the Countess gives her some of the bouquets and love-letters. The Baroness now arrives, followed by all of the duellists' exhausted seconds. They denounce the Countess, but she convinces them individually that each is still her favourite.

The suitors tell the Countess that the Commander has been seriously wounded by the Chevalier. He enters, bandaged and dishevelled, and ashamed to have lost the duel for the Countess. Wishing to continue to live on the estate, he asks the Baroness for her hand. The Countess is alarmed - will she now be obliged to marry the Chevalier? She and the Commander leave and the Chevalier enters, commending the Commander as an honourable gentleman, and keen to exact revenge from the fickle Countess. The Baroness suggests that he might now find a more loving woman (she means a reformed Countess), but the Chevalier assumes that the Baroness is putting herself forward, and that she will marry him forthwith. He is delighted, and disappears to collect his luggage.

When the Chevalier returns, he is astonished to see the Commander on his knees in front of the Baroness. As the suitors reappear, the Chevalier is about to challenge the Commander to another duel, but the Countess enters and offers her hand to the Chevalier. He refuses her and takes the Baroness's hand - he will marry her after he has killed the Commander!

The Countess finally admits that she had meant to offer her hand to the Commander. He accepts with pleasure, as his position on the estate will now be secure. The twelve suitors are disappointed - they had hoped that the Countess would never marry so that they could always live in hope. The Countess implies that they may still hope, so long as they continue to adore her. The Baroness and the Chevalier look forward to future happiness.

Note: the above synopsis is a précis of the one by Richard Langham-Smith in the booklet for the Opera Rara recording

== Recordings ==
Thomas: La cour de Célimène, Philharmonia Orchestra, Geoffrey Mitchell Choir

- Conductor: Andrew Litton
- Soloists: Laura Claycomb (La Comtesse), Joan Rodgers (La Baronne), Alastair Miles (Le Commandeur), Sébastien Droy (Le Chevalier), Nicole Tibbels (Bretonne)
- Recording date: July 2007
- Label: Opera Rara, ORC37 (2 CDs)
