= Raymond, ou Le secret de la reine =

Music

Raymond, ou Le Secret de la reine, is an opéra comique composed by Ambroise Thomas on a libretto by Joseph-Bernard Rosier and Adolphe de Leuven, premiered on 5 June 1851 at the Théâtre des Nouveaux. The overture remains popular as light music and transcribed for wind bands.

Overture to Raymond, by the U.S. Marine Band

The opera in three acts revisits the myth of the Man in the Iron Mask. Raymond, a young peasant in love with an orphan (Stelle), is recognized as the twin brother of Louis XIV and persecuted so as not to hinder his reign. At the end of the three acts, the hero and his beloved manage to flee thanks to the sacrifice of the Chevalier de Rosargues: brutal soldier, father of Stelle whose mother he raped and killed. He replaces Raymond behind his iron mask hoping for redemption.

If the work seems to have had a certain public success, it is difficult to assess today as the press of the time shows hostility to Raymond, considered unworthy of an academician.
