= The Scarlet Letter (Laitman opera) =

2008 opera by Lori Laitman

The Scarlet Letter is a 2008 opera by Lori Laitman to a libretto by David Mason based on the 1850 novel by Nathaniel Hawthorne. The opera was given a professional premiere in 2016 by Opera Colorado.

== Recordings ==
- Laitman: The Scarlet Letter - Laura Claycomb as Hester Prynne (soprano), Margaret Gawrysiak as Mistress Hibbons (mezzo-soprano), Dominic Armstrong as Arthur Dimmesdale; Kyle Erdos Knapp as John Wilson (tenors), Malcolm MacKenzie as Roger Chillingworth, and Daniel Belcher as Governor Bellingham (baritones) Opera Colorado Orchestra and Chorus, Ari Pelto Naxos Records 2017
