= Françoise de Rimini =

Opera by Ambroise Thomas

- Opera by Ambroise Thomas
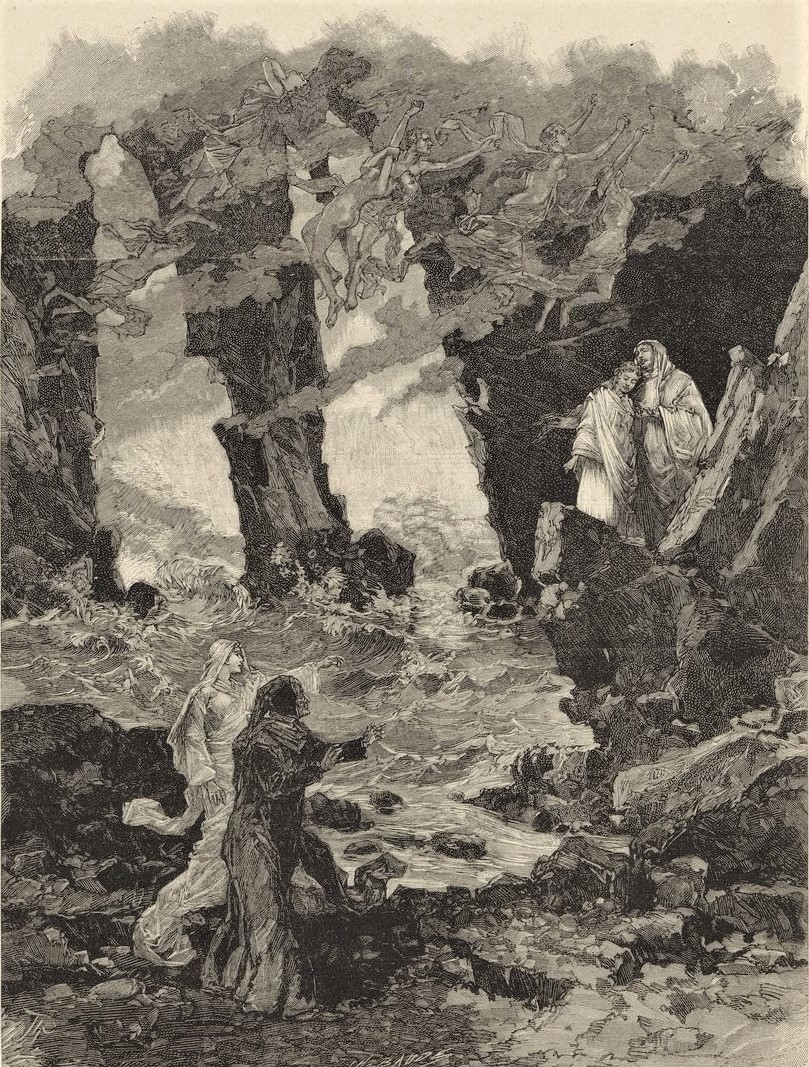
- Prologue scene from the premiere production where Virgil and Dante first encounter Francesca and her lover Paolo in Hell
- Librettist: Jules Barbier; Michel Carré
- Language: French
- Premiere: 14 April 1882; Palais Garnier, Paris

Françoise de Rimini (Francesca da Rimini) is an opera in four acts with a prologue and an epilogue. The last opera composed by Ambroise Thomas, it sets a French libretto by Michel Carré and Jules Barbier which is based on an episode from Dante's Divine Comedy. The opera was first performed by the Paris Opera on 14 April 1882 but fell into relative obscurity until its revival in 2011.

== Background and performance history ==
Françoise de Rimini was the last opera by Ambroise Thomas. Its French libretto was written by Michel Carré and Jules Barbier based on Dante's Divina commedia, where Francesca da Rimini is mentioned in the section Inferno.

The opera's world premiere at the Paris Opera was originally planned for 1880. It was to be a highlight of the first season of Auguste Vaucorbeil as director, who also planned to produce Gounod's Le tribut de Zamora. The first performance was finally staged by the Paris Opera on 14 April 1882 at the Palais Garnier. Some of the most notable singers of the time participated in a lavish stage setting by Jean-Baptiste Lavastre to honour the prestigious composer. It received a mixed reception, and despite the efforts of supporters it mostly disappeared from the repertory.

The opera was revived in Metz in 2011 at the Opéra-Théâtre de Metz Métropole to mark the bicentenary of the composer's birth. Catherine Hunold sang the title role and the Orchestre national de Lorraine was conducted by Jacques Mercier.

== Roles ==
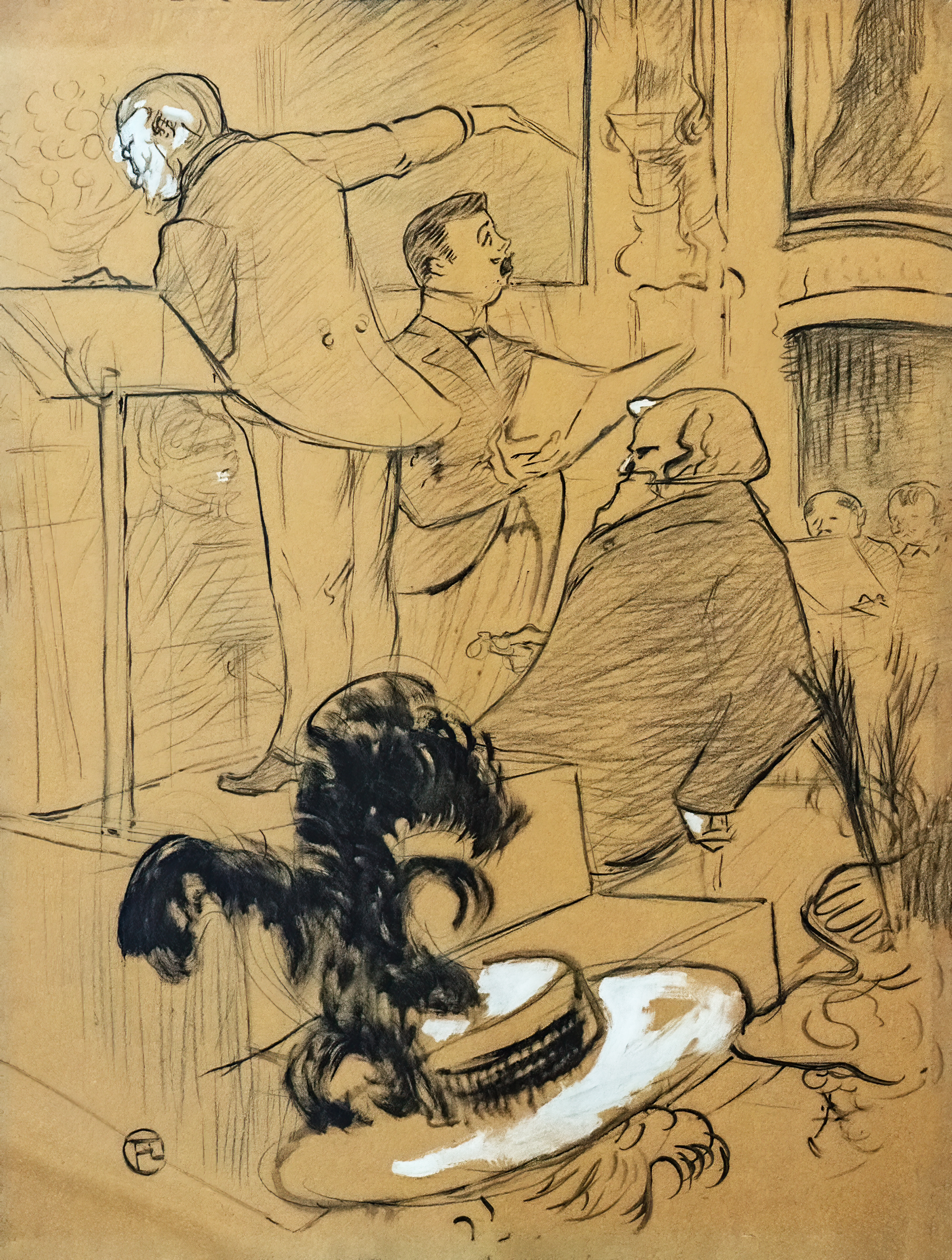
Thomas in a January 1896 by Toulouse-Lautrec which shows him seated behind the conductor listening to the rehearsal of a concert where the opera's Prologue was performed.

Roles, voice types, premiere cast
Role	Voice type	Premiere cast, 14 April 1882 Conductor: Ernest Eugène Altès
Paolo (Malatesta)	tenor	Henri Sellier
Ascanio, his page	mezzo-soprano	Renée Richard
Malatesta (Giancotto), Paolo's brother	baritone	Jean-Louis Lassalle
Francesca	soprano	Caroline Salla
Guido da Polenta, Francesca's father	bass	Pierre Gailhard
Beatrice	soprano	
Dante	bass	Alfred-Auguste Giraude
Virgile	contralto	Madeleine-Philippine Barbot
An officer	bass	Léon Melchissédec
Choir of angels

== Synopsis ==
The action takes place in Hell (prologue and epilogue) and in Rimini at the end of the 13th century.

In the prologue, Dante and Virgil meet the lovers Paolo and Françoise in Hell, and Virgil suggests that Dante tell their story. During the four acts, their passionate love unfolds against the background of the battles between the Guelphs and Ghibellines. In the epilogue, the lovers still sing their passionate duet in the presence of the poets. Finally a heavenly choir pardons them.

== Music ==
The work is partly still in the style French grand opera, namely the conclusions of the first and third act. The vocal writing shows influence from the Italian opera, while some audacious harmonies and dissonances are part of a more modern style. The duet of the lovers in the fourth act is similar to the duet in Wagner's Tristan und Isolde, in both structure and dramatic function.
