= Elizabeth Vidal =

French operatic coloratura soprano (born 1960)

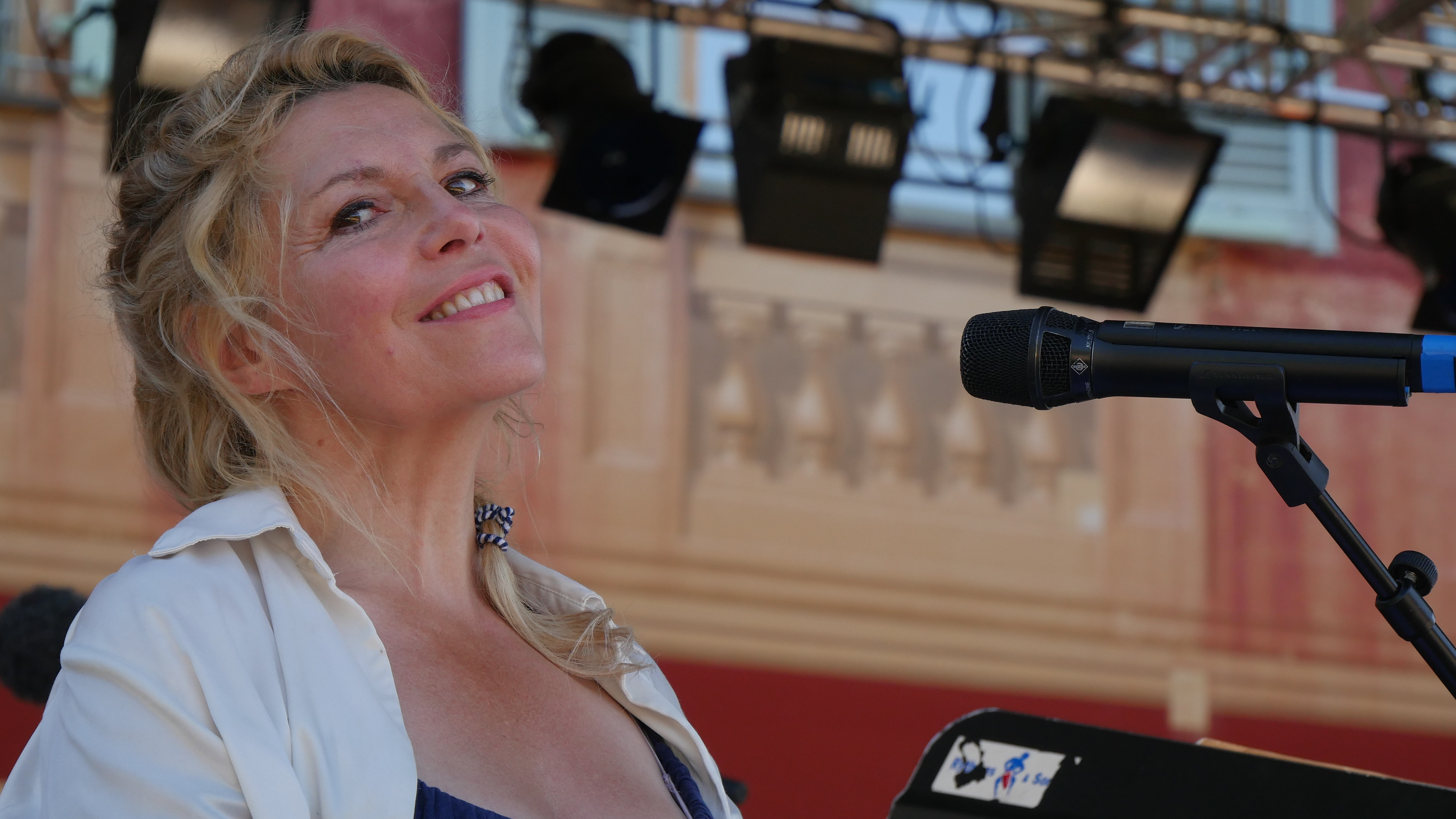
Elizabeth Vidal

Elizabeth Vidal (born 10 June 1960) is a French operatic coloratura soprano. Born in Nice to a Spanish father and a British mother, she was appointed teacher of singing at the Conservatory of Nice in 2009.

She appeared on the French show, On n'est pas couché on 19 April 2014 to present her CD album La Cantadora with classic/modern crossover music.

She was appointed Chevalier of the Ordre des Arts et des Lettres.

Vidal is the great-granddaughter of Thomas Jordan, who played cricket for France in the 1900 Summer Olympics.
