= Lori Laitman =

American composer (born 1955)

Lori Laitman (born 1955) is an American composer known primarily for vocal music. Her catalogue includes more than 400 songs and several operas.

== Early life and education ==
Laitman was born in Long Beach, New York, in 1955. She graduated magna cum laude from Yale College and received a Master of Music degree from the Yale School of Music. Laitman began studying composition at Yale during her sophomore year. A course in writing music for film and theater, taught by Frank Lewin, influenced her approach to setting texts decades later, when she set Sara Teasdale's The Metropolitan Tower for soprano Lauren Wagner in 1991.

== Career ==
Laitman's music focuses predominantly on the voice. She has composed songs, operas, and choral works, setting texts by classical and contemporary poets, including poets who died in the Holocaust. Her commissions have included works for the BBC, the Royal Philharmonic Society, Opera America, Opera Colorado, Seattle Opera, the Grant Park Music Festival, Music of Remembrance, and the Baltimore Symphony Orchestra. Her music has been performed at venues including Wigmore Hall, the Concertgebouw, the Kennedy Center, and Lincoln Center. Her work has also been featured through Thomas Hampson's Song of America project. In 2018, the Yale School of Music awarded Laitman the Ian Mininberg Alumni Award for Distinguished Service. In 2024, the American Academy of Teachers of Singing gave Laitman and composer Tom Cipullo an AATS Award in recognition of their mentorship and support of art-song composers. The Composer mentoring program they started is now under the banner of Cincinnati Song Initiative. Laitman's music was represented on the album American Composers at Play – William Bolcom, Ricky Ian Gordon, Lori Laitman, John Musto, which was nominated for Best Classical Solo Vocal Album at the 63rd Annual Grammy Awards.

=== Living in the Body ===
Living in the Body is a six-song cycle for soprano and saxophone setting poetry by Joyce Sutphen. A doctoral dissertation at Louisiana State University examines the cycle's commission, premiere, compositional process, musical structure, and performance considerations.

=== The Scarlet Letter ===
The Scarlet Letter is an opera by Laitman with a libretto by David Mason, adapted from Nathaniel Hawthorne's 1850 novel of the same name. The opera was commissioned by the University of Central Arkansas and received its world premiere there in 2008. Opera Colorado presented its professional premiere in May 2016. A recording of the opera was released by Naxos. The recording was named an Opera News Critic's Choice and was included among Fanfare magazine's top five CDs of 2018.

=== Vedem ===
Vedem is a Holocaust-themed oratorio by Laitman with a libretto by David Mason. It received its world premiere on May 10, 2010, at Benaroya Hall in Seattle as part of a Music of Remembrance Holocaust Memorial Day concert. The work concerns the boys of Terezín and their clandestine magazine Vedem. Mason's libretto incorporates six poems originally published in the magazine. Laitman's Holocaust-related vocal music has also been the subject of academic research. A 2024 doctoral project at the University of Illinois examined Vedem songs and In Sleep the World Is Yours in detail.

=== The Three Feathers ===
The Three Feathers is a one-act children's opera by Laitman with a libretto by Dana Gioia, based on a Brothers Grimm fairy tale. It was commissioned by the Center for the Arts at Virginia Tech and received its world premiere at the Moss Arts Center in Blacksburg, Virginia, in October 2014. Subsequent performances include Opera Steamboat in August 2022 and Solo Opera in September 2023 at the Lesher Center in Walnut Creek, California.

=== Uncovered ===
Uncovered is a one-act chamber opera by Laitman with a libretto by Leah Lax, based on Lax's memoir Uncovered: How I Left Hasidic Life and Finally Came Home. The opera was commissioned by Utah State University, City Lyric Opera of New York, and the New York Opera Society. It premiered in March 2022 at the Caine Lyric Theatre in Logan, Utah, and received its New York premiere in November 2022 with City Lyric Opera.

=== Maya and the Magic Ring ===
Maya and the Magic Ring is a family opera by Laitman with a libretto by Dana Gioia. Lyric Opera of Kansas City commissioned it, and it premiered in March 2025 at the Midwest Trust Center in Overland Park, Kansas. Subsequent performances have included Lyric Opera of Orange County's May 2026 production, which was recorded for release.

=== Unsung ===
Unsung is an orchestral work commissioned by the Baltimore Symphony Orchestra as one of its centennial commissions. It received its world premiere in September 2016 at Strathmore in North Bethesda, Maryland, conducted by Marin Alsop.

=== Are Women People? ===
Are Women People? is a cycle of eight songs for vocal quartet and piano four hands by Laitman, commissioned by The Hanson Institute for American Music at The Eastman School of Music and the Susan B Anthony Center for Women’s Leadership. Its texts include writings associated with the women's suffrage movement, settings of Alice Duer Miller, Susan B. Anthony and the text of the Nineteenth Amendment. The work premiered March 15, 2017 at Kilbourn Hall at The Eastman School of Music in Rochester, New York, and received its Chicago premiere in 2019. The Chicago Classical Review described the cycle as essentially tonal and lyrical, with off-center harmonies and syncopated rhythms.

=== The Imaginary Photo Album ===
The Imaginary Photo Album was commissioned jointly by the Royal Philharmonic Society and BBC Radio 3 for soprano Katharina Konradi, one of the BBC New Generation Artists. The work premiered with Konradi and pianist Joseph Middleton at Wigmore Hall on October 25, 2020.

=== Films ===
In 2022, Laitman began making films of her art songs in conjunction with Positive Note Films in the United Kingdom. The first, Sarong Song, is a hybrid presentation of classical song, poetry, and original art, to illustrations by Ian Archie Beck, and can be found on YouTube. It was selected by the Swedish International Film Festival and the Montreal Independent Film Festival, Yale in Hollywood Film Festival, American Golden Picture International Film Festival, won for best composer at the Mindfield Film Festival in Albuquerque, and was a finalist in the 4theatre.com Film Festival.

The second film, The Apple Orchard, was released in March 2024 and won Best Musical Score, Short Film in the 2025 Berlin Kiez Film Festival, Best Original Score in the Washington DC International Cinema Festival, received a Silver Medal in Composition at the Global Music Awards, won for Best Song at the Cannes World Film Festival for Best Song, won Honorable Mention at the Mindfield Film Festival in Albuquerque, won the Silver Medal for Best Score at the Mindfield Film Festival in Los Angeles, was nominated for Best Original Music in the Swedish International Film Festival and was a Semi-Finalist for Best Score at the Los Angeles Film Awards.

== Critical reviews ==
Fanfare Magazine described Laitman as "one of the most talented and intriguing of living composers."

Gramophone wrote about The Scarlet Letter: "The first thing that leaps into one's ears is the sheer beauty of the music. Laitman has devoted much of her career to the art song, and her ability to meld words with lyrical, often soaring lines is on abundant display in her opera."

The Journal of Singing wrote "It is difficult to think of anyone before the public today who equals her exceptional gifts for embracing a poetic text and giving it new and deeper life through music."
