= Joseph-Bernard Rosier =

French playwright (1804–1880)

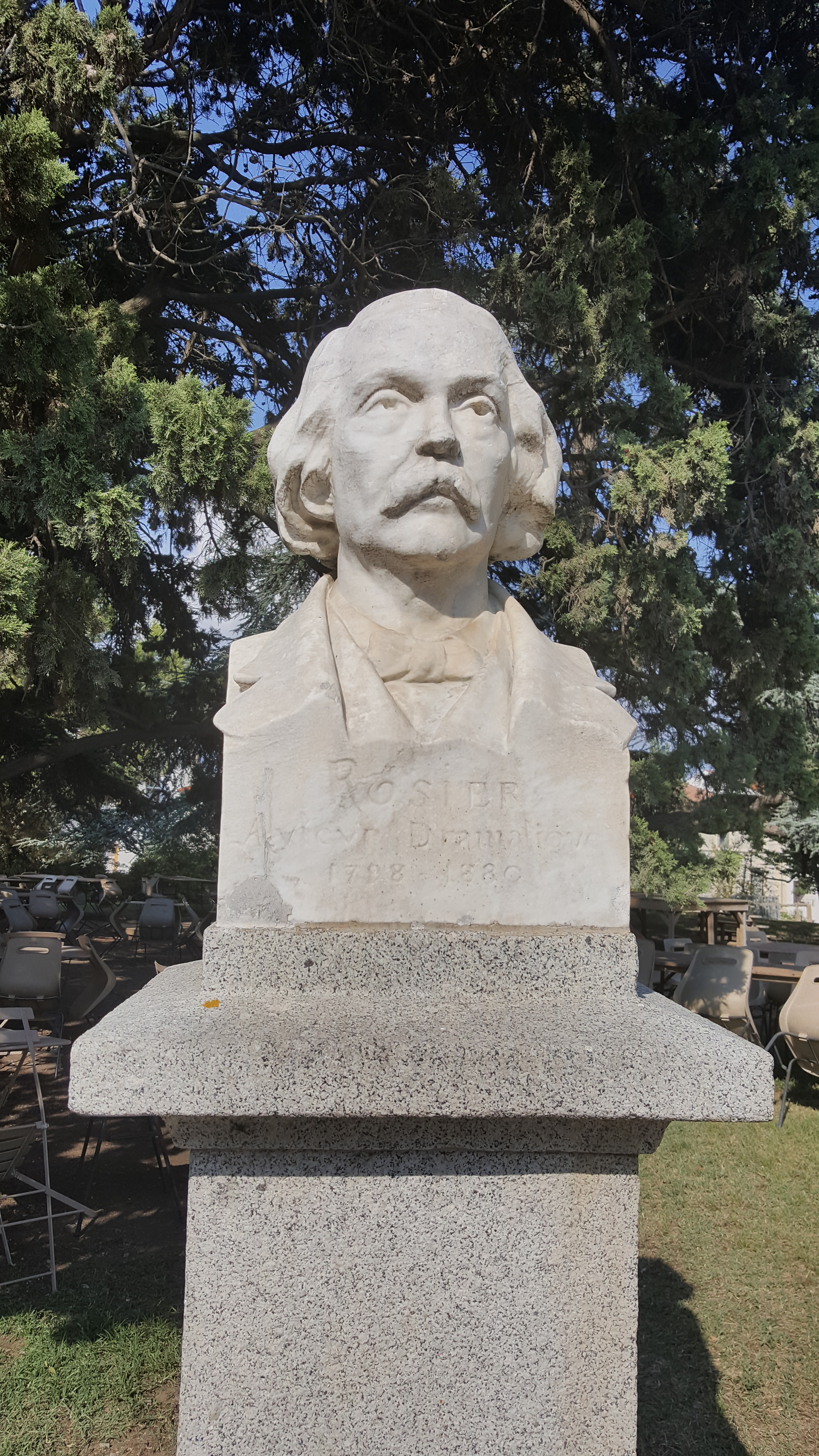
- Injalbert – Joseph Rosier – Plateau des Poètes
- Born: 18 October 1804; Béziers, France
- Died: 12 October 1880 (aged 75); Marseille, France
- Occupations: Playwright, librettist
- Years active: 1830 – 1856

Joseph-Bernard Rosier (18 October 1804 – 12 October 1880) was a 19th-century French playwright and librettist.

== Biography ==
He first worked as a solicitor's clerk before becoming a professor of rhetoric and embarking on a literary career in 1830.

His plays were presented on the most significant Parisian stages of the 19th century, including those of the Théâtre du Vaudeville, the Théâtre des Variétés, the Théâtre de la Porte Saint-Martin, and the Théâtre-Français.

== Works ==
- 1830: Le Mendiant Cratès, ou le Rêve et le réveil
- 1830: Le mari de ma femme, comedy in three acts
- 1831: Le Mariage par dévouement, comedy in three acts, in verses
- 1833: La Mort de Figaro, drama in five acts, in prose
- 1834: Charles IX, drama in five acts
- 1834: La jolie voyageuse ou Les deux Giroux, anecdote contemporaine in one act, with Achille d'Artois and René de Chazet
- 1836: Un procès criminel, ou les Femmes impressionnables, comedy in three acts
- 1836: Vieilles et nouvelles histoires
- 1837: Maria Padilla, Spanish chronicle in three acts, one prologue and one epilogue
- 1837: Claire, ou la Préférence d'une mère, drama in three acts, in prose
- 1838: Les assurances conjugales, comedy in one act, mingled with chant
- 1838: A trente ans ou Une femme raisonnable, comedy in three acts mingled with couplets, with Alexandre Pierre Joseph Doche
- 1839: L'Amour, comedy in three acts
- 1839: La Lune rousse, comedy in one act, mingled with songs
- 1839: Le protégé, comedy in one act
- 1839: Le manoir de Montlouvier, drama in five acts
- 1840: La Femme de mon mari, comedy in two acts, mingled with couplets
- 1840: La mansarde du crime, comedy in one act
- 1841: Zacharie, drama in five acts
- 1841: Langeli, comedy in one act, mingled with couplets
- 1841: Manche à manche, comedy in one act, mingled with song
- 1842: Les deux brigadiers, vaudeville in two acts
- 1842: Monsieur de Maugaillard, ou le Premier jour des noces, comedy in one act in prose
- 1846: L'Inconsolable ou Les Deux déménagements, comédie-vaudeville in three acts
- 1847: Un mousquetaire-gris, comedy mingled with couplets in two acts
- 1848: Le pouvoir d'une femme, comedy in two acts
- 1848: La Dernière conquête, comedy mingled with song, in two acts
- 1849: Brutus, lâche César!, comedy in one act mingled with song
- 1849: La Pension alimentaire, comédie-vaudeville in two acts
- 1849: Croque poule, comédie-vaudeville in one act
- 1850: Un mariage en trois étapes, comedy mingled with song, in three acts
- 1850: Le songe d'une nuit d'été, opéra comique in three acts, with Ambroise Thomas and Adolphe de Leuven
- 1851: Deux lions râpés, comédie-vaudeville in three tableaux, with Charles Varin
- 1851: Raymond, ou Le secret de la reine, opéra comique in three acts, with Ambroise Thomas and Adolphe de Leuven
- 1851: Une passion du midi, vaudeville in one act
- 1852: Un mari trop aimé, comédie-vaudeville in one act
- 1853: La foi, l'espérance et la charité, drama in five acts and six parts
- 1855: La Cour de Célimène, opéra comique in two acts, with Ambroise Thomas
- 1855: Le Housard de Berchini, opéra comique in two acts, with Adolphe Adam
- 1856: Chacun pour soi, comedy in three acts
- undated: Un bon ouvrier, comédie-vaudeville, with Achille d'Artois

== Bibliography ==
- Louis Gustave Vapereau, Dictionnaire universel des contemporains, 1880, p. 1573
- Tadeusz Kowzan, Théâtre miroir: métathéâtre de l'antiquité au XXIe siècle, 2006, p. 245
- Charles Dudley Warner, A Library of the World's Best Literature, 2008, p. 467

== See also ==
- List of French people
- List of playwrights
