= Adolphe de Leuven =

French theatre director and librettist

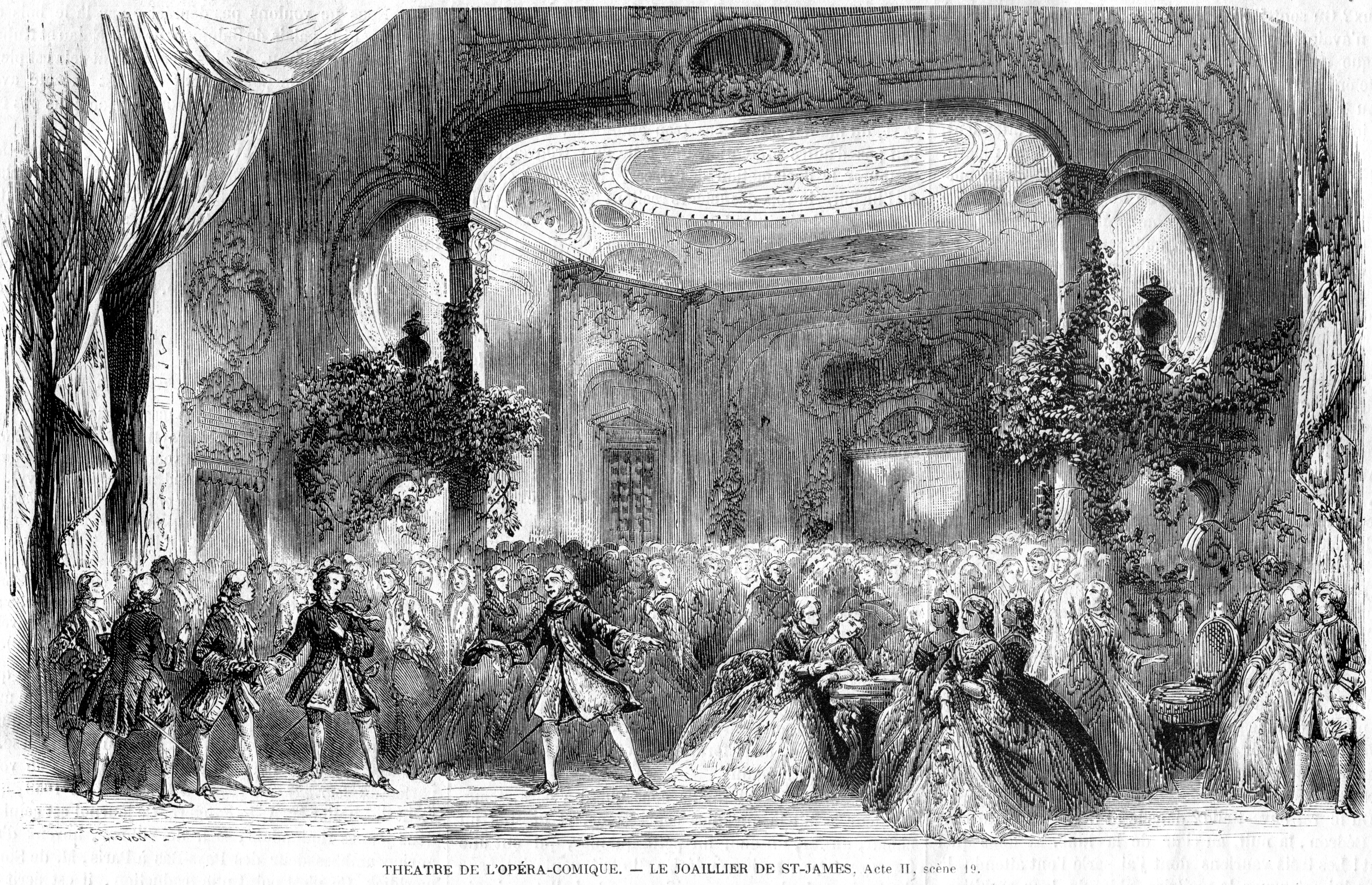
- Le Joaillier de Saint-James at the l'Opéra-Comique, L'Illustration, 17 February 1862
- Born: 29 September 1802; Paris, France
- Died: 14 April 1884 (aged 81); Marly-le-Roi, France
- Occupations: Librettist, writer, dramatist

Adolphe de Leuven (29 September 1802 – 14 April 1884) was a French theatre director and a librettist. Also known as Grenvallet, and Count Adolph Ribbing.

He was the illegitimate son of Adolph Ribbing, who was involved in the assassination of Gustav III of Sweden in 1792, and Jeanne-Claude Billard. He took his name as a variation of that of his paternal grandmother, Eva Löwen.

He produced over 170 plays and librettos, with operatic settings by Adam including Le postillon de Lonjumeau, Clapisson, Félicien David (Le Saphir) and Ambroise Thomas (Raymond, ou Le secret de la reine).

He was associated with the Opéra-Comique for fifty years and was director (with Eugène Ritt as administrator) from 1862 to 1870 and co-director with Camille du Locle from 1870-1874. He resigned in protest at the on-stage murder in Carmen.
