= Ambroise Thomas =

French composer and music educator (1811-1896)

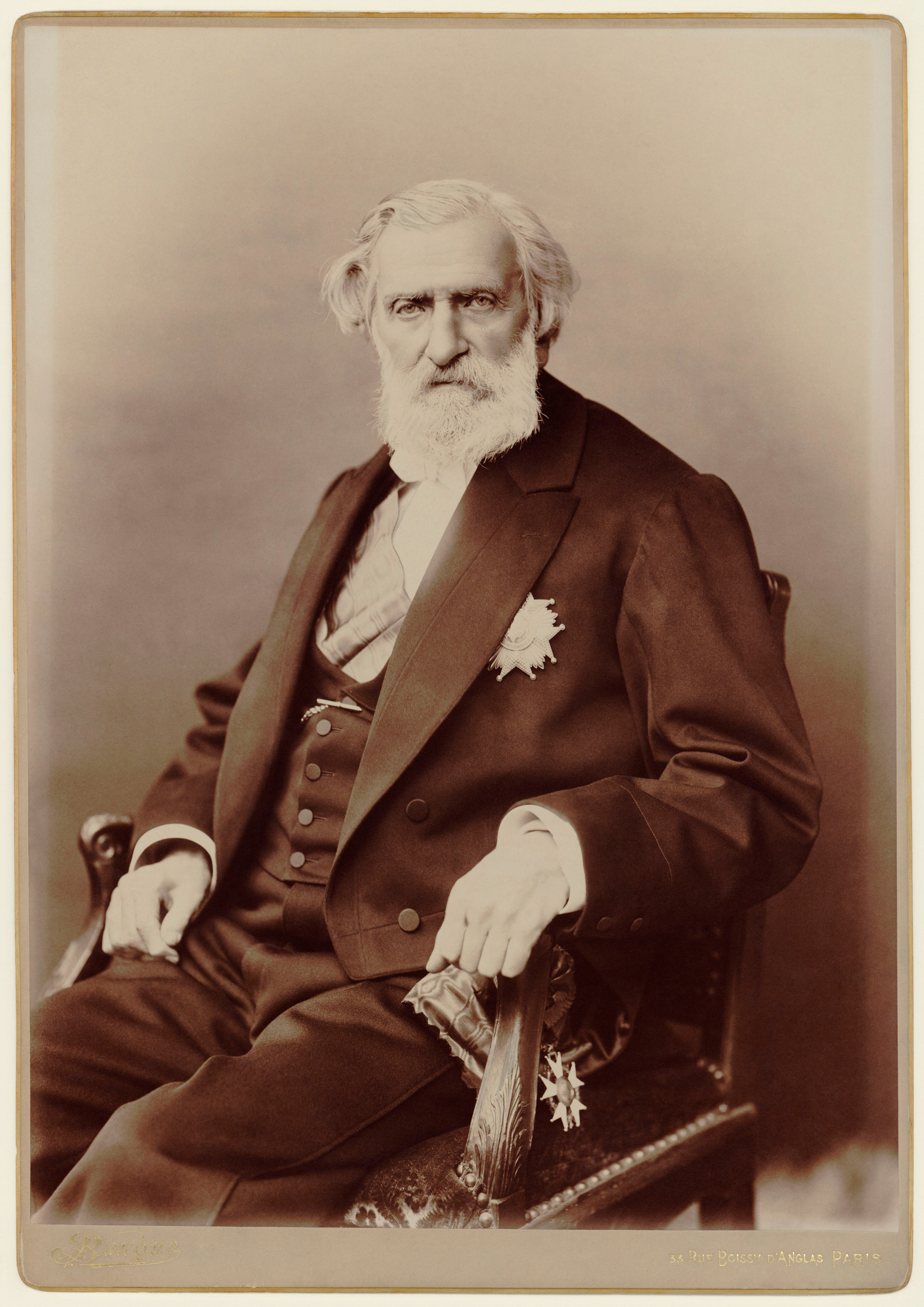
Thomas by Wilhelm Benque, c. 1895

Charles Louis Ambroise Thomas (French: [ɑ̃bʁwaz tɔmɑ]; 5 August 1811 – 12 February 1896) was a French composer and teacher, best known for his operas Mignon (1866) and Hamlet (1868).

Born into a musical family, Thomas was a student at the Conservatoire de Paris, winning France's top music prize, the Prix de Rome. He pursued a career as a composer of operas, completing his first opera, La double échelle, in 1837. He wrote twenty further operas over the next decades, mostly comic, but he also treated more serious subjects, finding considerable success with audiences in France and abroad.

Thomas was appointed as a professor at the Conservatoire in 1856, and in 1871 he succeeded Daniel Auber as director. Between then and his death at his home in Paris twenty-five years later, he modernised the Conservatoire's organisation while imposing a rigidly conservative curriculum, hostile to modern music, and attempting to prevent composers such as César Franck and Gabriel Fauré from influencing the students of the Conservatoire.

Thomas' operas were generally neglected during most of the 20th century, but in more recent decades they have experienced something of a revival both in Europe and the US.

== Life and career ==
=== Early years ===
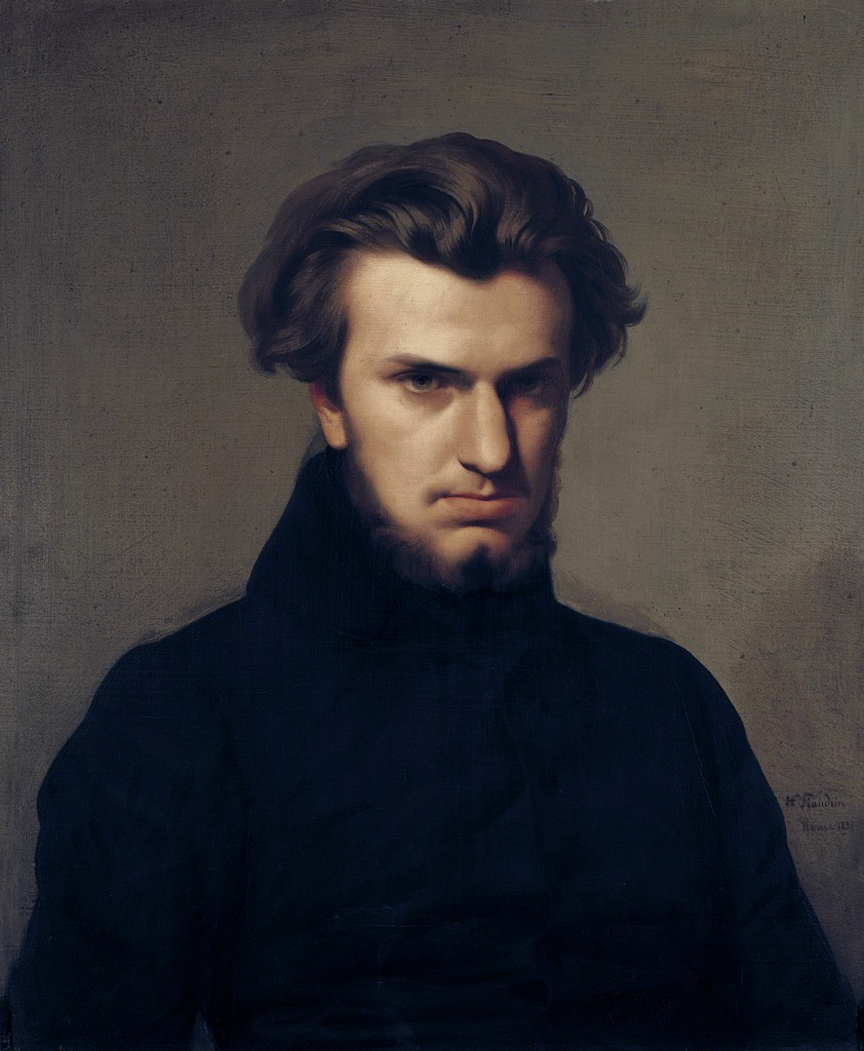
Thomas in 1834 by Jean-Hippolyte Flandrin

Thomas was born in Metz, the youngest of four children of Martin Thomas (1770–1823) and his wife, Jeanne, née Willaume (1780–1866), both music teachers. By the age of ten he was already an experienced pianist and violinist. When he was twelve his father died, and Ambroise's elder brother Charles moved to Paris, where he played the cello in the Opéra orchestra. In 1828, aged 17, Ambroise joined him in Paris, where he was admitted as a student by the Conservatoire de Paris. He studied the piano with Pierre Zimmerman and harmony and counterpoint with Victor Dourlen. He won premiers prix in these subjects in 1829 and 1830. He went on to study the piano with Friedrich Kalkbrenner, and composition with Jean-François Lesueur and Auguste Barbereau.

In 1832, at his second attempt, Thomas won France's premier music prize, the Grand Prix de Rome, with his cantata Hermann et Ketty. The prize brought him three years' study at the Villa Medici, the French Academy in Rome. During his time there he became friendly with the painter Ingres, the head of the academy, with whom he shared an admiration for both Mozart and Beethoven; he also met Berlioz, who encouraged him and wrote about him favourably. During his Italian sojourn he wrote chamber music – a piano trio, a string quintet and a string quartet – and a set of six songs, Souvenirs d'Italie. After leaving Rome, Thomas stayed briefly in Germany, before returning to Paris in 1835, when he began writing for the stage.

=== Composing career ===
Le caïd, 1849

The first opera Thomas composed was La double échelle (The Double Ladder, 1837), a one-act comedy, praised by Berlioz for its "extreme vivacity and wit". It was produced at the Opéra-Comique, received 247 performances, and in the next few years was given in Brussels, New Orleans, Berlin, Vienna and London. His first full-length opera, Le perruquier de la Régence (The Regency Wigmaker, 1838) was followed in the next decade by six more, none of which made any permanent impression. During this period he also composed a ballet (La Gipsy, 1839). His first completely successful three-act opera was Le caïd (The Qaid, 1849), described by the musicologist Elizabeth Forbes as "a mixture of Il barbiere di Siviglia and L'italiana in Algeri"; it remained in the French operatic repertoire throughout the nineteenth century, and achieved more than four hundred performances over the next fifty years.

Thomas' next work for the Opéra-Comique, Le songe d'une nuit d'été (The Summer Night's Dream, 1850), was also a popular success. The text, by Joseph-Bernard Rosier and Adolphe de Leuven, owes nothing to A Midsummer Night's Dream: Shakespeare appears as one of the characters, along with Queen Elizabeth I and Shakespeare's Falstaff, the governor of "Richemont", where the action takes place. The premiere in Paris was followed by productions in many European and American theatres. The work, described by The Musical Times as "a little masterpiece", was frequently revived, but fell out of the repertory after the composer's death. (Note: A rare modern revival was staged by the director Pierre Jourdan at the Théâtre Impérial de Compiègne in 1994.) Later in 1850 Thomas' next opera, Raymond, was premiered. It has not survived in the operatic repertoire, but the overture became a popular orchestral showpiece. In 1851, following the death of the composer Gaspare Spontini, Thomas was elected to succeed him as a member of the Académie des Beaux Arts. (Note: Like many other composers, Thomas made several attempts to secure election to the Académie (also known as the "Institut"). This successful application was his third attempt. Berlioz, another candidate to succeed Spontini, had to wait another five years before being elected.)

=== Professor ===
In 1856 Thomas was appointed professor of composition at the Conservatoire, under the directorship of Daniel Auber. He remained on the staff, as professor and subsequently director, until his death forty years later. Over these years his students included the composers Jules Massenet, Gaston Serpette, and, late in Thomas' career, George Enescu; future academics included Théodore Dubois and Charles Lenepveu; and conductors who were Thomas' students included Edouard Colonne and Désiré-Émile Inghelbrecht. (Note: Other Thomas students mentioned in Grove's Dictionary of Music and Musicians are Louis-Albert Bourgault-Ducoudray; Charles-Alexis Chauvet; Louis Diémer; Octave Fouque(fr); Albert Lavignac; Charles-Édouard Lefebvre; Isidore-Edouard Legouix; Izydor Lotto(de); Olivier Métra; and Johan Peter Selmer(de). Among Thomas' other pupils were the pianist and teacher Raoul Pugno. the pianist and composer Francis Thomé, and the zarzuela composer and conductor Gerónimo Giménez.)

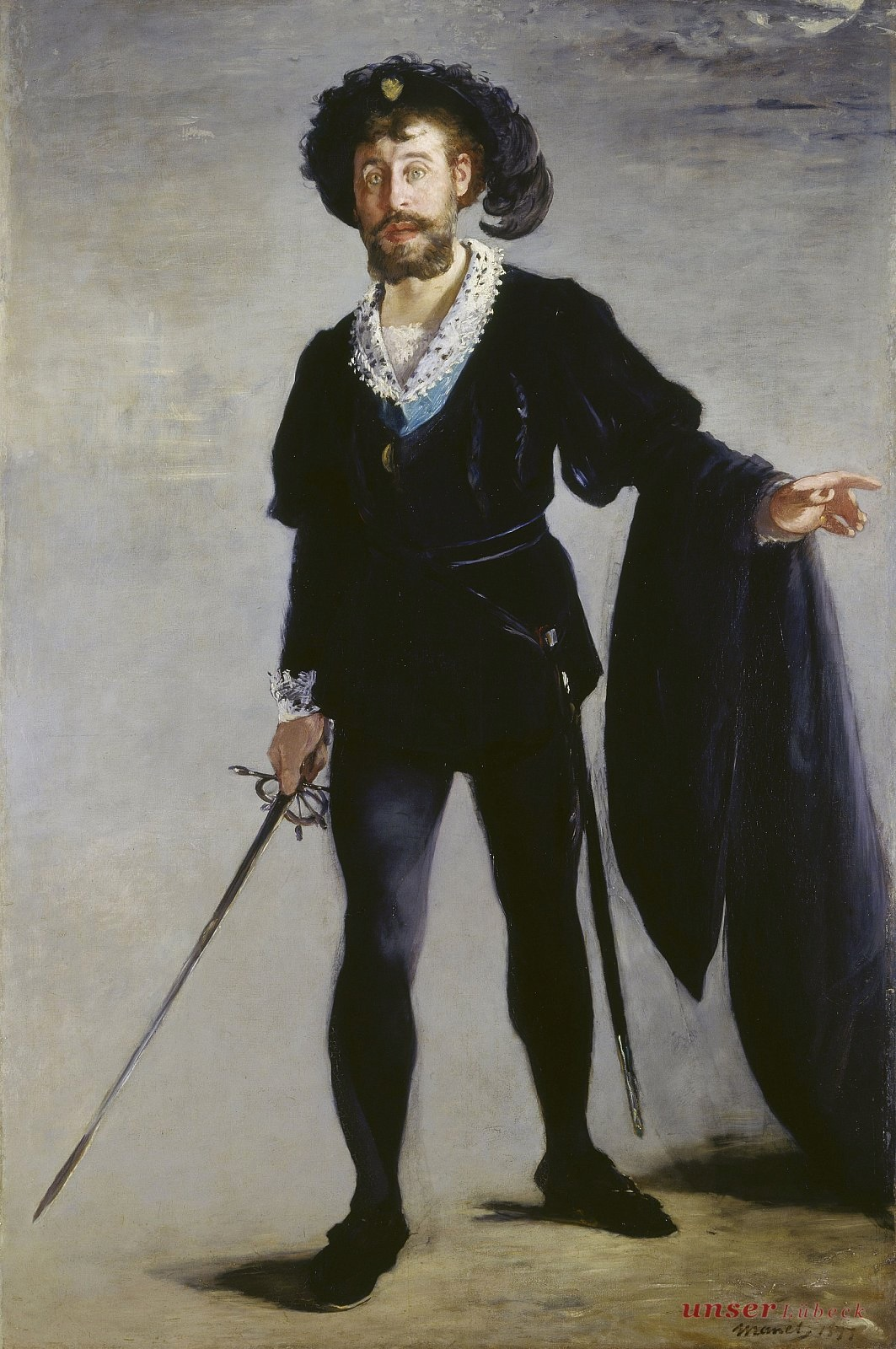
Jean-Baptiste Faure as Hamlet, painted by Manet

During the 1850s Thomas continued to compose, writing five operas, none of which made much impression. After a fallow spell in the early 1860s he wrote Mignon, the work by which his name became most widely known. The libretto was by Jules Barbier and Michel Carré, based on Goethe's novel Wilhelm Meisters Lehrjahre. Forbes writes that, unusually, Thomas had the advantage of a well-judged and theatrically effective libretto, and that although in the novel Mignon dies, the happy ending works well in the opera. (A happy ending was then compulsory at the Opéra-Comique: it was another nine years before Carmen defied the convention there, ending with the death of the main character.) The strong original cast featured, in the title role, Célestine Galli-Marié, a celebrated singer who later created the part of Carmen in Bizet's opera.

Thomas was similarly fortunate in his cast for his next success, Hamlet (1868), which starred Jean-Baptiste Faure as Hamlet and Christine Nilsson as Ophelia. The opera was distantly based on Shakespeare by way of a French adaptation by Alexandre Dumas, père, and Paul Meurice, further adapted as a libretto by Carré and Barbier. Although the adaptation was seen as a travesty of the play, with a ballet-divertissement (obligatory at the Opéra) and a happy ending, with Hamlet acclaimed as king, the work was successful not only in Paris but in London. Despite disparaging reviews of the libretto from English-speaking critics at the time and subsequently, (Note: Reviewing the first British performance, the music critic of The Morning Post wrote, "The little there is of Hamlet in the opera has not been understood by the composer of the music or the author of the libretto". After later performances at Covent Garden, the text was condemned by The Observer ("an absurd travesty of the great original"), The Pall Mall Gazette ("No one but a barbarian or a Frenchman would have dared to make such a lamentable burlesque of so tragic a theme") and Sir Thomas Beecham ("a perfectly abominable French travesty of Hamlet" – this despite Beecham's inclusion of the piece in his 1910 season at Covent Garden.)) the work has remained an occasional part of the operatic repertoire; later singers of Ophelia included Emma Calvé, Emma Albani, Nellie Melba and Mary Garden, and among the Hamlets have been Victor Maurel, Titta Ruffo, Mattia Battistini and more recently Sherrill Milnes, Thomas Allen and Thomas Hampson. Although Thomas had by now a reputation for musical conservatism, the score of Hamlet was innovative in one respect: its incorporation of saxophones into the instrumentation.

Later in Thomas' life his academic career largely overtook his activities as a composer, and after Hamlet, he composed only one more opera: Françoise de Rimini (1882), which was well received but did not enter the regular operatic repertoire.

=== Later years ===
Overture to Raymond
Played in 1993 by the United States Marine Band (8:43)

On the outbreak of the Franco-Prussian War in 1870 Thomas, though aged nearly sixty, volunteered to serve in the Garde Nationale. The following year Auber resigned as director of the Conservatoire, shortly before his death, and Thomas was appointed his successor. (Note: Auber was briefly succeeded as director by Francisco Salvador-Daniel – appointed by the Communards and shot by the French government eleven days later – before Thomas was appointed.) He was so widely seen as Auber's heir apparent that the minister of education, Jules Simon, said in his letter offering Thomas the post, "You are so obviously fitted for the office that if I did not nominate you I should seem to be signing your dismissal from a post already yours." (Note: It is unclear whether Simon knew that the French President, Adolphe Thiers, had sounded Charles Gounod out about succeeding Auber.) As director Thomas ran an intransigently conservative regime. The music of Auber, Halévy and especially Meyerbeer was regarded as the correct model for students, and early French music such as that of Rameau and modern music, including that of Wagner were kept rigorously out of the curriculum. Thomas strove to keep progressive musicians from being appointed to the faculty of the Conservatoire – unsuccessfully in the case of César Franck, who was appointed against Thomas' wishes in 1872, but successfully as regards Gabriel Fauré whose appointment to the Conservatoire was delayed until after Thomas' death.

Thomas was, on the other hand, innovative in the running of the Conservatoire: he increased the number of classes, improved the conditions of the faculty, and expanded the curriculum to include solfège, sight-reading and compulsory orchestral practice. The faculty under Thomas included, at various times the composers Franck, Théodore Dubois, Jules Massenet and Ernest Guiraud, and the singers Pauline Viardot and Romain Bussine.

In 1889 the Opéra staged Thomas' ballet La tempête (another treatment of a Shakespeare play – The Tempest), but it made little impression. In 1894, after the 1,000th performance of Mignon at the Opéra-Comique, the octogenarian composer was embraced on the stage by Verdi, his junior by two years, before President Carnot decorated Thomas with the ribbon of the Grand-Croix de la Légion d'honneur.

Thomas died in his flat in the Conservatoire in 1896, aged 84, of congestion of the lungs. He was survived by his widow, Elvire, née Remaury (1827–1910), whom he married in 1878. He was succeeded as director of the Conservatoire by Dubois.

== Music ==
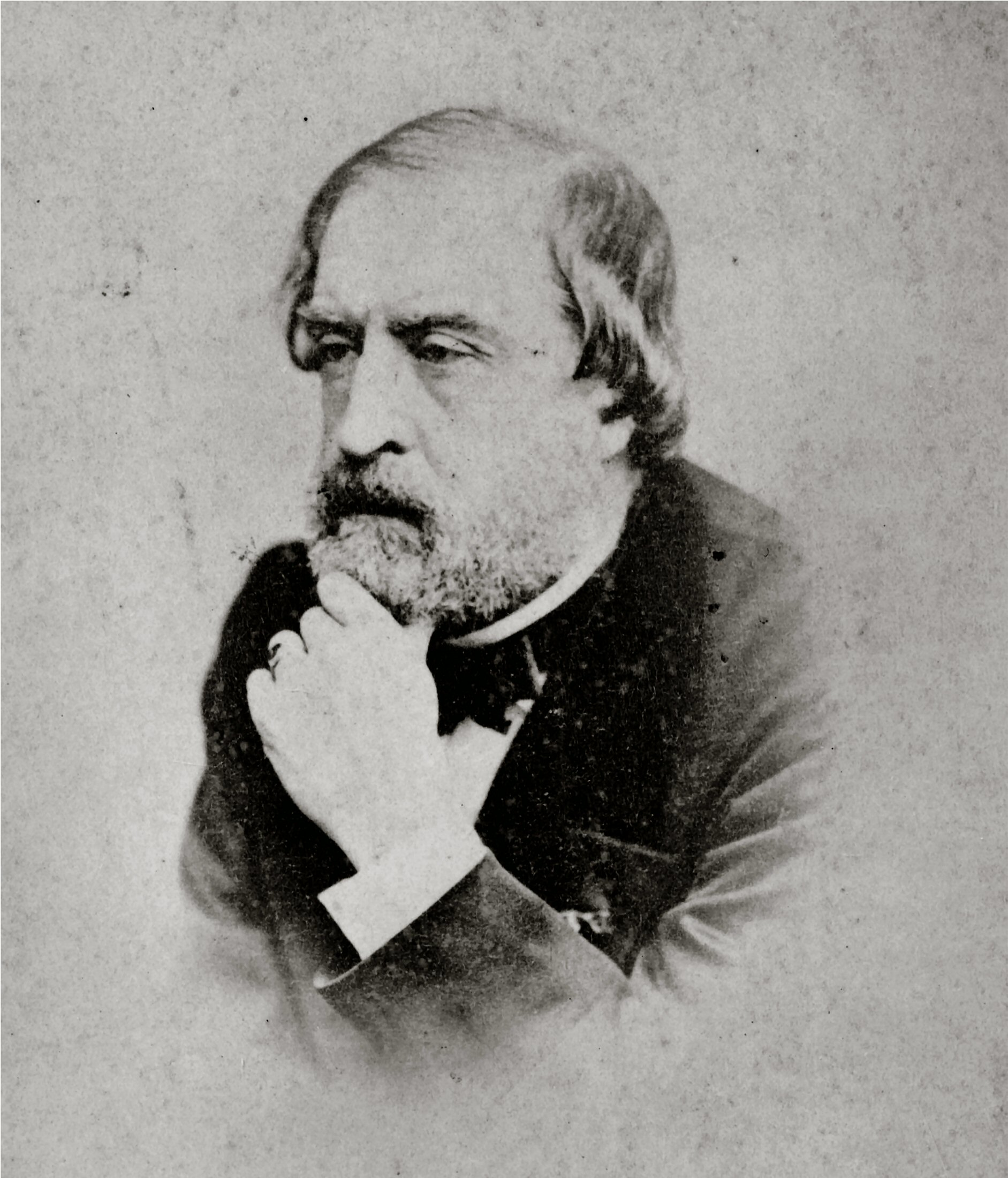
Thomas, about 1865

Emmanuel Chabrier's jibe, "There is good music, there is bad music, and then there is Ambroise Thomas" is often quoted, but, as the musicologist Richard Langham Smith observes, it is not clear whether Chabrier meant that Thomas' music was worse than bad, somewhere between good and bad, or something else. A contemporary assessment was given in the first edition of Grove's Dictionary of Music and Musicians (1889), where Gustave Chouquet wrote of Thomas:

He brings to his task an inborn instinct for the stage, and a remarkable gift of interpreting dramatic situations of the most varied and opposite kinds. His skill in handling the orchestra is consummate, both in grouping instruments of different timbre, and obtaining new effects of sound; but though carrying orchestral colouring to the utmost pitch of perfection, he never allows it to overpower the voices. With a little more boldness and individuality of melody this accomplished writer, artist, and poet – master of all moods and passing in turn from melancholy musings to the liveliest banter – would rank with the leaders of the modern school of composers; as it is, the purity and diversity of his style make him a first-rate dramatic composer.

In the 2001 edition of Grove, Langham Smith writes, "In the context of French opera of the late 19th century Thomas was a figure of considerable importance, an imaginative innovator and a master of musical characterization." Langham Smith concludes that after years of neglect, Thomas' work saw a considerable revival, beginning in the late 20th century, with major productions of Mignon and Hamlet in France, Britain and the US.

Forbes writes that Thomas was an eclectic composer able to write in a wide variety of styles. She identifies Hérold and Auber as influences on his early works, and considers Le caïd the first of his works to show true originality, though nonetheless clearly showing the influence of Rossini. In later works, Thomas' music could still be derivative: Forbes cites Psyché (1857) as "an inferior copy of Gounod's Sapho" and his Le carnaval de Venise (also 1857) as imitating Victor Massé. She concludes that at his best – which he was not always – Thomas wrote delightful and individual music, was capable of orchestration that is "often quite ravishing", and musically conveyed the character of the important roles strongly and clearly. "If Thomas had written no stage works except Mignon and Hamlet he would probably be more widely recognized as one of the most influential and important of French 19th-century operatic composers."

== List of compositions ==
=== Operas ===
See: List of operas by Ambroise Thomas.

=== Non-operatic vocal: secular ===
- "Hermann et Ketty", cantata, 1832
- "Silvio Pellico", 1831, lost
- "Nel iginia d'Asti", scena e aria, 1834
- "Nel Foscarini", 2 voices, orchestra, 1834
- "Duos Italiens-Téresa", 2 voices, orchestra, 1834
- "Storia di Colombo", scena e duetto, voices, orchestra, 1834
- "Maria e Leicester", 2 voices, piano, 1834
- "Della Pia", scena e romanza, 1834
- "La charité du couvent", cantata, 1843
- "Hommage à Lesueur", cantata, 1852
- "Hommage à Boieldieu", cantata, 1875
- "Via", via!", canzone veneziano, 4 voices, piano, undated
- "Scènes chorales" for mixed voices, 1853
- "L'harmonie des peuples", c. 1855
- "Choeur des gardes-chasses, c. 1857
- "Le chant des amis", 1858
- "Salut aux chanteurs de la France" 1859
- "France", 1860
- "Le forgeron", 1861
- "Le Tyrol", 1862
- "Les archers de Bouvines", 1863
- "Les traîneaux", 1864
- "Le carnaval de Rome", 1864
- "Le temple de la paix", 1867
- "Paris!", Vaudin", 1867
- "La nuit du sabbat", 1869
- "L'Atlantique", undated
- "Chant patriotique

=== Non-operatic vocal: sacred ===
- "Messe de Requiem", chorus, orchestra, 1833
- "Ave verum", after Mozart, arr. Thomas, c. 1835
- "O salutaris", motet, SAA, organ, 1836
- "Sub tuum praesidium", motet, SSA, organ, 1836
- "Veni sponsa Christi", motet, TTBB, organ, 1836
- "Messe solennelle", solo voices, chorus, orchestra, 1852
- "Pie Jesu", tenor, organ, 1864, 1896
- "Beati mortui", voice, organ
- "Agnus Dei", 3 voices, organ, c. 1895
- "Messe de l'Orphéon", TTBB, undated, Credo only; collaboration with Adolphe Adam and Fromental Halévy
- "Ave Maria", SAT, organ, undated
- "Agnus Dei", 3 voices, org

=== Songs ===
solo voice and piano, except where otherwise stated

- "Souvenirs d'Italie": 6 romances italiennes et venitiennes, 1835
- "Adieu les beaux jours", c. 1835
- "Doux abri", c. 1835
- "La Patrie", c. 1835
- "Romance sur les paroles anglaises", c. 1835
- "Romance sur les paroles allemandes", c. 1835
- "C'est vous", 1840
- "La vierge Marie", c. 1840
- "Viens", c. 1840
- "Ah sur ma parole", 1842
- "La charité du couvent", 1843
- "Belle folle espagnole", 1844
- "Ange et mortel", c. 1855
- "Sérénade", c. 1861
- "Le petit chou", c. 1861
- "Ah sur ma parole", c. 1862
- "Le soir", 1869
- "Le berger de la Reuss", c. 1870
- "Fleur de neige", 1880
- "Croyance", 2 voices", 1885
- "Passiflore", 1887
- "Chanson de Margyane", 1896
- "Baissez les yeux", 1897
- "Souvenir", 1900
- "L'amiable printemps", 1900
- "Ainsi va le monde", 1903
- "Belle, ayez pitie", undated
- "C'est le bonheur", undated
- "La folle d'Yarmouth", undated
- "L'aimable printemps", undated

=== Orchestral ===
- "Overture, 1832, lost
- "Fantaisie brillante, piano, orchestra/string quartet, undated, arranged for piano, c. 1836
- "Marche religieuse", 1865
- "Chant du psaume laudate, violin, orch, 1883
- "arr. of "La marseillaise" for military band, 1887

=== Ballets ===
- "La gipsy – 2nd act of 3-act ballet, 1839
- "Betty – 2 acts, 1846
- "La tempête, ballet fantastique, 3 acts, 1889

=== Chamber ===
- String Quartet, op.1, 1833
- Piano Trio, op.3, c. 1835
- String Quintet, op.7, c. 1839
- Romance, violin, piano, c. 1835
- "Morceau" [de concours], trombone, piano, 1848
- "Morceau" [de concours], violin, cello, 1850
- "Souvenir", piano, violin/viola, undated
- "Barcarolle", flute/violin, piano

=== Piano solo ===
- "6 caprices en forme de valses caractéristiques", op.4, 1835
- "L'absence", nocturne", op.8, c. 1835
- "Andantino", c. 1835
- "Mazurka valaque", c. 1835
- "Fantaisie sur un air favori écossais", op.5, 1836
- "Valse de salon", 1851
- "Cantabile", 1865
- "La dérobée", fantaisie sur un air breton, 1888
- "Rêverie", undated
- "Printemps", undated

=== Organ solo ===
- "Absoute", 1857
- "Offertoire", 1858
- "Prière", 1859
- 3 préludes, 1860
- "Elevazione", undated
- "Dirge", undated
- "10 pastorales", undated

Source: Grove.

== Notes, references and sources ==
=== Sources ===
- Briscoe, James (2015). Contest pieces for trumpet or cornet and piano. Music from the Paris Conservatoire. Middleton: A-R Editions. ISBN 978-0-89579-814-5.
- Grove, George (1879). A Dictionary of Music and Musicians, Volume 1. London: Macmillan. OCLC 906527163.
- Grove, George (1889). A Dictionary of Music and Musicians, Volume 4. London: Macmillan. OCLC 906527163.
- Loewenberg, Alfred (1978) [1955]. Annals of opera, 1597–1940 (third ed.). London: John Calder. ISBN 978-0-7145-3657-6.
- Massenet, Jules; H Villiers Barnett (trans) (1919) [1910]. My Recollections. Boston: Small Maynard. OCLC 774419363.
- Nectoux, Jean-Michel (1991). Gabriel Fauré – A Musical Life. Cambridge: Cambridge University Press. ISBN 978-0-7145-3657-6.
- Nichols, Roger (2011). Ravel. New Haven, US and London: Yale University Press. ISBN 978-0-300-10882-8.
- Orenstein, Arbie (1991) [1975]. Ravel: Man and Musician. Mineola, US: Dover. ISBN 978-0-486-26633-6.
- Orledge, Robert (1982). Debussy and the Theatre. Cambridge: Cambridge University Press. ISBN 978-0-521-22807-7.
- Prod'homme, Jacques-Gabriel; Alfred Dandelot (1911). Gounod: sa vie et ses oeuvres d'apres des documents inedits, Volume 2 (in French). Paris: Delagrave. OCLC 123185385.
- Randel, Don (1996). The Harvard Biographical Dictionary of Music. Cambridge, Mass: Harvard University Press. ISBN 9780674372993. OCLC 1023745280.
- Reid, Charles (1961). Thomas Beecham: An Independent Biography. London: Victor Gollancz. OCLC 500565141.
- Sen, Suddhaseel (2013). "Shakespeare reception in France: the case of Ambroise Thomas' Hamlet". In Joseph M Ortiz (ed.). Shakespeare and the Culture of Romanticism. Farnham: Ashgate. ISBN 978-1-4094-5581-3.
