= Château de Pontchartrain =

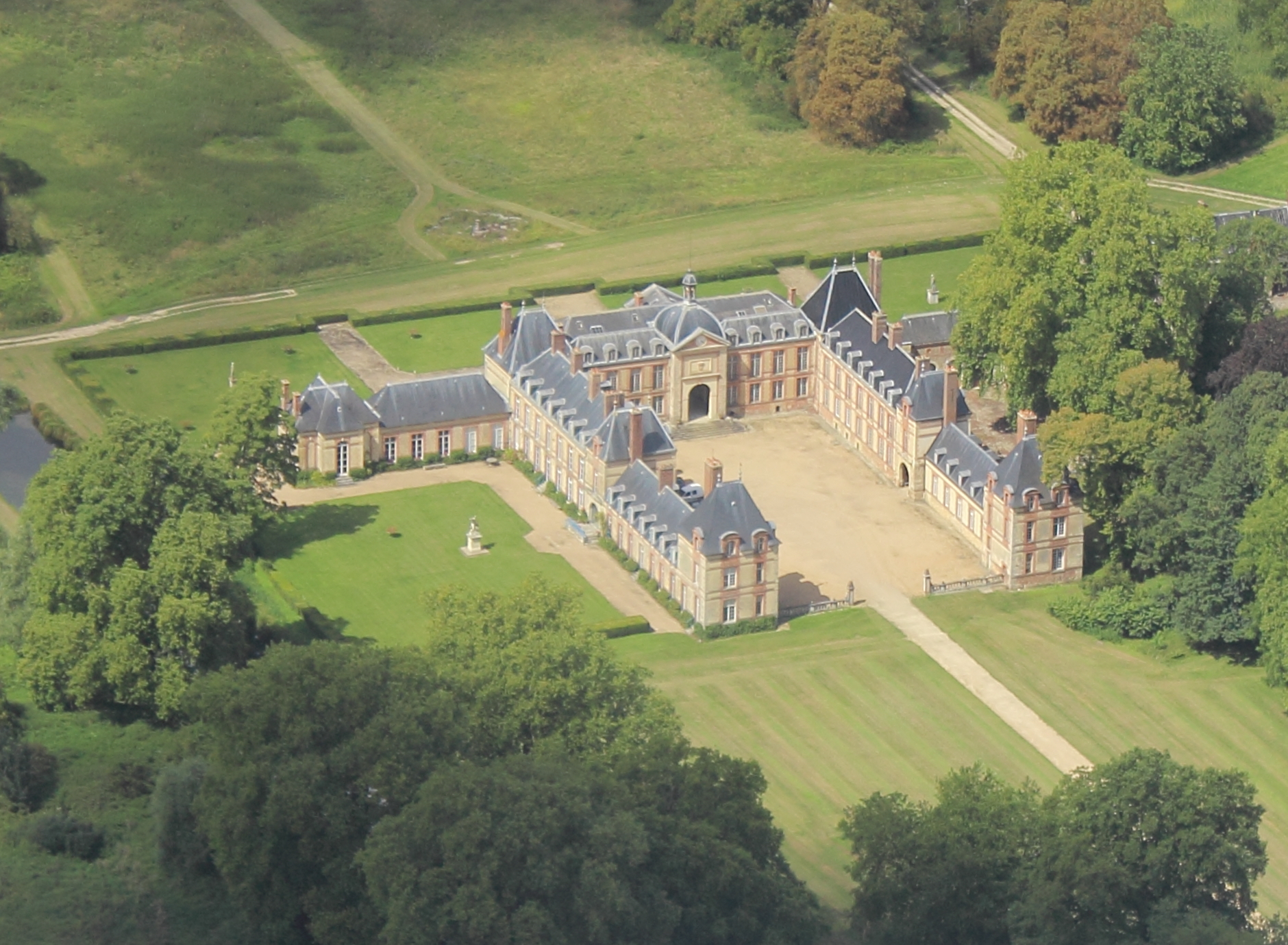
- Château de Pontchartrain

- Location within France
- Former names: Pontem Cartonencem

General information
- Type: Chateau
- Location: Jouars-Pontchartrain, Yvelines, France
- Coordinates: 48.798795°N 1.894929°E
- Construction started: 17th century
- Owner: Private company

Design and construction
- Designations: Historical monument

The Château de Pontchartrain (French pronunciation: [ʃato də pɔ̃ʃaʁtʁɛ̃]) is mainly in the municipality of Jouars-Pontchartrain within Yvelines, in the west of the Île de France region of France.

The west end of its domain (a throwback term for grounds equivalent to demesne: a personal estate of a manorial lord) beyond its ornamental lake named the Étang du Château de Pontchartrain extends into the commune to the west, Le Tremblay-sur-Mauldre. The bulk of the building is two massive wings built in the mid-seventeenth century, by order of owner Louis I Phélypeaux, Comte de Pontchartrain, who was elevated in nobility and in ministerial rank to Chancellor of France. Lake Pontchartrain in Louisiana was named after him as well as the historic Hotel Pontchartrain in New Orleans, as was Fort Pontchartrain du Détroit in Michigan (the site of modern-day Detroit) and Detroit's Hotel Pontchartrain. The main building includes a gallery, dated to between 1598 and 1609, providing communication between the two wings. Later additions include a late 19th century pavilion.

== Location ==
The castle is immediately south of the relatively low density residential area in the north of the commune forming the village itself and west of the D15 road, the Rue Saint-Anne. The N12 dualled road is south of the grounds. The nearest town is that of Maurepas to the south-east.

== History ==
The manor as Pontem Cartonencem is mentioned around 1325 or 1330. In the 16th century this manor, which could have been at the site of the right wing of the castle, was probably abandoned to farmers while a new house was built on the site of the current left wing. In 1598 the property was acquired by Antoine de Buade de Frontenac, "captain of the châteaux of Saint-Germain-en-Laye and Saint-James et La Muette."

Antoine de Buade de Frontenac sold Pontchartrain in 1609 to Paul Phélypeaux (1569 - 1621), secretary to Queen Marie de' Medici. In 1613 Frontenac's son Henri de Buade married Anne Phélypeaux, daughter of Paul Phélypeaux's brother Raymond Phélypeaux. Their son Louis de Buade de Frontenac was to be Lieutenant General of the colony of New France in North America.

=== Phélypeaux family ===
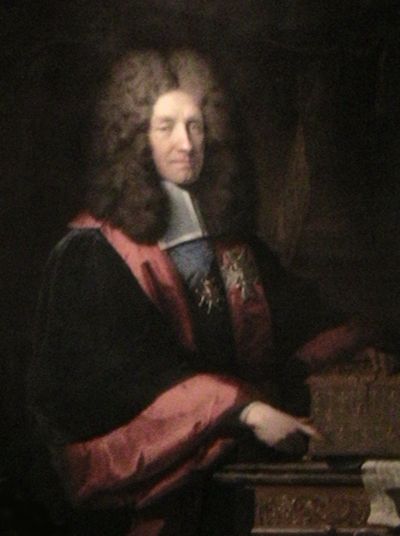
Louis Phélypeaux, comte de Pontchartrain (1643–1727)

Paul Phélypeaux was the king's counselor in 1610 and the founder of the Pontchartrain branch of the Phélypeaux family, which kept the chateau until 1802 under a supervised sale of the French Revolution. His son Louis I Phélypeaux had the main building built between 1633 and 1662, whose attribution to François Mansart is unfounded.

Jean Phélypeaux (1646-1711), intendent of Paris from 1690 to 1709, councilor of state, was a client of the cabinetmaker André-Charles Boulle.

Louis II Phélypeaux de Pontchartrain, Jean's brother, was Controller of Finance in 1689 and Chancellor in 1699. Chancellor Pontchartrain was described by Saint-Simon as a "very small, thin man, who constantly emitted sparks of fire and spirit." He assumed the name of the property, where he assigned brother François Romain and André Le Nôtre to raise the chateau and in 1693 to design a magnificent park. After his wife died he was grief-stricken and resigned all his offices, "which, in the opinion of his contemporaries, had never been seen" wrote Saint-Simon. He retired to Pontchartrain, where he died.

His only son Jérôme Phélypeaux was Secretary of State of the Navy, and in 1699 a Canadian lake was given his name. He was also Secretary of State of the King's House, "who delighted in rendering ill services and who amused the King with the gossip of Paris", according to Saint-Simon who hated him but nevertheless in 1713 attended his remarriage at the chateau.After the death of Louis XIV he continued to attend the Council to "blow out the candles " before Saint-Simon got the Regent to exile him in Pontchartrain, where in 1738 he transformed the main building behind the courtyard.

When Jérôme Phélypeaux died the estate passed to his son Jean Frédéric Phélypeaux, Count of Maurepas. At the age of 22, Maurepas assumed the position of Secretary of State that his father had held, as a confidant of Louis XV. He was the protector of the sisters of (Mailly) Nesles, their parents, successive favorites of the king.

He was disgraced in 1749 for a song mocking Madame de Pompadour, then recalled in 1774 by Louis XVI, who made him First Minister. In 1781 he died childless at the age of 80, and Pontchartrain passed to his niece Adélaide Diane Hortense Délie Mazarini-Mancini (1742-1808), daughter of the Duke of Nevers. In 1760 she had married the Duke Louis-Hercule Timoléon de Cossé-Brissac, commander of the constitutional guard of Louis XVI. He was killed on 9 September 1792 in Versailles, and his head was thrown from the street into the house of Madame du Barry. The estate was immediately subject to effective receivership, with limited funds available to its heir, the dis-ennobled Duchess.

=== Destillières and D'Osmonds ===
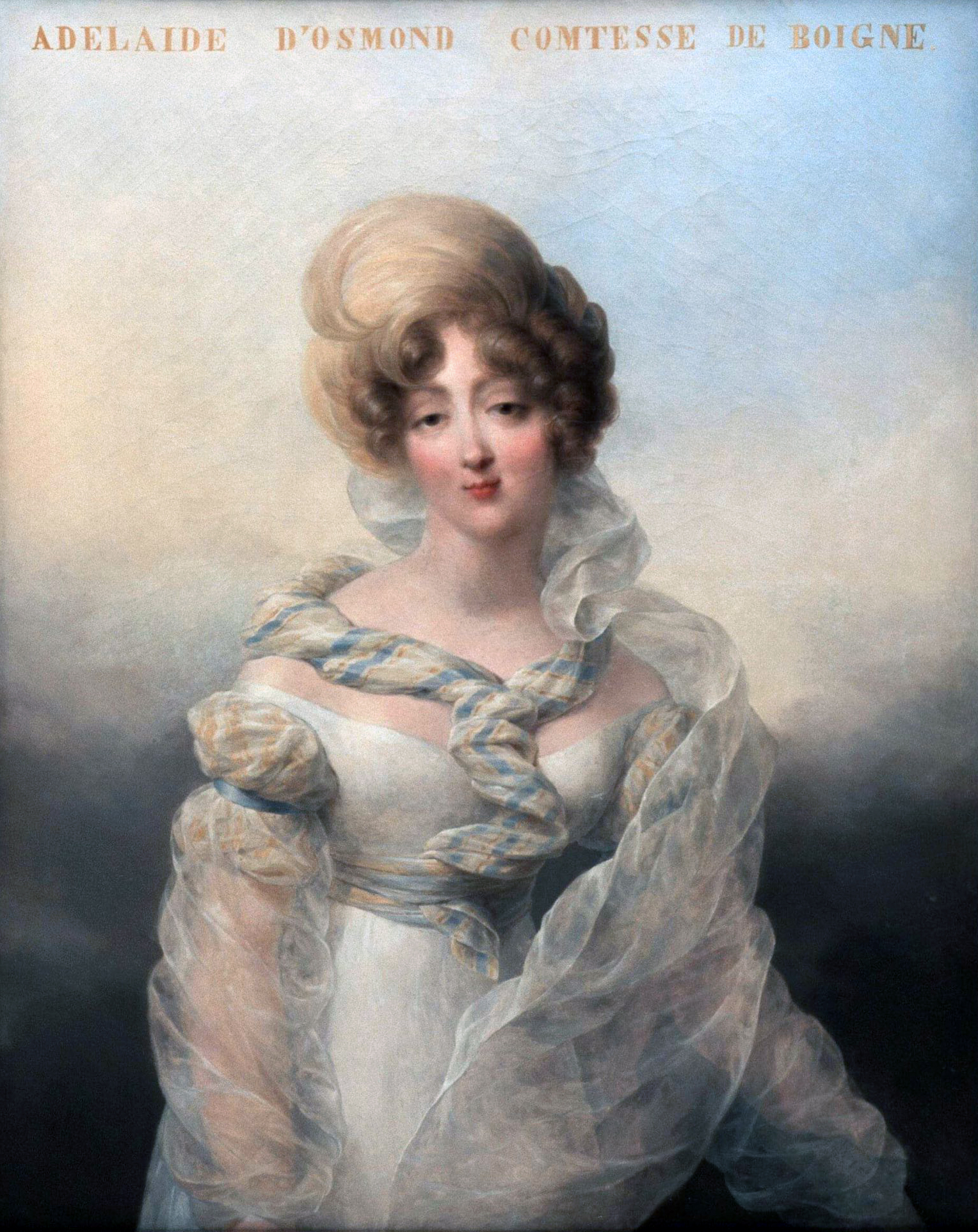
Adèle d'Osmond, Countess of Boigne (1781-1866.)

In 1801 the dis-ennobled Duchess of Brissac by the state terms of receivership of aristocratic estates sold Pontchartrain at a permitted, reduced value to the industrialist and speculator Claude Caroillon Destillières, a leader of the "Black Band" syndicate of businessmen enriched by the Directory who specialized in the purchase and liquidation of the great aristocratic estates. He had the gardens transformed from the French style to that of an English park by the fashionable landscaper Louis-Martin Berthault, who was later employed in the 1820s by James Mayer de Rothschild to organize the first receptions he gave at his Paris hotel. When Destillières died in 1814 his huge fortune and land holdings passed to his daughter, Aimée Caroillon des Tillières.

In 1817 Aimée married the dis-ennobled Count and then re-ennobled Marquis (1838) Rainulphe Eustache d'Osmond, aide to the Duke of Angoulême, whose older sister Adèle d'Osmond, Countess of Boigne, spoke of the library at Pontchartrain in her memoirs.

The painter Jean-Baptiste Isabey, who taught Aimée d'Osmond drawing and was her friend, had his room in the chateau, where in 1815 he produced views of the interior.

=== Von Donnersmarck ===
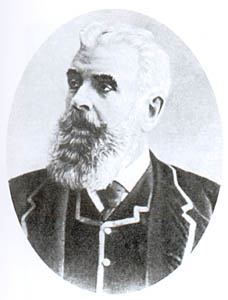
Guido Henckel von Donnersmarck (1830-1916)

In 1857 d'Osmond's son sold the estate to Count Guido Henckel von Donnersmarck for his mistress Esther or Thérèse Lachmann, called La Païva after her marriage in 1851 to the rich Marquis Aranjo de Paiva, a cousin of the Minister of Portugal in Paris. This rich young Prussian aristocrat, a cousin of Bismarck, had the house restored by the architect Pierre Manguin. His mistress had it redecorated and renovated the park where she created vistas and planted rare species. The local peasants were scandalized to see her galloping in the park dressed as a man. Paul Lacroix said that there were two large paintings at the chateau depicting the chase and the arrival of Louis XIV, in which Madame de Montespan appears.

The Marquis de Paiva committed suicide, and in 1871 his widow married the Count von Donnersmarck, who had returned to Pontchartrain, where she replaced the servants by German staff. The Prussian occupation in 1870 left Pontchartrain intact, property of the Count, now Governor of Alsace-Lorraine. Perhaps suspected of espionage, La Païva left France in 1877 for Neudeck (now Świerklaniec) in Silesia, where she had Lefuel build her the palace where she died in 1884. The chateau collection was sold at public auction at Drouot on 9 February 1884. In 1888 the count, unwelcome in France, sold the chateau with its forest of 1,200 hectares (3,000 acres).

=== Dreyfus ===
The chateau was bought by the financier, industrialist and collector Auguste Dreyfus (1827–1897) and his wife Luisa Gonzalez de Andia Orbegoso (1847-1924), Marquise de Villahermosa and granddaughter of Luis José de Orbegoso, one of the first presidents of the Republic of Peru. Dreyfus had married her in Lima in 1873. The worldly Louis-Gabriel Pringué, one of Luisa's close friends, attributed to her a secret diplomatic role before the vote on the Law on the Congregations (7 July 1904), saying she tried to work for an agreement between the French and Pope Leo XIII. Pringué describes the quasi-royal life at Pontchartrain, reminiscent of the court of Madrid. Luisa Gonzalez de Andia Orbegoso Marchionness of Villahermosa was wealthy from emerald mines in Peru and Chile, and from islands covered in guano, for which she had a monopoly. In the morning she would discuss business in her grand boudoir, with 18th century woodwork, decorated with work by Velasquez, Goya and Rubens. She always dressed in black, like a portrait by Velasquez, with five rows of large white pearls in the daytime replaced by three rivers of diamonds in the evening.

She would appear in the lobby around noon, wearing a large black tulle hat, and would enter a large victoria drawn by large black horses, with coachman and footman in full uniform, to see her garden. She would trot among the regular and fragrant flowerbeds, examining the fruit, flowers and vegetables that the gardeners would present on silver plates. In the afternoon she went out for long trips in the countryside, always with horses, only using an automobile to go to Dreux or Paris. There was a sense of living in the time of Louis XIV. Every Sunday, a White Father came from Paris to celebrate Mass at noon in the chapel. The Marquise and her two daughters, covered with Spanish mantillas, would take place in their box lined with red velvet ...

Auguste Dreyfus was the sole concessionaire of the Peruvian State for the operation and sale of guano against the debt service of the country. Although converted to Catholicism in 1862, he was a target of French anti-Semites, and French nationality was refused to one of his two sons. He was close to the Republicans Jules Grévy, who was one of his first defenders (he employed 54 lawyers in three trials), and Pierre Waldeck-Rousseau, whom he named as his executor in 1890. He gathered an important collection of art in his mansion at 5 Ruysdael avenue in Paris - the Dreyfus-Gonzalez collection was sold at public auction in 1896 - where his widow lived until 1924. He had the chateau transformed and enlarged by the architect Émile Boeswillwald and recreated the French garden created in the late seventeenth century .

=== Later years ===
In 1932 Dreyfus's heirs sold the estate to the Lagasse family, who in 1940 had the central pavilion pierced with an archway leading to wide steps connecting the courtyard to the gardens. Around 1970 its integrity was threatened by a traffic diversion project from the RN 12 that brought 20,000 vehicles per day through the village, and by a development project to build 1,000 housing units in the plain and park. The potential damage was the subject of a television broadcast in February 1975. The castle is now owned by a private company.

== Architecture ==
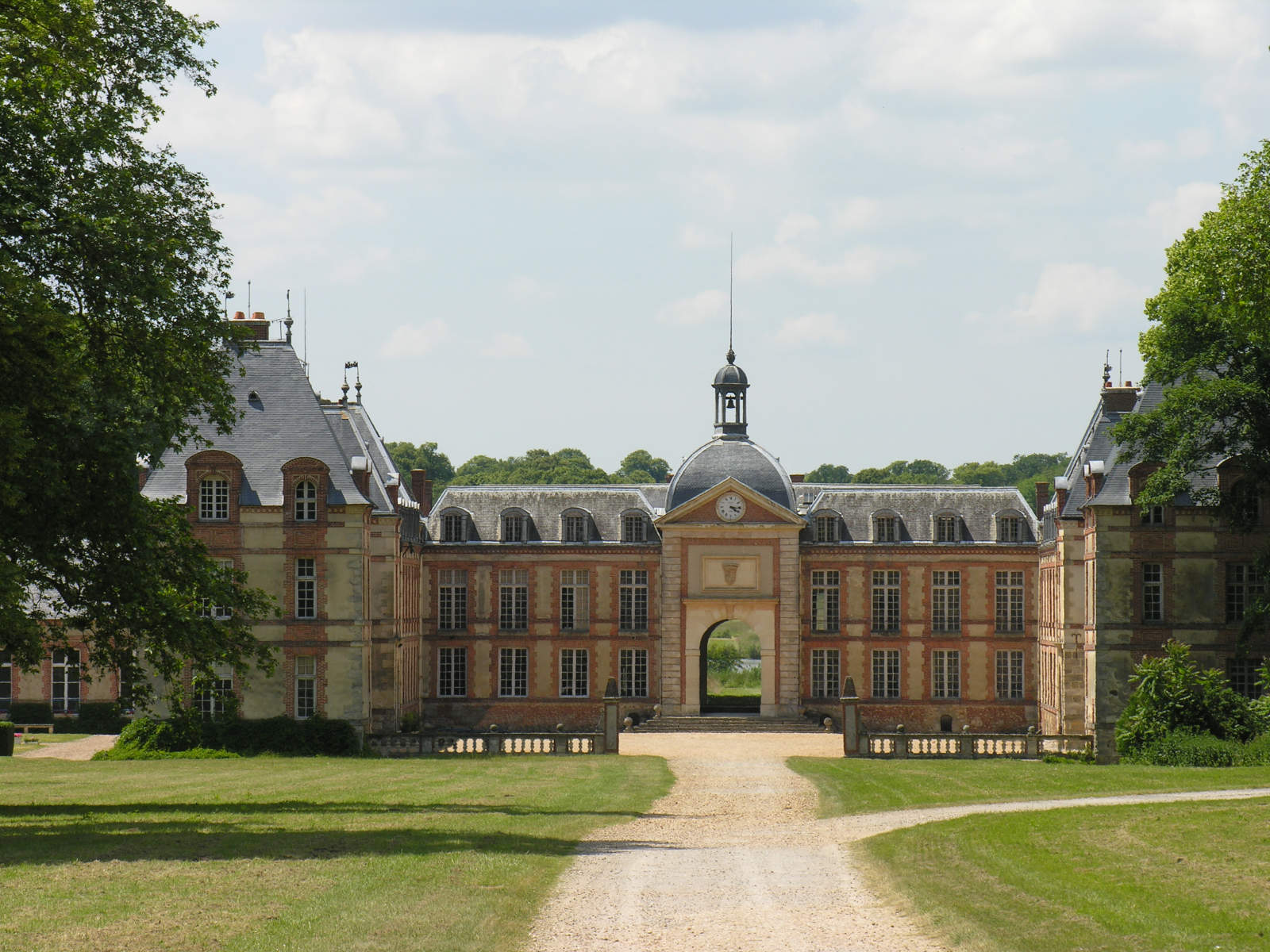
Main entrance

The two great wings of the castle were built around the middle of the 17th century following the traditional U-shaped French plan, featuring a central building behind the courtyard, which was enclosed with two wings, and surrounded by a moat. The main building includes a gallery, probably built between 1598 and 1609, providing communication between the two wings, an unusual arrangement - where the central body serves as a link - reminiscent of the Château d'Écouen, and is probably the result of successive stages of construction. This central body was rebuilt in 1738 and remodeled in the late 19th century by Boeswillwald, who has doubled in depth the garden side. The axial pavilion was pierced in 1940 by a vaulted passage, somewhat anachronistic.

The wings are composed of three pavilions connected by an elongated body. They are built of brick and stone, brick being used as a material following an approach that is also found in Château de Grosbois and the Château des Mesnuls. It is possible that the main apartments were in the left wing and the servants or commons in the right wing. In front of the central pavilion of the right wing, a bridge spanned the gap to provide access to the backyard. The stables and important outbuildings were built in the early 18th century, probably by brother Romain. The chapel was in the left wing, accessible by a gallery on the ground floor in the alignment of the main building. In 1703 it was replaced by an octagonal room, probably by brother Romain, but the Dreyfuses used another chapel according to Pringué. The gallery that leads to the chapel dates to 1653. This gallery-salon arrangement was repeated symmetrically in the right wing by Boeswillwald. The building and its outbuildings were listed on the Inventory of Historical Monuments by order of 14 December 1979.

== Sources ==
- "Château de Pontchartrain". Mérimée. Ministry of Culture.
- Clément, Pierre (1868). Mme de Montespan et Louis XIV. Paris.
- Frontenac, Antoine de Buade de; Pontchartrain, Paul Phélypeaux de (1609). Acte par lequel le Sr. de Frontenac vend au seigneur Paul Phélypeaux la seigneurie de Pontchartrain.
- d'Osmond, Louise-Eléonore-Charlotte-Adélaide (1925). Récits d'une tante: Mémoires de la comtesse de Boigne née d'Osmond, publiés intégralement d'après le manuscrit original. Emile-Paul frères.
- "Les de Buade de Frontenac" (in French). Association pour la protection et la promotion du site de PALLUAU sur Indre. Archived from the original on 2013-11-15.
- Parkman, Francis (1983). France and England in North America. Library of America. p. 325. ISBN 978-0-940450-11-0.
- Pradère, Alexandre (June 1991). "Du style Troubadour au style Boulle". Connaissance des Arts (472).
- Samoyault, Jean-Pierre (1979). André-Charles Boulle et sa famille. Droz.
