= Hotel Pontchartrain =

Hotel Pontchartrain may refer to:

- The Crowne Plaza Detroit Downtown Convention Center, Detroit, Michigan (as its prior name)
- The Pontchartrain Hotel, New Orleans, Louisiana
