= Henriette Delamarre de Monchaux =

French geologist and paleontologist (1854–1911)

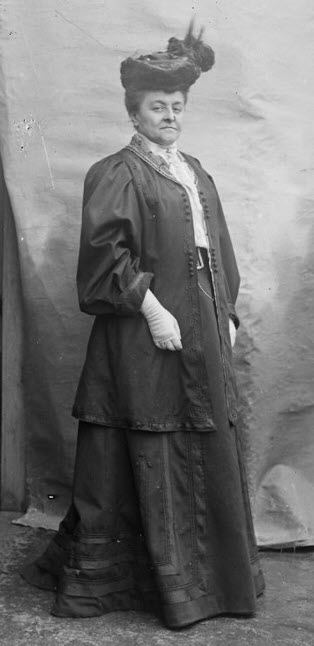
- Henriette Delamarre de Monchaux in 1908
- Born: Valentine Henriette Huberte Delamarre de Monchaux; 11 October 1854; Paris, France
- Died: 12 May 1911 (aged 56); Paris, France
- Other name: Countess Pierre Lecointre
- Known for: Falun deposit research
- Spouse: Roman Count Pierre Lecointre
- Children: 3
- Scientific career
- Fields: Naturalistic observation Paleontology

Henriette Delamarre de Monchaux, née Valentine Henriette Huberte Delamarre de Monchaux, also known as Valentine Henriette Huberte Lecointre (11 October 1854 – 12 May 1911), was a French naturalist, geologist and paleontologist. She was a pioneer in the latter two disciplines, becoming a specialist in faluns, a type of marine deposit. Her works, notably Les Faluns de La Touraine, support the theory of evolution. She was also a committed feminist. In 1875, she married Pierre Lecointre, a Roman Count. She signed several of her articles as Countess Pierre Lecointre, and she is still sometimes identified by that surname.

== Early life and education ==
Henriette Delamarre de Monchaux was the daughter of Mathilde Lyautey and Théodore Didier Delamarre, a painter. Her maternal grandfather was the celebrated General Hubert Joseph Lyautey while her paternal grandfather was Théodore-Casimir Delamarre, a banker and politician.

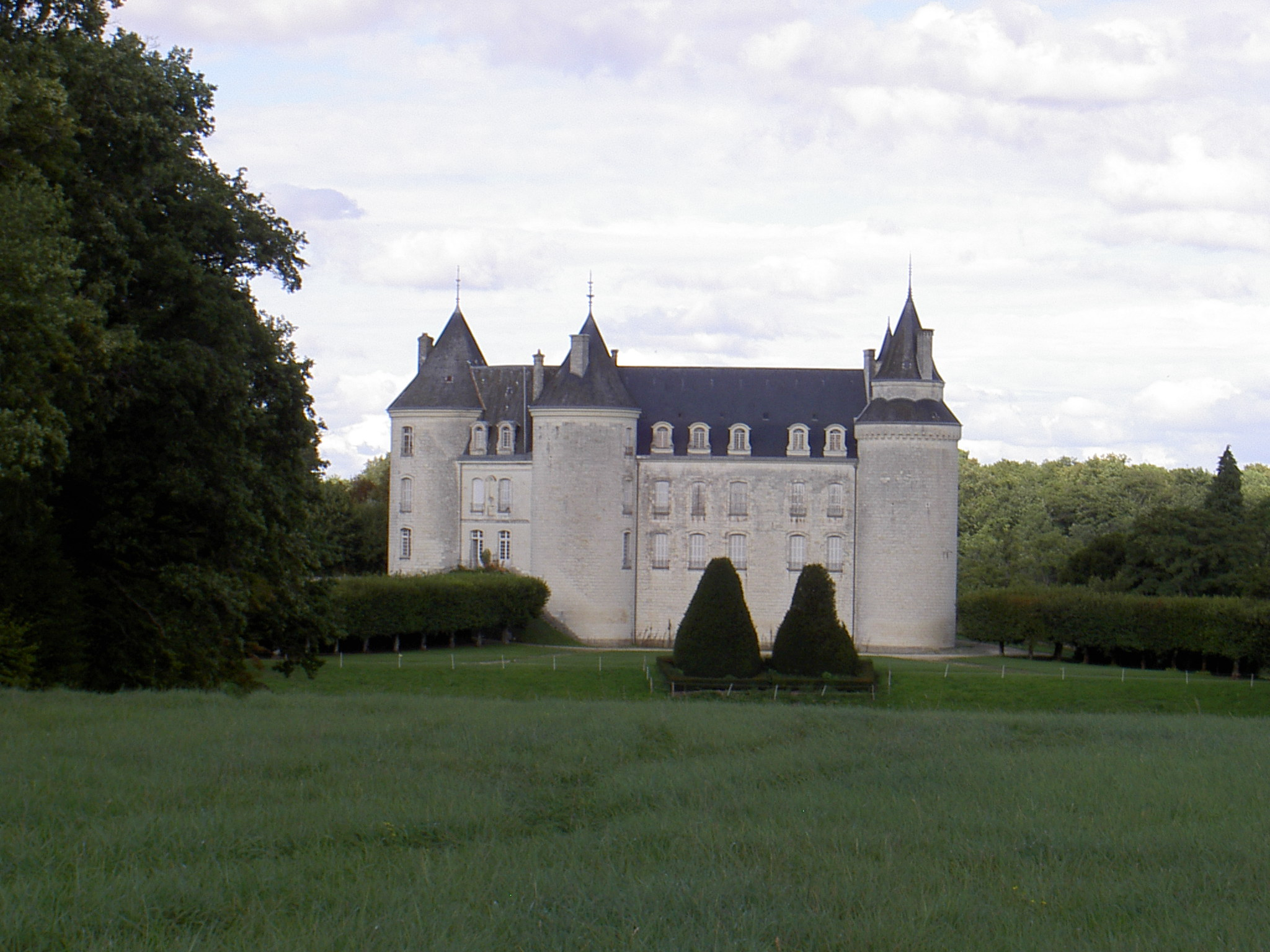
Château de Grillemont in La Chapelle-Blanche-Saint-Martin.

Henriette Delamarre de Monchaux married Roman Count Pierre Lecointre (born 1841) on 25 August 1875 and took the name Countess Lecointre. With Lecointre, she had two daughters, Marie and Mathilde, and a son, Georges. Her husband was a member of several learned societies, including the Archaeological Society of Touraine and the Geographical Society of Paris. The couple lived at Château de Grillemont, in La Chapelle-Blanche-Saint-Martin commune (Indre-et-Loire). Both expressed a strong attachment to Roman Catholicism and royalism; Henriette became president of the Association des dames et jeunes filles royalistes of Touraine. The national organisation was led by the Marquise de Mac Mahon.

Countess Lecointre developed an interest in a wide range of subjects, including regionalism through exploring Touraine folklore, and became a committed suffragist. She also developed a scientific interest in geology and paleontology.

== Research on falun deposits ==
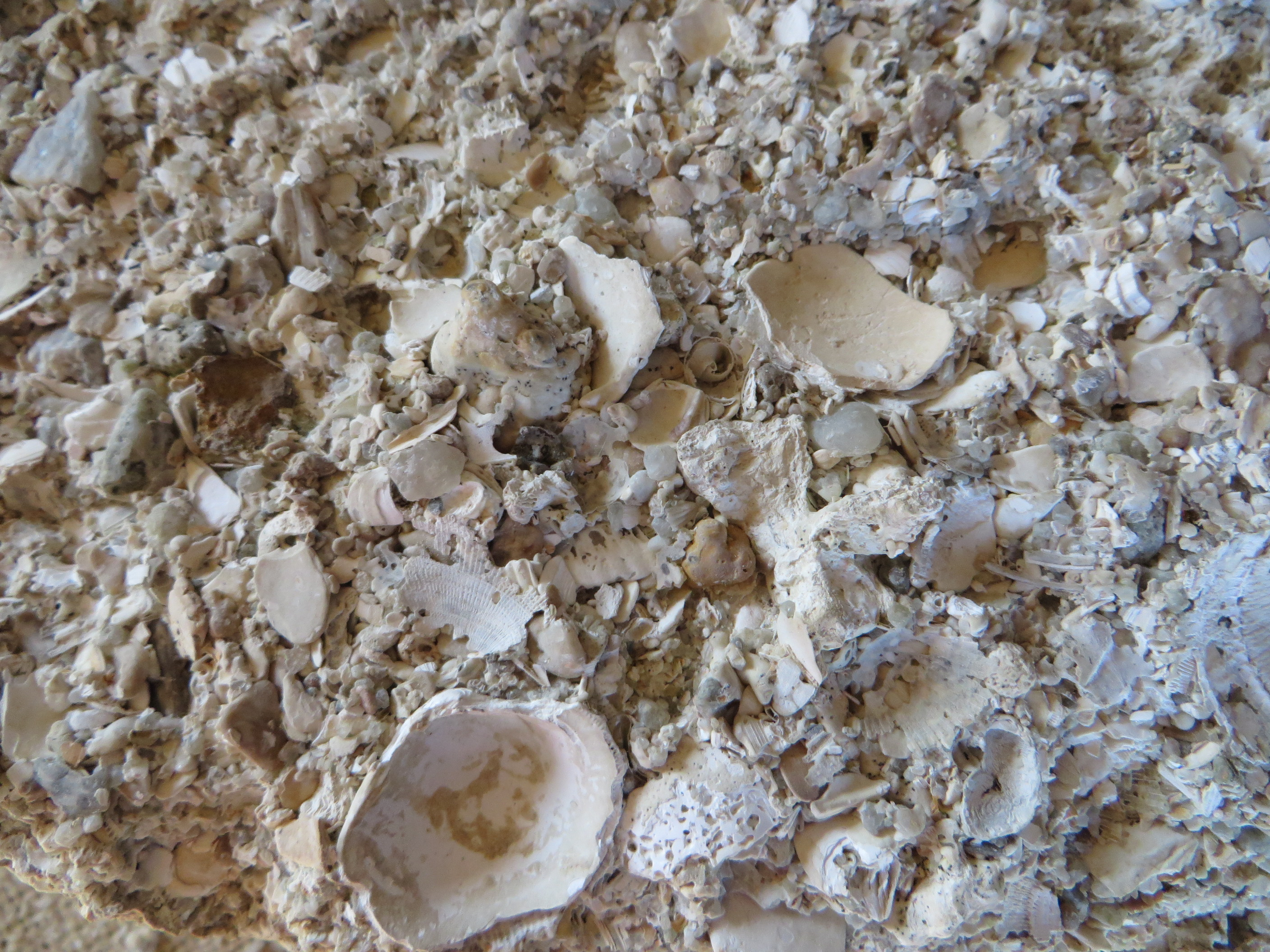
Falun is a marine sedimentary deposit that is often scattered over vast areas, formed from shell debris.

From the 1890s onwards, Countess Lecointre built up a large collection of Miocene fossils and conducted studies on the Touraine cliffs, initially on her own. She then relied on regular exchanges with other European scientists, notably Gustave-Frédéric Dollfus (1850–1931), President of the French Geological Society, who had a major influence on her; Philippe Dautzenberg (1849–1935), a Belgian malacologist and zoologist; Lucien Mayet (1874–1949), a lecturer at the University of Lyon; and Constant Houlbert (1857–1945), an entomologist and professor at the University of Rennes.

She was also in contact with researchers at scientific institutions such as the Muséum d'Histoire Naturelle in Paris and the Société des Sciences Naturelles in Blois. In 1908, She was admitted to the science section of the Société d’agriculture, sciences, arts et belles-lettres /(Society for Agriculture, Science, Arts and Literature) in the Indre-et-Loire department of France.

Her work was based on her fossil collection. She took part in the study of nearby falun deposits and the fossils she found there. She saw this as confirmation of the theory of evolution, of which she was an early supporter. Falun are calcareous sedimentary rock from the Miocene period, generally friable. She made known her interest in the substance as an agricultural amendment well-suited to the majority of the acid silt soils of the neighboring Sainte-Maure Plateau; the falun deposits, in fact, represent only a few patches in a landscape of mediocre soils.

Her work was published between 1907 and 1911. Her book Les faluns de Touraine (Tours, 1908) reviews the fossil record and the evolution of ideas on the subject throughout history. In 1909, she collaborated with Lucien Mayet on a publication on mammal remains detectable in falun deposits. The same year, she compared the faunas of the Touraine deposits with those of the Middle Miocene collected in the southeastern United States. She passed on her passion to her son Georges, who became a geologist and paleontologist.

== Humanitarian and feminist causes ==
She was involved in several humanitarian, social and feminist causes. In 1884, she helped found a nursing society, and in 1908, the National Civil Rights and Women's Suffrage Congress. Delamarre de Monchaux was also active in the Congrès national des droits civils et du suffrage des femmes (National Council of French Women). As a close associate of Hubertine Auclert, she regularly called for women's right to vote.

In her book Les Dames de Tourraine, Sylvie Pouliquen refers to how she valiantly battled against those she called 'submissionists', rallying support from organizations including the Union des femmes royalistes, the Fédération Jeanne d'Arc and the Comit'e des Dames royalistes de Touraine.

== Death and legacy ==
Henriette Delamarre de Monchaux died in Paris on 13 April 1911. The taxa Tristomanthus lecointreæ, Fibularia lecointreæ and Echinanthus lecointreæ, including sea urchin species, were dedicated to her because she had collected the studied specimens.

Her son paleontologist Georges Lecointre continued her work, demonstrating the value of falun as an agricultural soil improver. He bequeathed a large part of his family's collections to the Grand-Pressigny Prehistory Museum.

In 2026, Delamarre de Monchaux was announced as one of 72 historical women in STEM whose names have been proposed to be added to the 72 men already celebrated on the Eiffel Tower. The plan was conceived by a student and tour guide named Bernard Rigaud. He had been surprised to find that there were no women included when he was showing visitors the 72 names on the tower. He originally proposed to add 40 women to the second level. It was announced by the Mayor of Paris, Anne Hidalgo following the recommendations of a committee led by Isabelle Vauglin of Femmes et Sciences and Jean-François Martins, representing the operating company which runs the Eiffel Tower.

== Selected publications ==
Writing as Comtesse Pierre Lecoitre or Valentine Henriette Huberte Lecointre, she published the following:

- (1908): Les faluns de Tourraine
- {1908 and 1910): Editions of Études des faluns de Touraine en 1908 et 1909

And together with Lucien Mayer:

- (1909): Étude sommaire des mammifères fossiles des Faluns de la Touraine : proprement dite: Bossée, le Louroux, Manthelan, La Chapelle-Blanche, Sainte-Maure, Paulmy, Ferrière-Larçon, Savigné-sur-Lathan
