= Buade =

Buade may refer to:

== Places ==
- Buade Lake (Normandin River), Quebec, Canada
- Fort de Buade, a French fort in the present U.S. state of Michigan

== People ==
- Antoine de Buade (c. 1567–1626), seigneur de Frontenac, a French soldier and diplomat, grandfather of Louis
- Henri de Buade (1596–1622), French aristocrat and father of Louis
- Louis de Buade de Frontenac (1622–1698), a governor of New France

== See also ==
- Buades
