= Melchior de Vogüé =

French archaeologist (1829–1916)

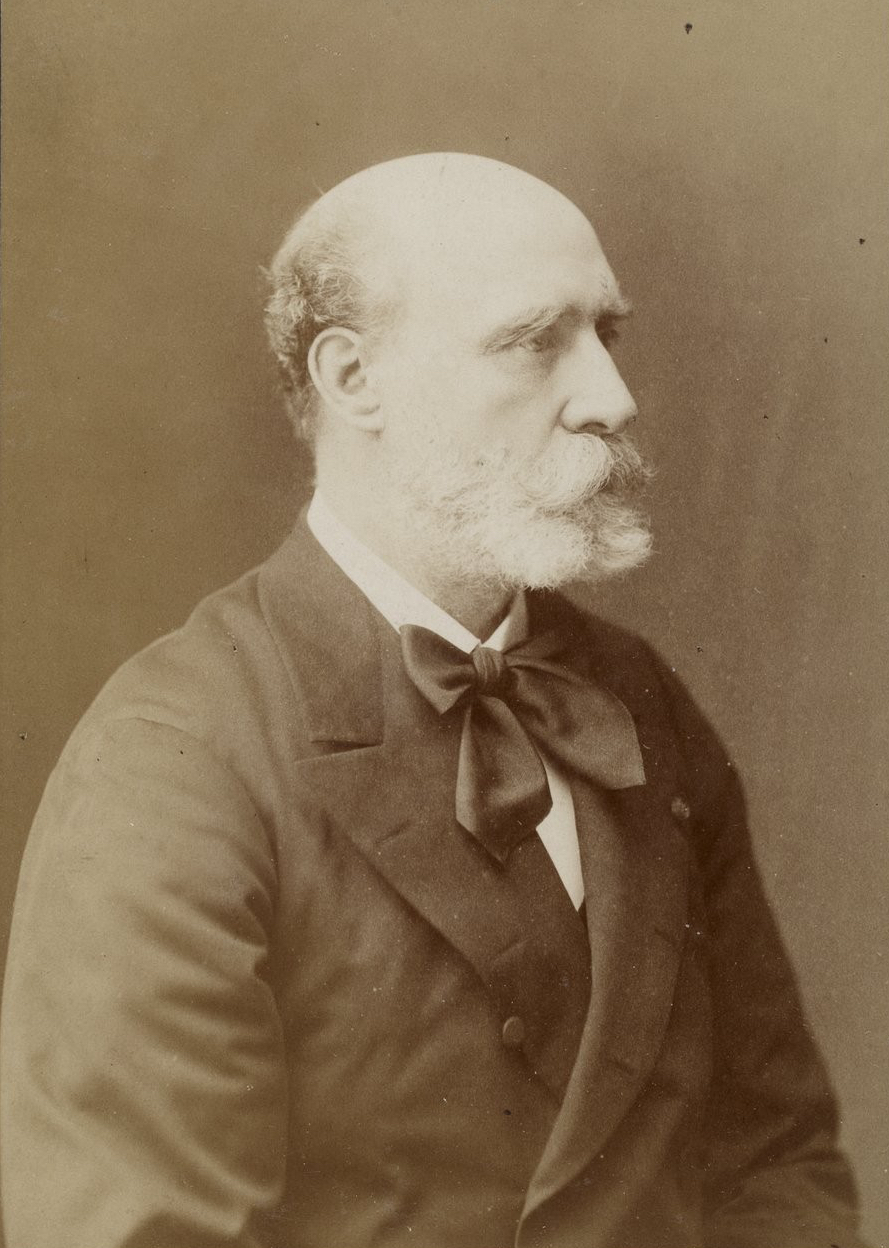
Melchior de Vogüé

Charles-Jean-Melchior, Marquis de Vogüé (18 October 1829 – 10 November 1916) was a French archaeologist, diplomat, and member of the Académie française in seat 18.

== Biography ==
Born in Paris as the eldest son of Léonce de Vogüé, Melchior de Vogüé was schooled at the École spéciale militaire de Saint-Cyr and at the École Polytechnique. In 1849, he was attached to the French Embassy in St. Petersburg.

After his father's arrest during the French coup of 1851, de Vogüé gave up diplomacy to focus on archaeology and history in Syria and Palestine. Named as a member of the Académie des Inscriptions et Belles-Lettres in 1868, he continued to publish scholarly journal articles on churches in the Holy Land, the Temple of Jerusalem, and Central Syria.

He was a prominent agrarian and President of the Société des agriculteurs de France.

After the fall of the Second French Empire, President Adolphe Thiers appointed him as Ambassador of France to Constantinople in 1871, then to Vienna in 1875.

He was the first scholar who was allowed to research inside the Dome of the Rock in Jerusalem.

== Family ==
Melchior de Vogüé was the father of 6 children, including Marthe de Vogüé.

He was the uncle of fellow academician Eugène-Melchior de Vogüé, who served concurrently for a few years in seat 39 from 1888. His grandson, Jean Alexandre Melchior de Vogüé, was married to the French writer and businesswoman Hélène Marie Henriette Jaunez.

== Works ==
- Fragments d'un journal de voyage en Orient. Côtes de la Phénicie (1855)
- Note sur quelques inscriptions recueillies à Palmyre (1855)
- Notes d'épigraphie araméenne (1856) [cf. Aramean epigraphy]
- de Vogüé, Melchior (1860). Les églises de la Terre Sainte.
- Les Événements de Syrie (1860) [cf. Youssef Bey Karam and conflict between Maronites and Druze]
- Mémoire sur une nouvelle inscription phénicienne (1860)
- Notice sur un talent de bronze trouvé à Abydos (1862)
- Bulletin de l'Œuvre des pèlerinages en Terre-Sainte : histoire, géographie, ethnographie et archéologie biblique et religieuse (1863)
- Inscriptions araméennes et nabatéennes du Haouran (1864)
- Inscriptions hébraïques de Jérusalem (1864)
- Le Temple de Jérusalem, monographie du Haram-ech-Chérif, suivie d'un Essai sur la topographie de la Ville-sainte (1864) [cf. the Haram ash-Sharif]
- L'Alphabet hébraïque et l'alphabet araméen (1865)
- L'Islamisme et son fondateur (1865)
- Syrie centrale. Architecture civile et religieuse du Ier au VIIe siècle (1865–1877)
- Le Duc de Luynes (1868)
- Mélanges d'archéologie orientale (1868)
- Syrie centrale. Inscriptions sémitiques (1868–1877)
- Six inscriptions phéniciennes d'Idalion (1875)
- Stèle de Yehawmelek, roi de Gebal (1875)
- Monnaies et sceaux des croisades (1877)
- Monnaies inédites des croisades (1880–1890)
- Note sur la forme du tombeau d'Eschmounazar (1880)
- Madame de Maintenon et le maréchal de Villars. Correspondance inédite (1881) Madame de Maintenon et le maréchal de Villars. Correspondance inédite
- Inscriptions palmyréniennes inédites : un tarif sous l'Empire romain (1883)
- Mémoires du maréchal de Villars, publiés, d'après le manuscrit original, pour la Société de l'histoire de France, et accompagnés de correspondances inédites (1884–1904)
- La Stèle de Dhmêr (1885)
- Villars et l'électeur de Bavière Max-Emmanuel (1885) [cf. Maximilian II Emanuel, Elector of Bavaria]
- Le roman russe (1886)
- Note sur une inscription bilingue de Tello et sur quatre intailles sémitiques (1887)
- Villars d'après sa correspondance et des documents inédits (1888)
- Note sur les nécropoles de Carthage (1889)
- Note sur une inscription punique trouvée par le P. Delattre à Carthage (1892)
- Le Comte Riant (1893–1896)
- Vases carthaginois (1893)
- Note sur une borne milliaire arabe du Ier siècle de l'hégire (1894)
- Le Duc de Bourgogne et Beauvillier, d'après des correspondances inédites (1895)
- Monnaies inédites des croisades (1895–1905)
- Monnaies juives (1895–1905)
- La bataille d'Oudenarde (1897) [cf. the Battle of Oudenarde]
- La bataille de Malplaquet (1897) [cf. the Battle of Malplaquet]
- La victoire de Denain (1897) [cf. the Battle of Denain]
- Le Véritable vainqueur de Denain (1903)
- Notice sur l'hôtel de Villars (1904)
- Une famille vivaroise, histoires d'autrefois racontées à ses enfants (1906)
- La Citerne de Ramleh et le tracé des arcs brisés (1912)
- Une Fête à Aubenas en 1732 (1912)
- Jérusalem hier et aujourd'hui (1912)
- Thureau-Dangin (1913)
