= Méditation sur la politique de Jeanne d'Arc =

Meditation on the Politics of Joan of Arc
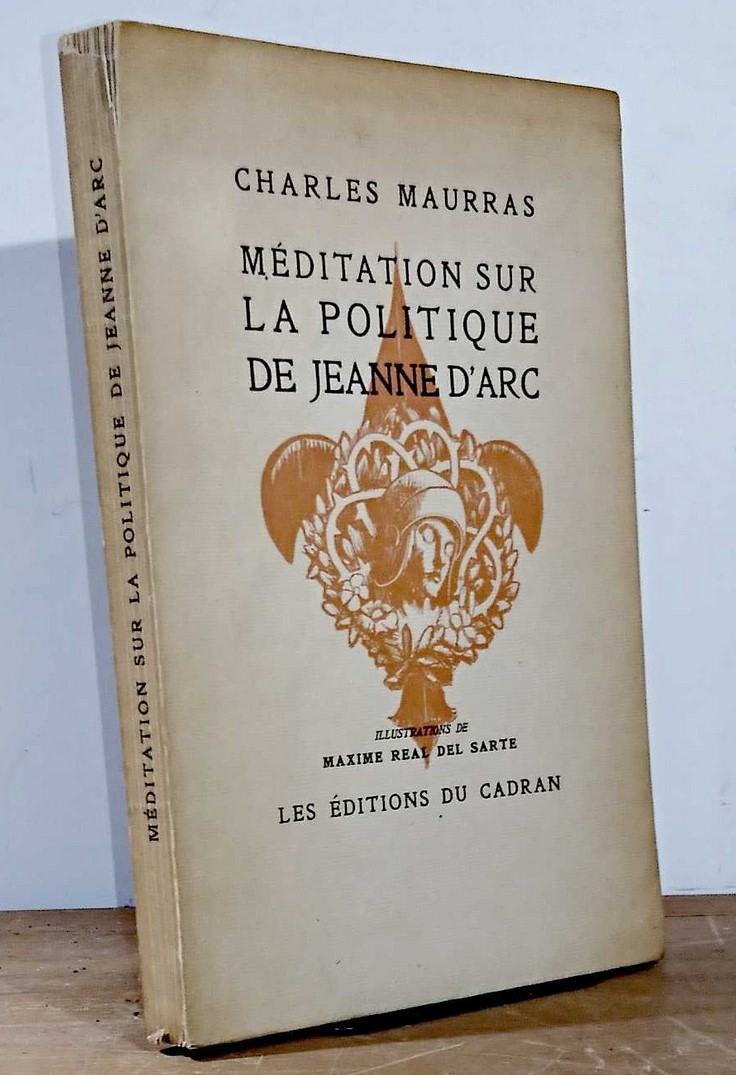
- Original cover.
- Author: Charles Maurras
- Original title: Méditation sur la politique de Jeanne d'Arc
- Illustrator: Maxime Real del Sarte
- Genre: Politics
- Published: Paris
- Publisher: Éditions du Cadran
- Publication date: 1931
- Publication place: France
- Preceded by: Four Nights in Provence
- Followed by: Before Eternal Germany

Méditation sur la politique de Jeanne d'Arc (Meditation on the Politics of Joan of Arc) is a book by French journalist and politician Charles Maurras published in 1931. The text opposes the republican narrative of the epic of Joan of Arc and emphasizes the political character of the mission of the "Maid of Orléans."

== Overview ==
=== Background ===
The major writings of Charles Maurras on Joan of Arc date from the 1920s and 1930s. During the Thalamas affair or the campaign to establish the Joan of Arc Day as a national holiday, Maurras rarely expressed views "on the character and royalism of the Maid".

The text originates from a lecture delivered in 1929 to the Association of Royalist Young Ladies, enhanced by illustrations by Maxime Real del Sarte.

=== Analysis ===
According to historian Philippe Contamine, the narrative "draws heavily on motifs from the classical right-wing discourse, but it is original and innovative on several levels". Firstly, the text's anachronism is a distinctive feature, echoing "royalist writings of the 17th-18th centuries". To Maurras, Joan of Arc was neither a democrat nor a rebel but appeared more as a royalist than as the "gentle inheritor of the brutal movement of the Jacqueries," according to Jean Jaurès. Joan, Maurras argues, understood the necessity of a king for building France. "Her thoughts and heart clearly reveal the three guiding ideas of the ancient French Third Estate: the preserved Patrimony and the saved Nation through the restored Monarchy."

Maurras's analysis highlights Joan of Arc's central political mission. He cites her prioritization of leading the King to the Reims coronation over pursuing military action after the Siege of Orléans and the Battle of Patay. Maurras believed Joan knew that nothing substantial could be achieved without the King. "The essential spirit of Joan of Arc's mission is that national salvation is achieved through the King's work.

Joan of Arc, Maurras argues, used a military language similar to the soldiers of World War I: "We shall have them". According to Maurras, Joan embodied a soldier's spirit but was not a "forerunner of the armed nation".

The text concludes with:

It seems permissible to salute in Joan of Arc her fidelity to what is most enduring and vital: the State, the King, in the structure of her work, our Nation.

—

=== Legacy ===
The text was reprinted in Maurras's Joan of Arc, Louis XIV, Napoleon in 1937 and in The Politics of Joan of Arc published after 1940.

=== Illustrations ===
The cover illustration by Maxime Real del Sarte features Joan of Arc with a crown of thorns instead of the traditional halo. This imagery is rare, especially after her canonization in 1920.

== Bibliography ==
- Krumeich, Gerd (2010). "Maurras, Maurrasians, and Joan of Arc". Action Française: Culture, Society, Politics. Villeneuve d'Ascq: Presses universitaires du Septentrion. pp. 197–207. ISBN 9782757421451.
- Philippe Contamine (1992). "Joan of Arc in the Memory of the Right". History of the Right in France, volume 2, Culture. Paris: Gallimard, NRF essais. pp. 399–435 and 721–722. ISBN 2-07-072747-5.
