= Antoine de Buade =

French soldier and diplomat

- Born: 1567
- Died: 1626 (aged 58–59)
- Occupations: Soldier, diplomat
- Known for: Grandfather of Louis de Buade de Frontenac

Antoine de Buade (c. 1567-1626), seigneur de Frontenac, was a French soldier and diplomat.

Antoine de Buade belonged to an old family that had originated in Guyenne. In 1555 his father Geoffroy de Buade, lord of the small estate of Frontenac, had entered the service of Antoine of Navarre, governor of Guyenne. His mother was Anne de Carbonniere. At a young age Antoine de Buade entered the service of Antoine of Navarre's son Henri of Navarre, later to become Henri IV of France, as a personal equerry. The two men became close friends, and Antoine would accompany Henri on his amorous adventures.

Antoine de Buade married Anne de Secondat in 1583. In 1594 he was appointed governor of the castle of Saint-Germain-en-Laye. He assisted in negotiating the marriage of Henri IV to Marie de' Medici in 1600. In 1605 Antoine de Buade was master of the queen's house and master of the waters and forests of Laye. He was said to be avaricious, lending money at high rates of interest. Thus in 1606 he acquired the estate of Palluau by foreclosing on a mortgage. In 1607 this fief was made a barony.

In 1609 Antoine de Buade sold the Château de Pontchartrain and its estates to Paul Phélypeaux, secretary to Queen Marie de' Medici. Antoine's son Henri de Buade (1596–1622) was a playmate of the future king Louis XIII. Antoine arranged for Henri to marry Anne Phélypeaux in 1613. Her father and uncle were Raymond Phélypeaux and Paul Phélypeaux, both secretaries of state and highly influential men.

Antoine de Buade was made a Knight of the Order of Saint Esprit in 1619. In 1622 Louis XIII made the barony of Palluau a county. Henri de Buade was killed in 1622 during a military campaign. Antoine de Buade de Frontenac died four years later. Henri's son Louis de Buade de Frontenac later became Lieutenant General of the colony of New France in North America.
