= Paul Phélypeaux de Pontchartrain =

French statesman (1569–1621)

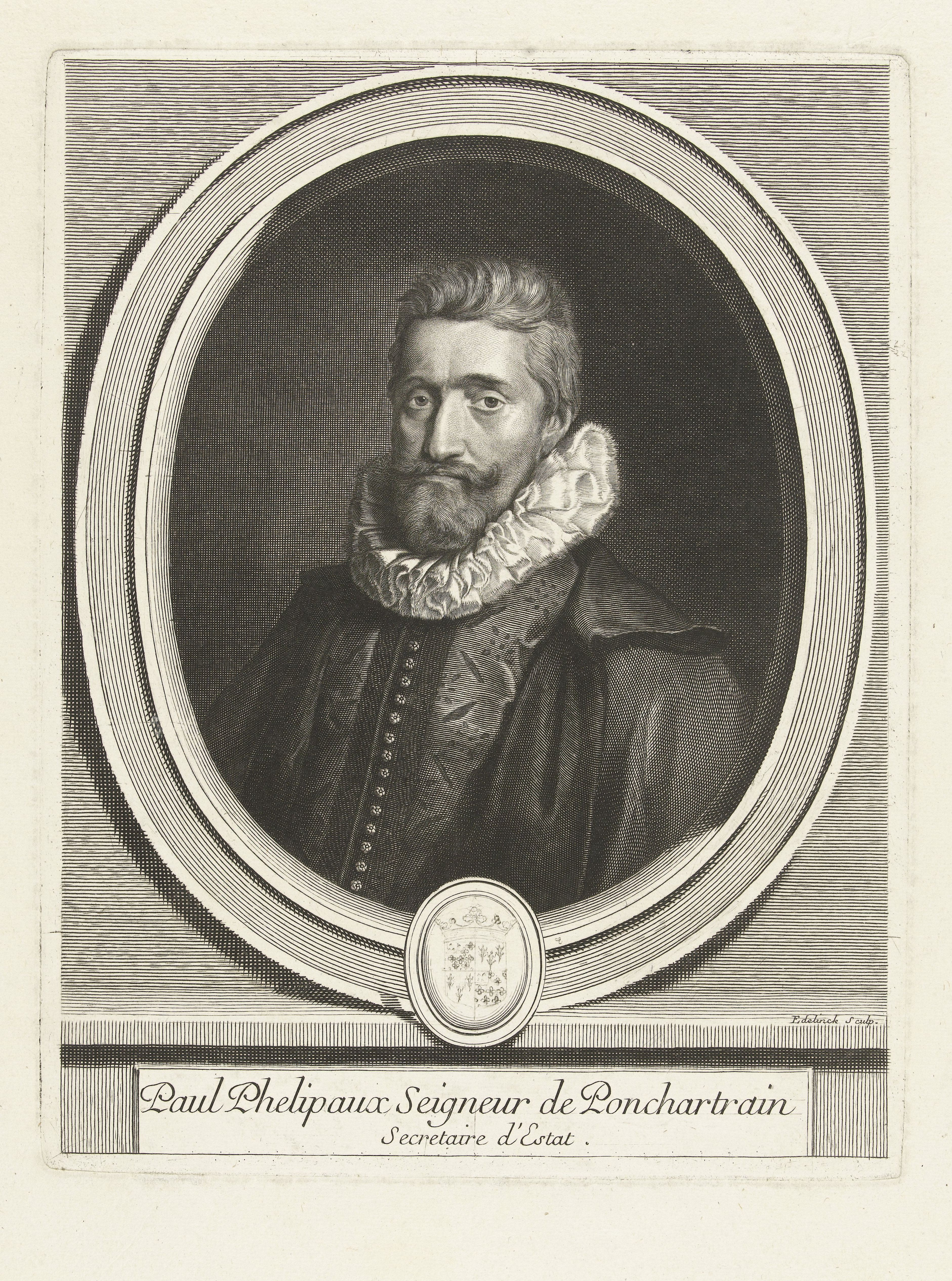
- Paul Phélypeaux de Pontchartrain
- Born: 1569; Blois, County of Blois, Kingdom of France
- Died: 21 October 1621 (aged 51–52); Castel-Sarrazin, Kingdom of France
- Occupation: Statesman
- Known for: Treaty of Loudun

Paul Phélypeaux de Pontchartrain (1569 – 21 October 1621), lord of Pontchartrain and Villesavin, was a French statesman. He served both Marie de' Medici and her son Louis XIII during a period of conflict between Catholics and Protestants in France, the French Wars of Religion. He was one of the negotiators of the Treaty of Loudun in 1616.

== Early years ==
Phélypeaux was born in Blois in 1569, son of Louis Phélypeaux, lord of La Cave and La Vrillière. His family could be traced back to the 13th century. His father had married in 1557 and had five sons and three daughters. The eldest, Raimond, lord of Herbault and Verger, became Secretary of the King's chamber in 1590. Paul was the fourth son, born in Blois in 1569.

In 1588, at the age of nineteen Phélypeaux entered the office of the minister Louis de Revol to study administration. After Henri III died in 1589, Phélypeaux continued to work for Revol, who was retained as Secretary of State under Henri IV. In 1594, Revol died but Phélypeaux remained in office under his successor, Nicolas de Neufville, seigneur de Villeroy. Phélypeaux and Villeroy became connected through marriage when Villeroy's grandson Henri married Phélypeaux's niece Marie, daughter of his brother Raymond. The bond between these two families remained strong into the reign of Louis XIV.

In 1600, Phélypeaux was named secretary to Queen Marie de' Medici. In 1605, he married Anne de Beauharnais, who died in 1653. They had four children, one boy and three girls, including Louis I Phélypeaux de Pontchartrain (1613–1685). (Note: His three daughters married Mangot de Villarceaux, Hodicq, lord of Marly and Claude Pierre, the first president of the parliament of Grenoble.) Paul Phélypeaux acquired the Château de Pontchartrain and its estates from Antoine de Buade de Frontenac in 1609, and became lord of Pontchartrain. In 1610, Henri IV made him Secretary of State for Protestant Affairs, saying he knew of nobody more worthy, faithful and capable. A few weeks later, Henri IV was assassinated.

== Statesman ==
Pontchartrain remained minister during the regency of queen Marie de' Medici. He thought only of the interests of the state, and never of his personal gain. Religious disputes had become a grave concern, threatening the peace of the kingdom. Phelypeaux took a pragmatic approach, trying to calm down passions on either side. He was one of the five deputies that the young king Louis XIII sent in 1616 to negotiate the Treaty of Loudun. The reconciliation of the queen mother with the young king was in part his work.

In 1621, the peace broke down with a Protestant uprising. The king went on campaign and Pontchartrain followed him. He feel ill at the siege of Montauban, and died at Castel-Sarrazin on 21 October 1621, aged 51 or 52. He left memoirs that cover the events from 1610 to 1620, giving a clear and simple account of the events he had witnessed and accounts of other events, a valuable historical source. His son Louis was 9 when he died. Raymond Phélypeaux assumed the position of Secretary of State for Protestant Affairs, saying that he would hold it until Louis came of age, but in fact the position remained in the La Vrillière side of the family.

== Bibliography ==
- Pontchartrain, Paul Phelypeaux de; Dumaih, Pascal (2007). Journal de la régence de Marie de Médicis. Éditions Paleo. ISBN 9782849092873.
