= Anne de La Grange-Trianon =

French aristocrat (1632–1707)

Anne de La Grange Trianon
- Countess of Frontenac
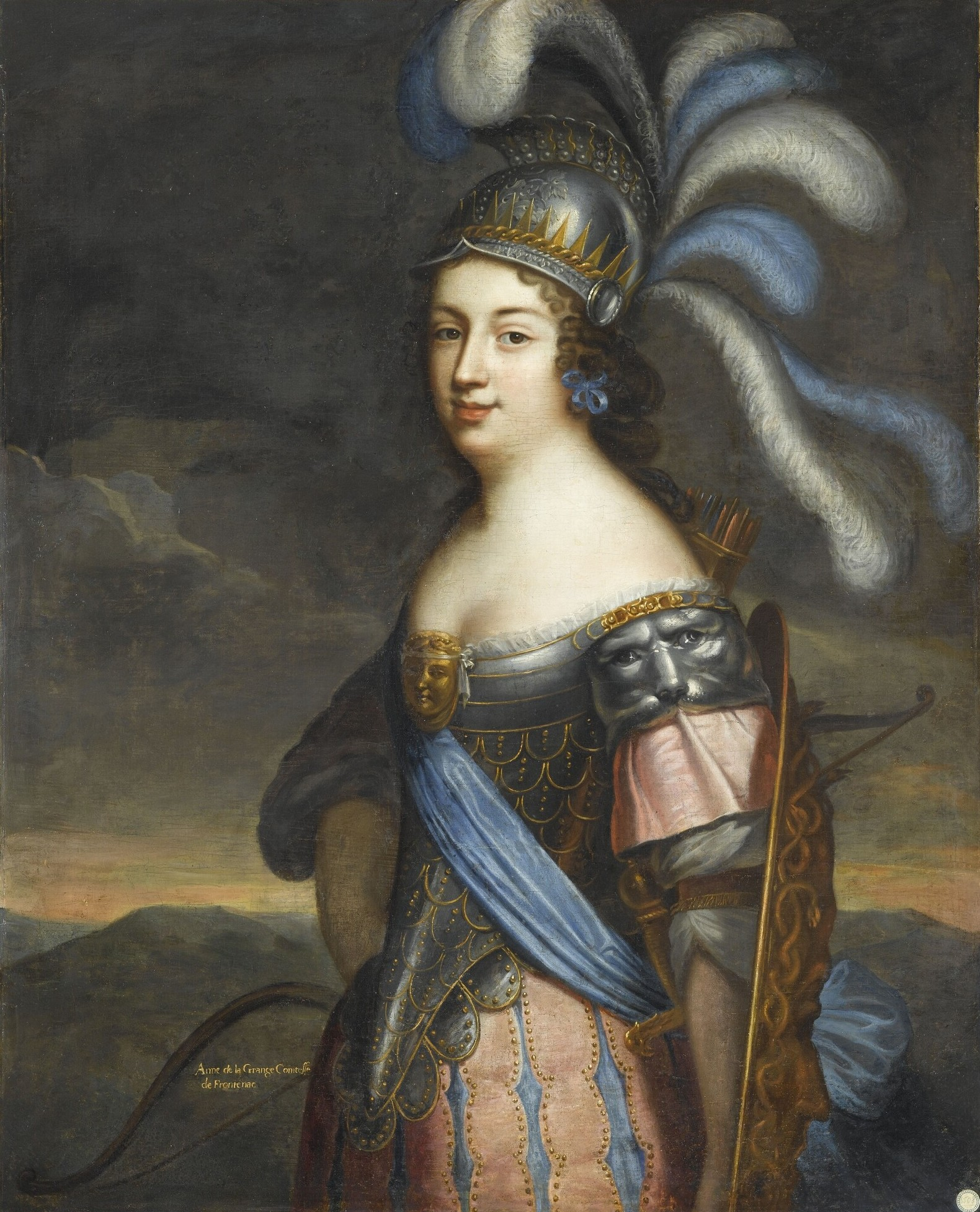
- Born: 1632
- Died: 20 January 1707 (aged 75); Paris, France
- Spouse: Louis de Buade de Frontenac
- Father: Neufville de la Grange

Anne de La Grange-Trianon (1632 – 20 January 1707) was a French aristocrat, spouse to Louis de Buade de Frontenac, twice Governor General of New France. Though she never set foot in Canada, La Grange played an important role in the development of the colony as Frontenac's ambassador in the court of Louis XIV.

== Early life and courtship ==
Anne was the daughter of La Grange-Trianon, Sieur de Neufville and lived under the care of a relative in the Quai des Célestins neighborhood of Paris, close to the family of Louis de Buade de Frontenac.

While little is known about her childhood, at some point during 1648, La Grange and Frontenac met and fell in love at the ages of 16 and 28, respectively. It does not appear that it was a relationship of purely romantic attraction, however. Frontenac was a career soldier from minor nobility who occupied a privileged position within the court and Anne was in line to inherit a sizable fortune from the estate of her deceased mother. La Grange, described as possessing a great beauty and wit, desired an opportunity to live a courtly life. Frontenac was in chronic debt. Married, the couple could provide one another with a path to the opportunities they both craved. More immediately, La Grange and Frontenac both possessed a notably impetuous nature which led to the couple's marriage against the wishes and without the knowledge of La Grange's family in the church of St. Pierre aux Boeufs on 28 October 1648.

De Neufville, unaware of the marriage, arranged for Anne to be sent to a convent as a measure to separate the young couple. He strongly disproved of the financially insolvent Frontenac as an inappropriate match for his daughter and her inheritance. When De Neufville found out about the secret wedding in April 1649, he was outraged, disowning his daughter and vowing to remarry so he could produce a new heir to his estate.

== Later life ==
The first intense period of romance, however, was short lived. La Grange had a "restless craving for excitement" which put her at odds with Frontenac's equally strong personality. She gave birth to a son, Francois-Louis in May 1651, but shortly afterwards parted company with Frontenac due to their difficulties cohabiting. In the aftermath of these events, La Grange entered the entourage of Madame Montpensier for a time, the granddaughter of Henry IV, famous for her role in the Fronde. La Grange enjoyed the favor of Montpensier for a time, following her through her exile and partaking of notable events such as breaking into the city of Orléans with a group of boatmen.

However, as with Frontenac, La Grange's energetic nature soon became at odds with her benefactor. Mademoiselle Montpensier began to suspect that La Grange was plotting against her and her family, and banished her from her private court. La Grange moved back in with Frontenac in a townhouse, and the pair began a campaign of petty annoyance when La Grange failed to enter back into Montpensier's favor. Attempts on her part to get the couple banned from the royal court failed, and they went out of their way to harass Montpensier whenever they could.

Meanwhile, La Grange and Frontenac were accruing massive amounts of debt through extravagant living. By 1664 they had accumulated 325,878 livres in debt, plus interest to creditors. In 1672, still deep in debt, Frontenac was appointed the Governor General of New France. This allowed him to escape the seizure of his property, but rumors abounded that he took the post to escape La Grange, who did not follow him to the colony. Despite the distance, La Grange and Frontenac benefited each other more during his terms as governor than at any other time. Frontenac's salary was paid directly to La Grange, and La Grange was a strong advocate for her husband at court. Frontenac very carefully built his legend by sending his diaries and accounts of his exploits to La Grange who would circulate them among the influential people in the French court.

Around the same time as Frontenac's appointment as governor in 1672, Francois-Louis had died in battle in Germany leaving the couple without an heir. Frontenac himself died in 1698. Anne de La Grange died on 20 January 1707.
