= Marthe de Vogüé =

French political activist

The Marquise de Mac Mahon
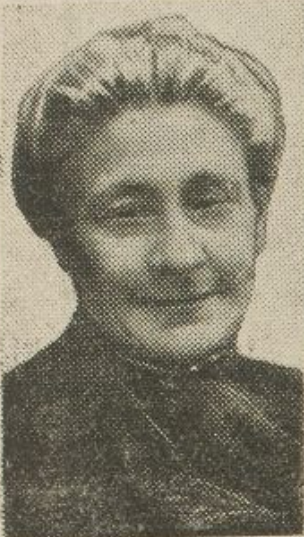
- Marthe de Vogüé, marquise de Mac-Mahon dans Excelsior du 13 mai 1911
- Born: Marthe Marie-Thérèse de Vogüé; 21 November 1860; Paris, Second French Empire
- Died: 9 June 1923 (aged 62); Paris, French Third Republic
- Known for: Leading female figure in the Action Française French Royalist movement.
- Spouse(s): Charles-Marie de Mac Mahon, Marquis de Mac Mahon
- Children: 1
- Father: Melchior de Vogüé

Marthe de Vogüé, Marquise de Mac Mahon (21 November 1860 - 9 June 1923) was a French political activist and monarchist. She was the leader of the Dames Royalistes from the 1900s until her death and was a prominent figure of the Action Française movement.

== Early and personal life ==
Marthe Marie-Thérèse de Vogüé was born in Paris on 21 November 1860, the second daughter of cousins Marguerite and Melchior de Vogüé. Her father was a diplomat, ambassador, archaeologist and prominent agrarian, president of the traditional and conservative Société des agriculteurs de France. Her mother died only days after her birth, and her father remarried in 1866 to Béatrix Claire Marie des Monstiers-Mérinville and had four further children, his second wife also dying as a result of childbirth.

On 22 June 1881, Marthe de Vogüé married Charles-Marie de Mac Mahon, (1856–1894) a retired military officer and a member of the senior branch of the de Mac Mahon family.

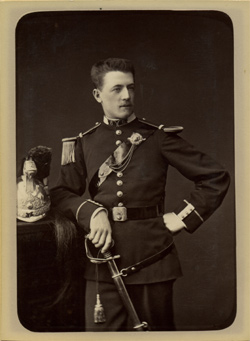
Charles-Marie de Mac Mahon

He was the grandson of the elder brother of Marshal Patrice de Mac Mahon, President of the French Third Republic from 1873 to 1879. The couple had a daughter, Henriette, who lived only five days (31 May 1882 to 4 June 1882).

She was widowed in 1894 and inherited the Château de Sully (Saône-et-Loire) from her husband. She commissioned significant building works, including the Renaissance Revival architecture south facade and the restoration of the moat. She also lived in a mansion on rue Fabert, in the 7th arrondissement of Paris.

== Involvement in l'Action Française movement ==
The Marquise de Mac Mahon supported a public school near her château where the students were taught by nuns, the Sisters of St. Joseph of Cluny. These nuns were expelled in August 1902, under an anti-clerical policy against schools run by religious congregations, passed into law of 1 July 1901 by the government of Émile Combes. The Marquise de Mac Mahon had opposed the removal of the teaching nuns to no avail, and this was reported by the press.

In 1903, she became one of the vice-presidents of a "comité central des dames royalistes de France" (committee of royalist ladies of France), founded the previous year on the initiative of Paul Bézine, head of the political office of the exiled pretender, Philippe d'Orléans, who claimed the title of Duke of Orléans. The committee was chaired by the Duchesse de Mortemart. de Mac Mahon took over the chairmanship on the latter's death in March 1904. She gave regular lectures and spoke at royalist congresses and meetings, alongside supporters of the Orleanist monarchist world, most of them men who professed to hate the French Republic. In December 1905, she was the only woman on the patronage committee of the royalist daily La Gazette (France).

From 1903, she chaired the Œuvre Notre-Dame de France, a charity founded in the name of the Duchess of Orléans, Archduchess Maria Dorothea of Austria, which distributed clothes to the poor in winter. Her charitable activities were inseparable from her anti-republican and Catholic convictions and embedded in her network of women's and aristocratic royalist committees.

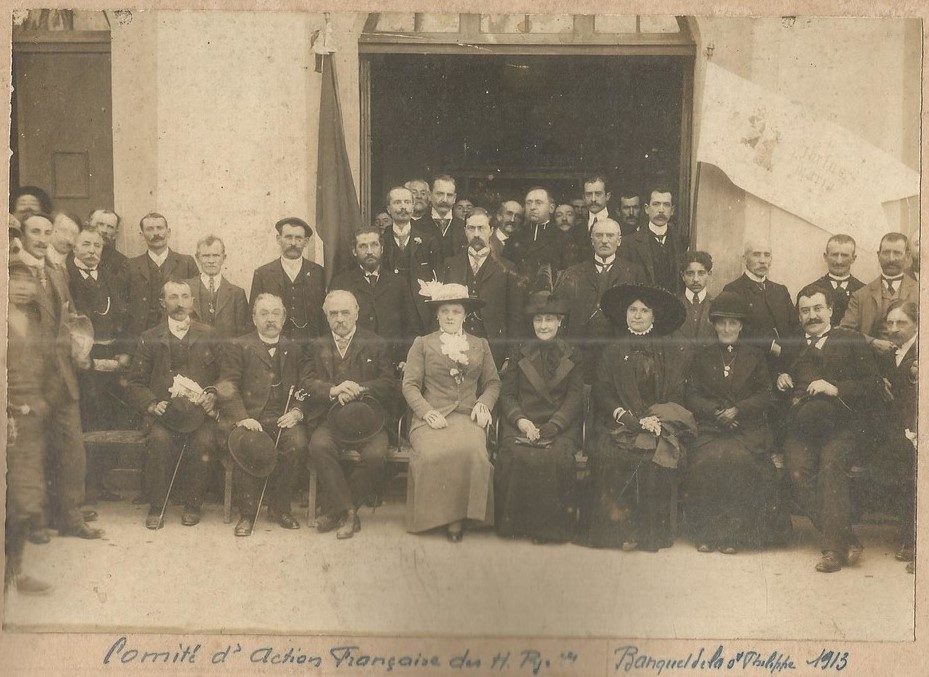
Marthe de Vogüé marquise de Mac-Mahon, at meeting of Hautes-Pyrénées Action Française committee, Tarbes, 1913 (second woman in centre).

In February 1906 she was one of the few women in the group of Catholics who physically opposed the inventory of the Basilica of Sainte-Clotilde in Paris and the church of Saint-Pierre-du-Gros-Caillou in the 7th arrondissement, following the passage of the 1905 French law on the Separation of the Churches and the State, which established state secularism in France. Article 3 of the act required that an inventory be made of all houses of worship previously supported by the government. The report in the Catholic newspaper L'Univers noted: "Mme la marquise de Mac Mahon, who has always shown remarkable courage and composure, refused to leave her place of honour in front of the main gate. “I am not afraid” she said “and I will defend our church like all the others”.

Her attendance at conferences built wider networks and led her to meet the leaders of the French royalist movement, Action Française (AF), including Charles Maurras and Henri Vaugeois. She attended AF meetings in the provinces, sometimes at the request of the aristocratic women who were members of the Notre-Dame de France charity. She campaigned for their common cause and from then represented them at many Action Française gatherings.

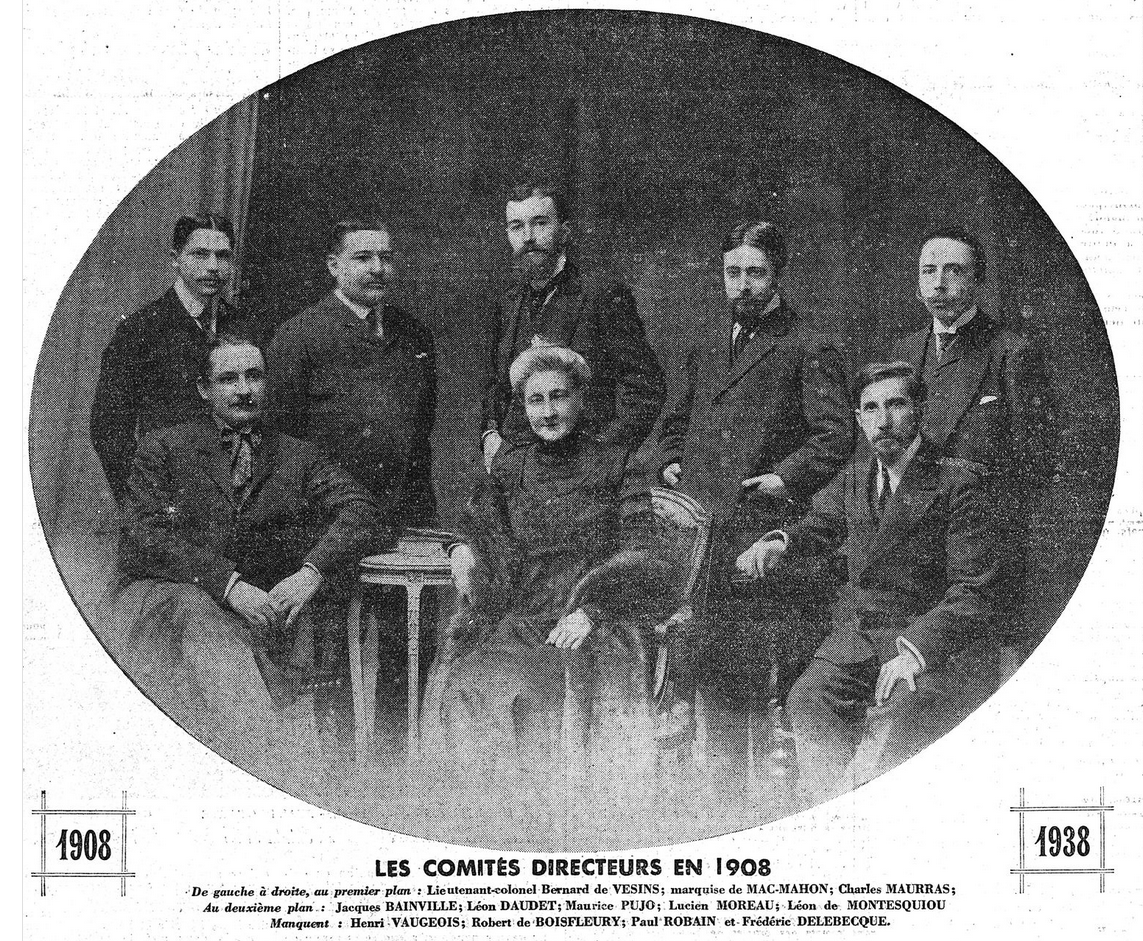
Steering committee of Action Française in 1908

Between September 1908 and August 1913, she took part in 96 meetings across Paris and the provinces. Her association of royalist ladies, rooted in Orleanist circles, was initially autonomous within Action Française. The Marquise sponsored the introduction of young royalist girls into the AF. In 1907 and 1908 she chaired meetings at her Paris home. She chaired the second session of the Action Française congress in December 1907.

de Mac Mahon's Catholic director of conscience was the Benedictine priest Dom Besse, with whom she kept up a regular correspondence. Dom Besse was very supportive of the AF. He wrote for Maurras' daily newspaper and encouraged women to defend the Catholic Church through the apostolate as well as politics. He justified de Mac Mahon's commitment to the AF, despite the criticism of some of the bishops and other Catholics who had rallied to support the French Republic at the request of Pope Leo XIII. He recommended that she act according to her conscience, even if it meant ignoring the bishops' recommendations.

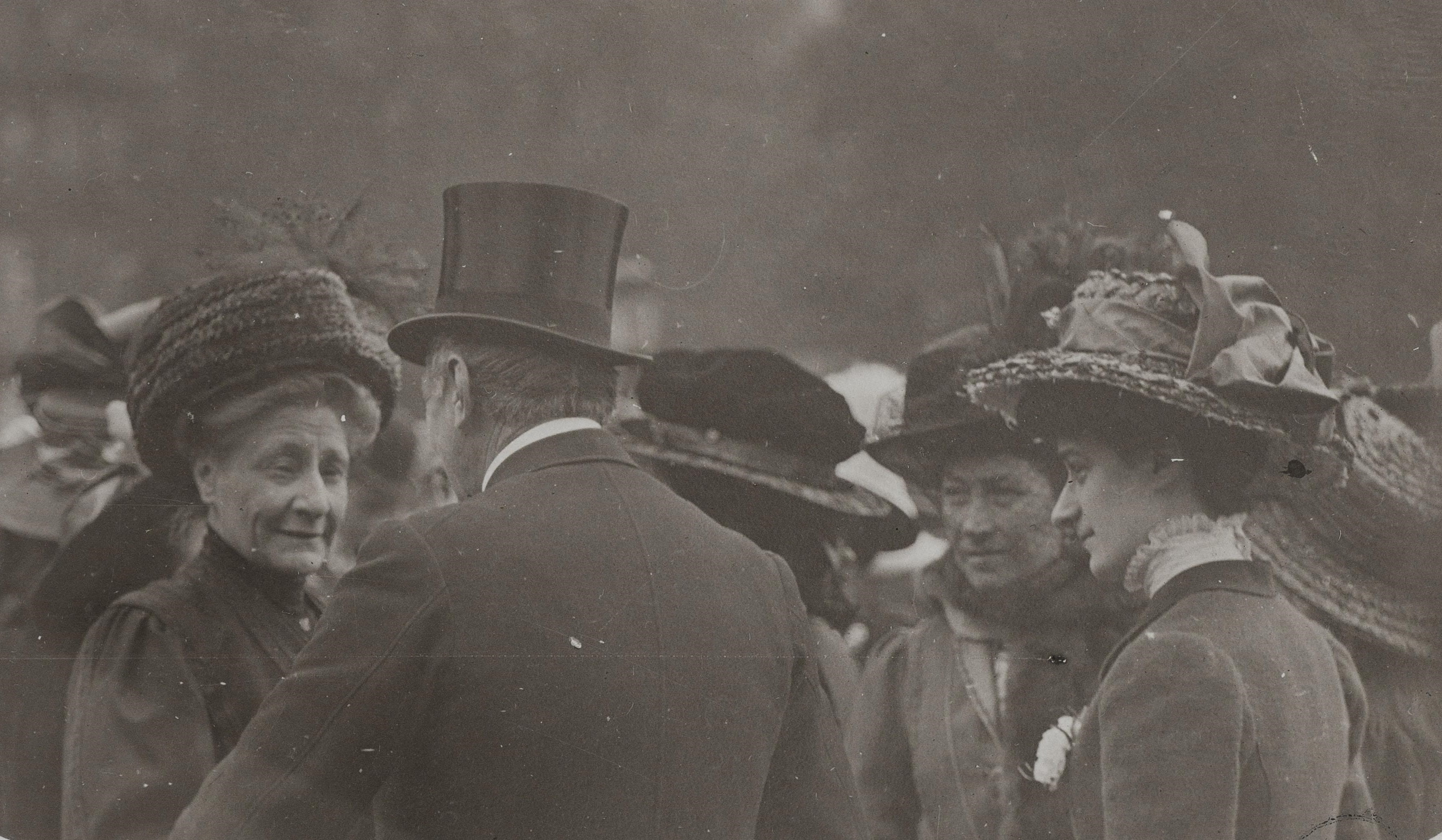
The Marquise de Mac-Mahon (left) during a tribute to Joan of Arc c.1900

In 1910–1911, the AF went through a crisis; it was temporarily disowned by the Orléanist pretender and the new head of the Duke of Orléans' political bureau, Henri de Larègle, turned out to be hostile to the organisation. The crisis led to resignations and splits within the royalist committees.

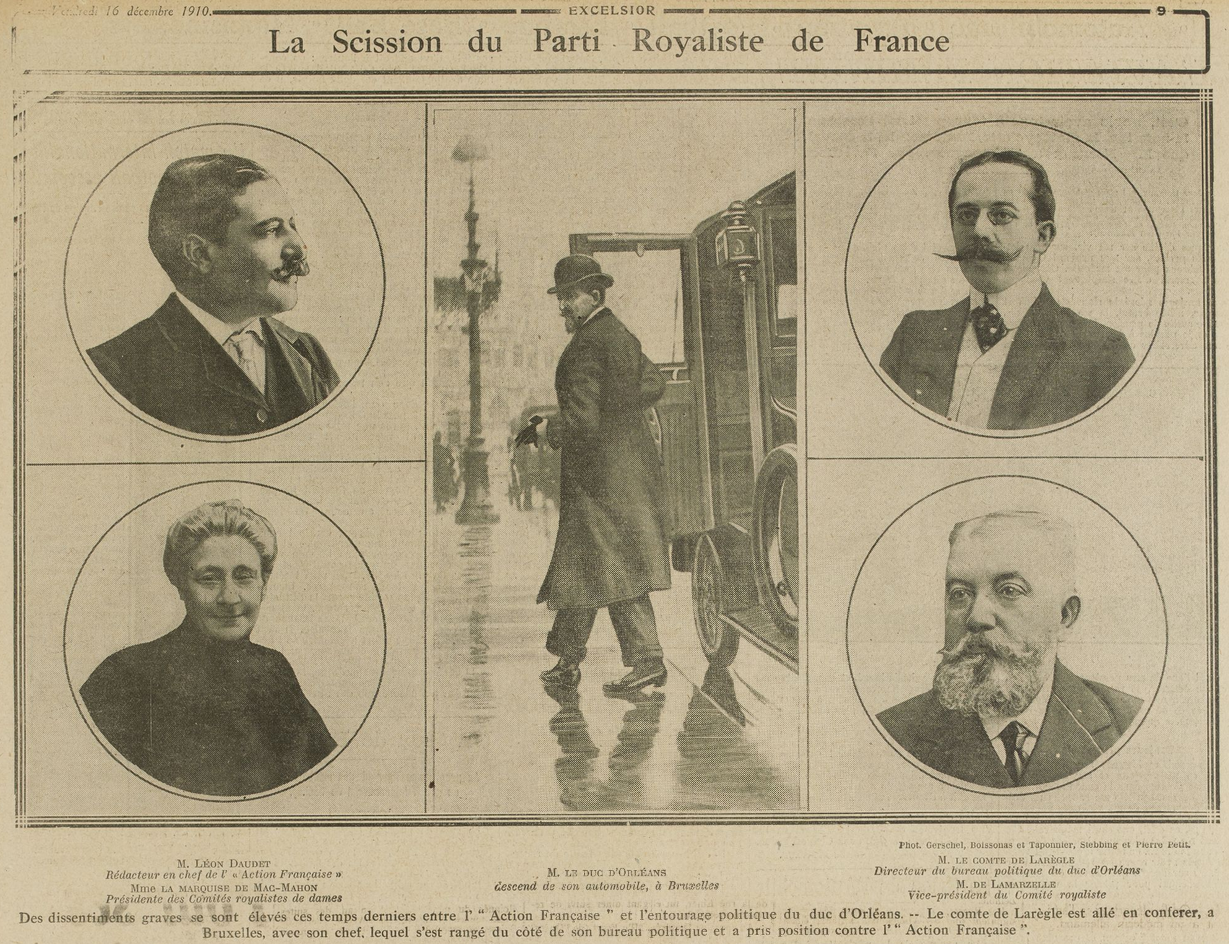
Léon Daudet, Marthe de Vogüé, Philippe d'Orléans, le comte de Larègle & M. de Lamarzelle in Excelsior December 1910

The Marquise de Mac Mahon remained loyal to the AF, in 1911 accepting the honorary presidency of the Dames d'AF. The AF emphasised that the committees of royalist ladies, hitherto under the authority of male royalist committees, were in crisis or in the process of being dissolved, and that some of them were joining de Mac Mahon. The Marquise, who was hostile to Larègle, was one of the people who intervened with the Duc d'Orléans, who decided to dismiss Henri de Larègle and once again support the AF. From then on, she was the leader of the Dames and Jeunes filles d'AF (Ladies and Young Girls of the AF), leading them in parades on Joan of Arc's feast day.

The committees of the Œuvre Notre-Dame de France which she chaired joined the AF. The AF presented her as president of the Association des dames royalistes d'Action française from 1910. She was honorary president of the closing banquet of the 1920 AF congress.

== Death and commemoration ==
Marthe de Vogüé, Marquise de Mac Mahon died on 9 June 1923 in Paris. Her funeral took place at the church in Sully, Saône-et-Loire; the funeral address was given by the parish priest of Sully, Abbé Paul Muguet, on 19 June 1923.

Following her death, Charles Maurras paid tribute to her in an editorial in the daily newspaper L'Action française. Léon Daudet wrote of her "gentle voice" and "persuasive power" in his memoirs. "Infatigable voyageuse, conférencière de talent, ... elle fut incontestablement la plus influente personnalité féminine de l’Action française. (A tireless traveller and talented lecturer ... she was undoubtedly the most influential female figure in Action Française).

== Bibliography ==
- Bruno Dumons, L’Action française au féminin: réseaux et figures de militantes au début du XXe siècle dans Michel Leymarie, Jacques Prévotat (dir.), L’Action française: culture, société, politique, Villeneuve d'Ascq, Presses universitaires du Septentrion, 2008 (Lire en ligne)
- Camille Cleret, «De la charité à la politique: l'engagement féminin d'Action française», dans Parlement[s], Revue d'histoire politique, No. 19, 2013, p. 17-29 ( Lire en ligne).
- Camille Cléret, Genre et engagement: les ressorts de l’engagement féminin d’Action française (années 1900-années 1930), En Envor, revue d'histoire contemporaine en Bretagne, n°8 ( Lire en ligne
- Léon Daudet, Souvenirs et polémiques, Paris, Laffont, 1992.
