= Buades =

Buades is a family name of Spanish origin. Notable people with the surname include:

- Abel Buades (born 1977), Spanish footballer
- Lucas Buadés (born 1997), French footballer
- Miquel Buades (born 1980), Spanish footballer

== See also ==
- Buade (disambiguation)
