= Frontenac, Gironde =

Frontenac
- Commune
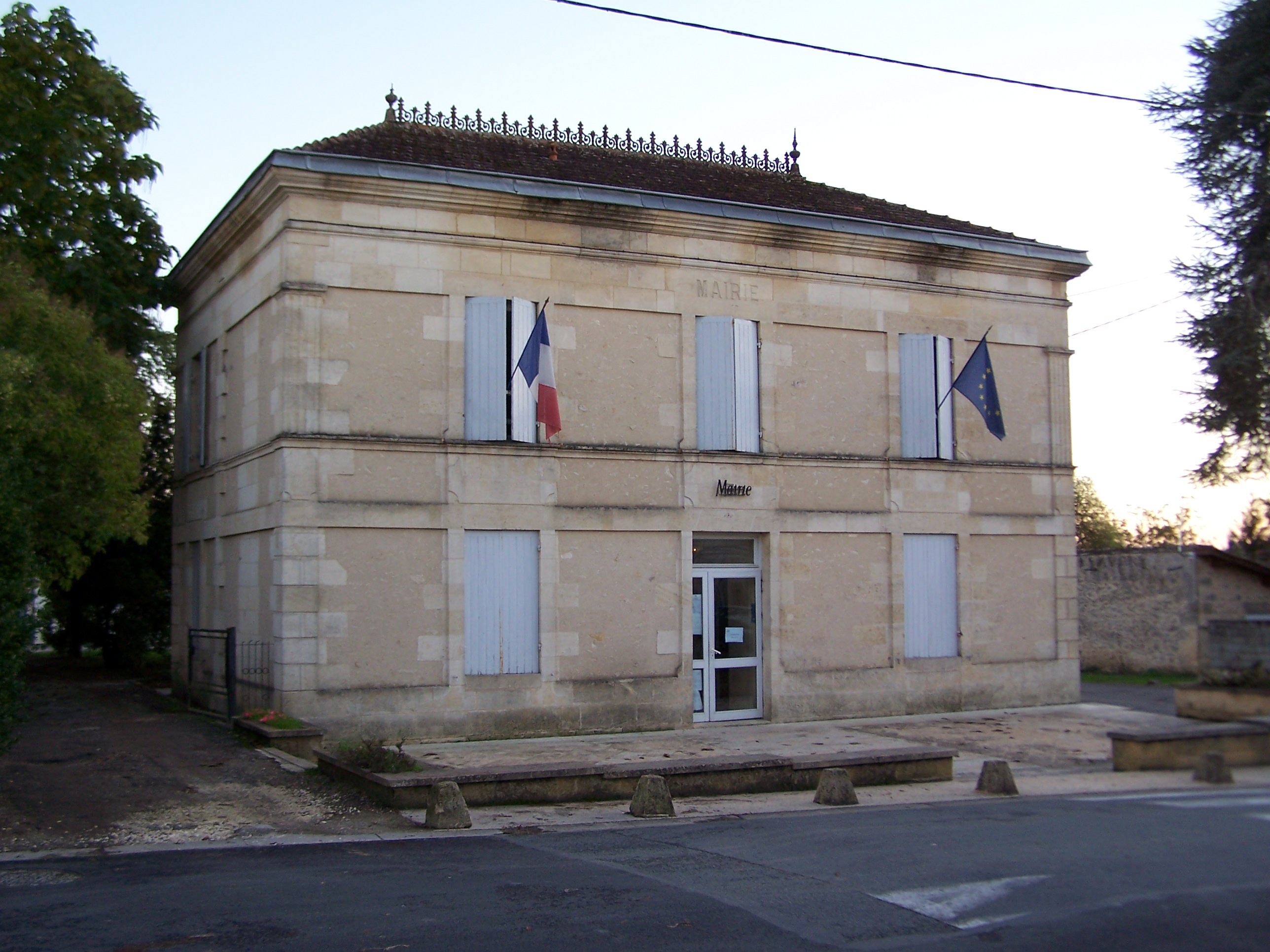
- Town hall
- Location of Frontenac
- Location within France Location within Nouvelle-Aquitaine
- Coordinates: 44°44′20″N 0°09′40″W
- Country: France
- Region: Nouvelle-Aquitaine
- Department: Gironde
- Arrondissement: Langon
- Canton: L'Entre-Deux-Mers

Government
  - Mayor (2020–2026): Josette Mugron
- Area^{1}: 14.4 km^{2} (5.6 sq mi)
- Elevation: 30 m (98 ft)
- Highest elevation: 105 m (344 ft)
- Lowest elevation: 24 m (79 ft)
- Population (2023): 803
  - Density: 55.8/km^{2} (144/sq mi)
- Time zone: UTC+01:00 (CET)
  - Summer (DST): UTC+02:00 (CEST)
- INSEE/Postal code: 33175 /33760
- ^{1} French Land Register data, which excludes lakes, ponds, glaciers > 1 km^{2} (0.386 sq mi or 247 acres) and river estuaries.

Frontenac (French pronunciation: [fʁɔ̃tnak]) is a commune in the Gironde department in Nouvelle-Aquitaine in southwestern France.

== Population ==
Historical population
Year	Pop.	±% p.a.
1968	729	—
1975	669	−1.22%
1982	640	−0.63%
1990	687	+0.89%
1999	650	−0.61%
2007	699	+0.91%
2012	766	+1.85%
2017	731	−0.93%
2023	803	+1.58%
Source: INSEE

== See also ==
- Communes of the Gironde department
