= Raymond Phélypeaux, Seigneur of La Vrillière =

French politician

Raymond Phélypeaux
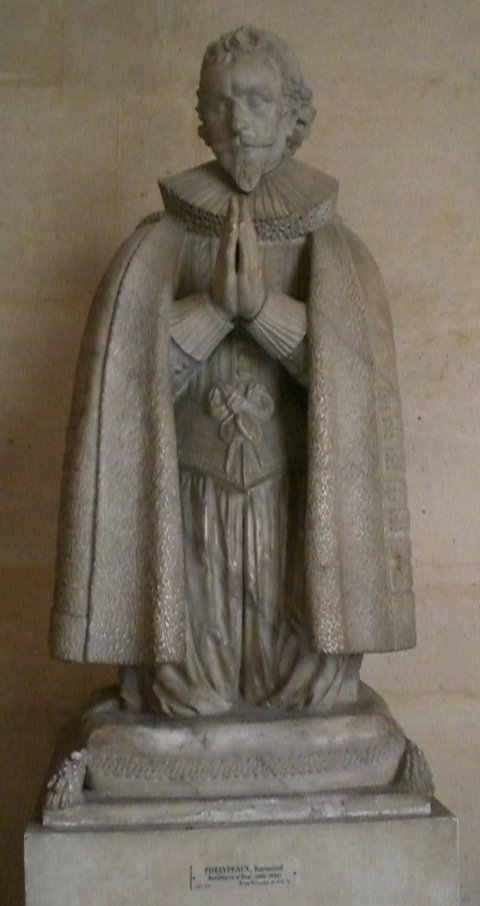
- Statue of Raymond Phélypeaux from the Château de Versailles
- Died: 2 May 1629
- Occupation: Administrator
- Known for: Secretary of State for Foreign Affairs

Raymond Phélypeaux, Seigneur of La Vrillière, seigneur d'Herbault and of La Vrillière (died 2 May 1629), was a French politician. Raymond Phélypeaux was son of Louis Phélypeaux, lord of La Cave and La Vrillière. His family could be traced back to the 13th century. His father had married in 1557 and had five sons and three daughters. The fourth son, Paul, was born in Blois in 1569.

Raymond, lord of Herbault and Verger, became Secretary of the King's chamber in 1590. He married Claude Gobelin, daughter of Balthazar Gobelin. They were to have four daughters and three sons, all of whom married well. He was made treasurer of the Épargne in 1599, in charge of the royal finances. His daughter Anne Phélypeaux married Henri de Buade de Frontenac in 1613. In 1620 she gave birth to Louis de Buade de Frontenac, who later became Lieutenant General of the colony of New France in North America.

Raymond's brother Paul fell ill at the siege of Montauban, and died at Castel-Sarrazin on 21 October 1621 at the age of fifty-two. Paul's son Louis was just nine years old when he died. Raymond Phélypeaux assumed Paul's position of Secretary of State for Protestant Affairs, saying that he would hold it until Louis came of age, but in fact the position remained in the La Vrillière side of the family. He became Secretary of State for Foreign Affairs from 11 March 1626 until his death on 2 May 1629. His son Louis Phélypeaux (1598–1681) inherited his estates.

== See also ==
- Phélypeaux
