= Pontchartrain Hotel =

Hotel in New Orleans, Louisiana

Coordinates: 29.9350°N 90.0796°W

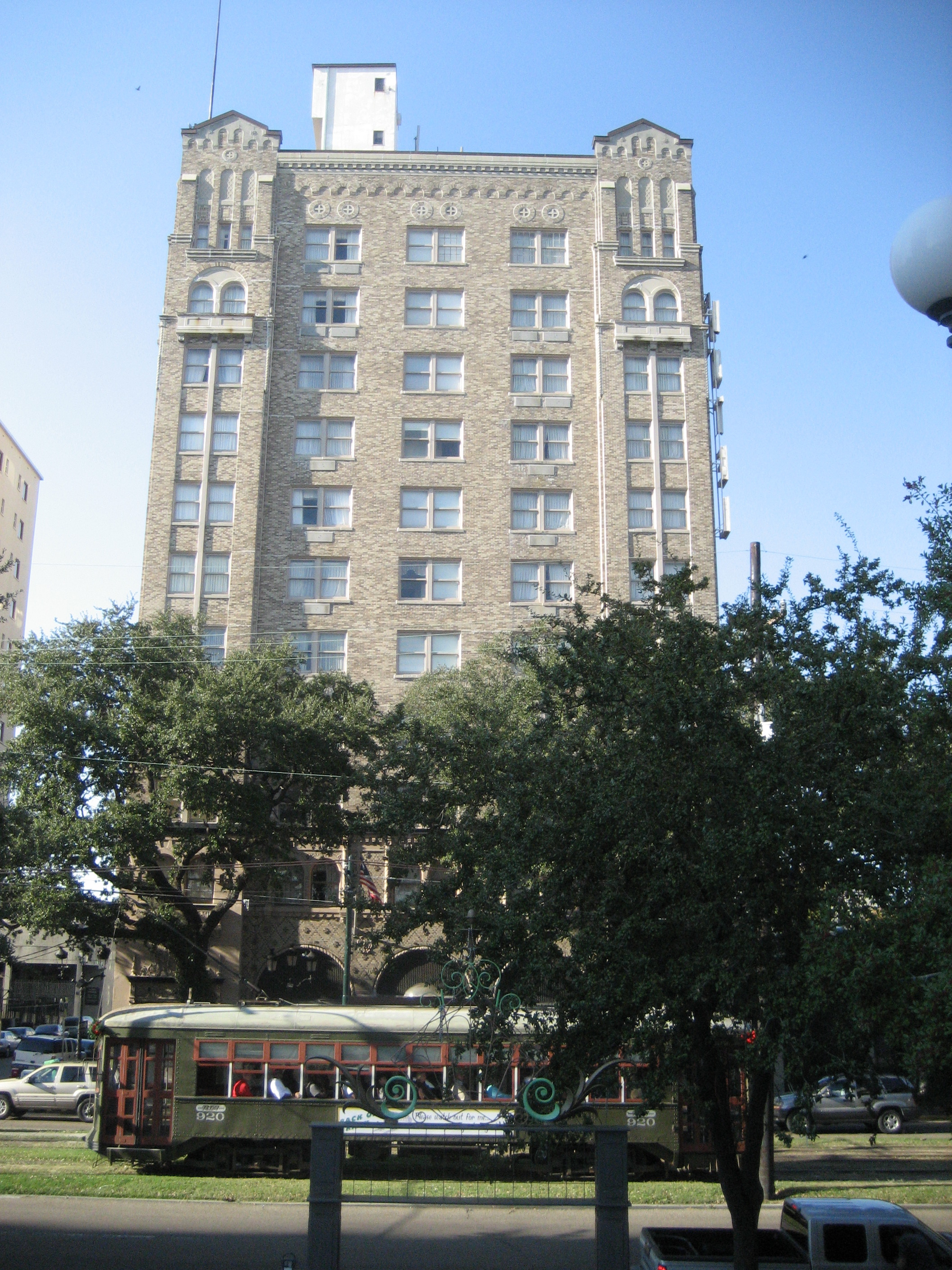
The Pontchartrain Hotel, with the St. Charles Streetcar running in front

The Pontchartrain Hotel is a historic hotel on St. Charles Avenue in Uptown New Orleans, Louisiana, United States.

== History ==
Albert Aschaffenburg Sr., a prominent New Orleans capitalist and real estate developer, planned to build the Pontchartrain Hotel next door to the Orpheum Theater, but died in 1918 before the development got underway. His son, E. Lysle Aschaffenburg, resurrected the concept in 1926, but chose a site on St. Charles Ave. and Josephine St., nearer to the city's residential districts. For approximately $1 million, the building was completed in 1927 and opened as a residential hotel. It did not take Lysle long to realize that there was not much incentive for New Orleanians to give up their homes to live in apartments and gradually converted most of the units for traditional hotel use, starting in 1941. The Pontchartrain shortly thereafter became a preferred destination for visitors; however, it always retained a small percentage of apartments for residents on an annual lease.

Lysle's son, Albert Jr., after serving overseas in WWII and living in New York to pursue a theater career, returned to New Orleans to join the family business and eventually take the helm of its operation. Realizing that to be considered a great hotel, a hotel must have a great restaurant, the Caribbean Room was created in 1948. Modeled after Chicago's famous Pump Room, the Caribbean Room, with its classical French approach in menu and service was at first not well received locally. The Aschaffenburgs retained the luxurious décor; however, they quickly changed the direction of the restaurant to become a mainstay of local Creole cuisine, with a warmer style of service. Through the years, the hotel's understated elegance and extraordinary service provided by its owner/managers appealed to sophisticated visitors that were part of the cognoscenti; it also was embraced by New Orleanians that felt the Pontchartrain was a physical manifestation of local traditional culture. New Orleanians were possessive about the Pontchartrain, its Silver Whistle Coffee Shop, the Caribbean Room and the Bayou Bar, and in turn, the hotel reflected their collective personality. Running the hotel became more of an avocation than a vocation for the Aschaffenburgs and Lysle often said (tongue in cheek) it was the easiest business in the world because the guests will tell you exactly how things should be done. Noted guests of the Hotel Pontchartrain include Cole Porter, Charles Laughton, Evelyn Waugh, Lord Litchfield, Mary Martin, Richard Burton, Joshua Logan, Henry Kissinger, Dame Margot Fonteyn, Rudolph Nureyev, James Beard, Tennessee Williams, (Staggs, 2005) Jose Ferrer, Rita Hayworth and Aga Khan (Frommer, 2007), The Doors (Densmore, 1990), and George H. W. Bush (who stayed there during the 1980 Republican National Convention in Detroit). Williams worked on his classic play A Streetcar Named Desire while staying at the Pontchartrain Hotel. (Staggs, 2005)

The Aschaffenburg family sold the Pontchartrain in the late 1980s. During the more than sixty years of the family's ownership and management, the Pontchartrain and its Caribbean Room restaurant received many honors: top rating in the Guide Julliard de Paris, Harpers & Queens 200 Best Hotels in the World, The IFMA Gold Plate award, Nation's Restaurant News Hall of Fame, a charter member of Preferred Hotels Worldwide, and it was a perennial Holiday Magazine award winner.

The 80-year-old hotel closed for extensive renovations in July 2007. In July 2008, it was reported that the building would be converted into luxury senior apartments. Demand for the apartments proved lower than expected, and in 2013, with demand for hotel rooms rebounding, it was announced that the Pontchartrain would return some of its 82 units to use as transient hotel rooms. The hotel's historic Bayou Bar reopened in February 2014.

In November 2014, the Pontchartrain Hotel was acquired by AJ Capital Partners, with Cooper Manning as a part-owner. It underwent another, more ambitious renovation, aimed at restoring it to its former grandeur and re-emphasizing its historic character. Its 106 guestrooms and suites were updated to appeal to a younger generation of travelers.

Celebrity chef John Besh and his staff were chosen to run the Caribbean Room and all of the hotel's dining operations. Besh's company left the Pontchartrain in January 2018. As of January 2018 all of the hotel's restaurants were operated by QED Hospitality.

The hotel reopened again on June 17, 2016, along with the Caribbean Room, Bayou Bar, and Silver Whistle coffee shop. Additionally, a new rooftop bar, Hot Tin, has been created on the fourteenth story of the hotel, overlooking the New Orleans skyline and Mississippi River. In April 2018, the Jack Rose restaurant opened in the space of the former Caribbean Room. In August 2019, Jack Rose was named "Best Hotel Restaurant" in the United States by USA Today.

== Awards and accolades ==
- Louisiana Landmarks Society 2017 Awards for Excellence in Historic Preservation
- Named one of Travel and Leisure's 2017 The Best New Hotels in the World
- New Orleans Eater Eater Awards 2016 - Design of the Year, Caribbean Room
- Best Hotel Restaurant in the United States (2019) by USA Today.

== See also ==
- Garden District, New Orleans
- Chateau de Pontchartrain

== Reference notes ==
- Hogan, C. Michael and Marc Papineau, Earth Metrics Incorporated, Phase I Environmental Site Assessment for the Pontchartrain Hotel, New Orleans, Louisiana, Report Number 10456, March 19, 1990
- Bernhard, Travels Through North America, During the Years 1825 and 1826, p 53, G. & C. Carvill, New York (1828)
- Staggs, Sam, When Blanche Met Brando: The Scandalous Story of "A Streetcar Named Desire", p 13, St Martins Press, New York, (2005)
- Densmore, John, Riders on the Storm, Delacorte Press, New York (1990)
- Frommer, New Orleans Travel Guide (2007)
