= Treaty of Loudun =

1616 agreement signed in France

Traité de Loudun
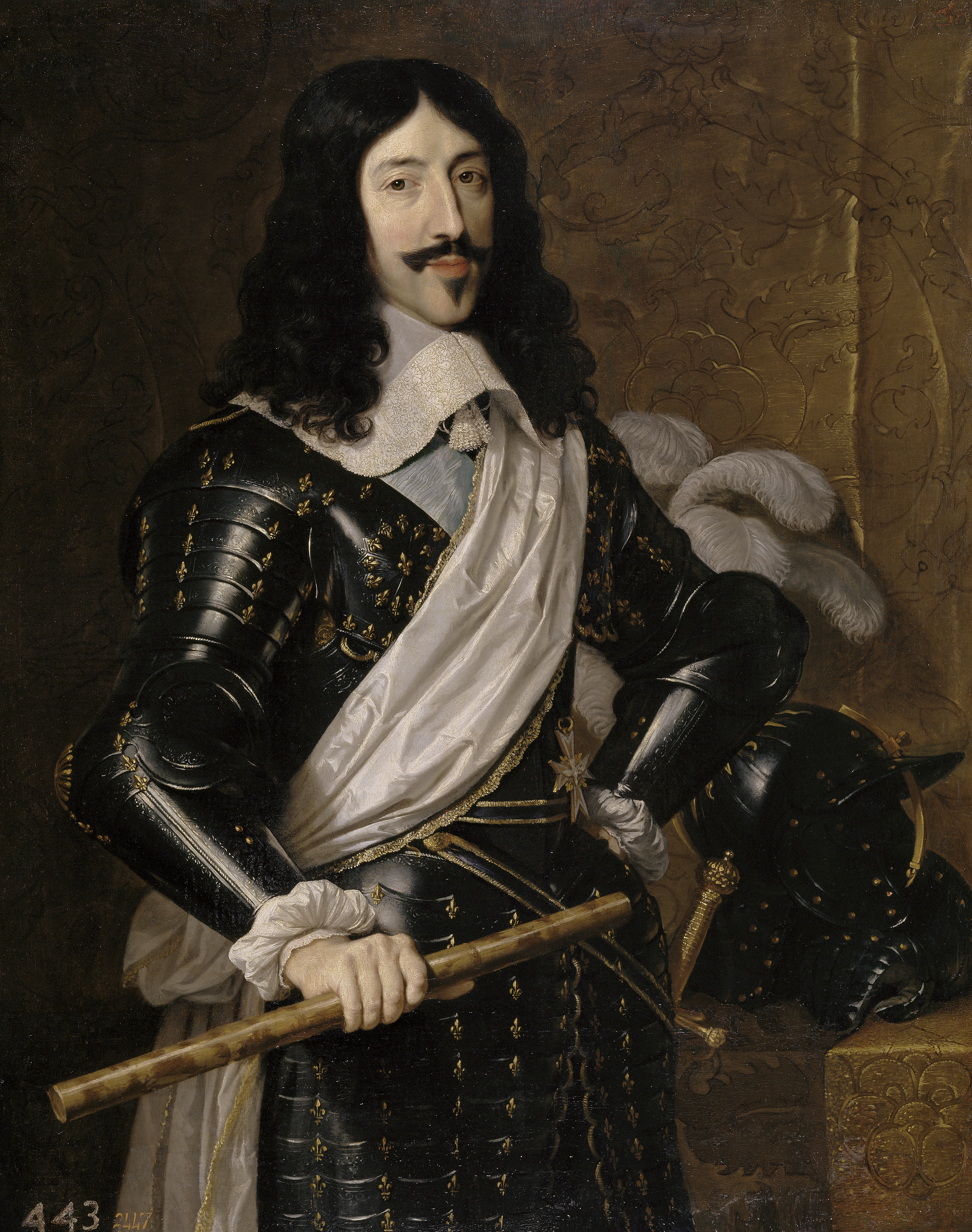
- A portrait of Louis XIII
- Signed: 3 May 1616
- Location: Loudun, France
- Signatories: Marie de Medici; Henry II de Condé
- Languages: French

The Treaty of Loudun was signed on 3 May 1616 in Loudun, France, and ended the war that originally began as a power struggle between Queen Mother Marie de Medici's favorite Concino Concini (recently made Marquis d'Ancre) and Henry II de Condé, the next in line for Louis XIII's throne. The war gained religious undertones when rebellious Huguenot princes joined Condé's revolt.

== Negotiations and terms ==
Negotiations between the court and Condé took place at Loudun between February and May and were conducted by the secretary of state, Nicolas de Neufville, Marquis de Villeroy. Père Joseph, a confidant of Armand-Jean du Plessis (at the time Bishop of Luçon and Queen Anne's grand almoner, later to become Cardinal Richelieu and first minister), also took part. The treaty was signed by Marie and Condé on 3 May 1616 and officially ended the revolts by many nobles in France at the cost of royal concessions and reparations to Condé and others. Based on the terms of the treaty, the Huguenots were allowed to unite their churches in France with those in Béarn. Moreover, the treaty granted amnesty to Condé along with others and made Condé head of the Council of State. Concini was removed as lieutenant-general of Picardy and governor of Amiens, while Condé received one and a half million livres.

== Aftermath ==
Concini retained considerable power as the favourite of Marie, and she eventually persuaded Condé to lend his support as well. Du Plessis, a supporter of Concini, was made conseiller d'état late in May, and Concini got Villeroy removed from his post as councillor in June (although this did not take full effect until 9 August). Concini was also made lieutenant-general in Normandy and governor of Caen and received a sweetener of 300,000 livres. He was widely unpopular for being a foreigner (an Italian from Florence), and his receipt of these emoluments again inspired many nobles to think of revolting.

Condé, meanwhile, forsook good governance in an attempt for increased personal power and the throne. After Condé told Concini that he could no longer protect him from the nobles, Marie decided to take steps to protect her favorite. Louis XIII went along with Marie's plan to arrest Condé, inviting Condé to a small chat and using palace guards to arrest him on 1 September 1616. Condé's followers then fled from Paris. Thus, the peace was broken, and war broke out again between the supporters of Concini and Condé's followers. The war ended with Louis XIII's coup d'état of 24 April 1617, when Concini was arrested, but reportedly resisted and was killed. Marie and her entourage, including du Plessis, were exiled to the Château de Blois on 3 May.

== See also ==
- List of treaties
