= Association of Royalist Ladies and Young Women =

French organization

- Association des dames et jeunes filles royalistes
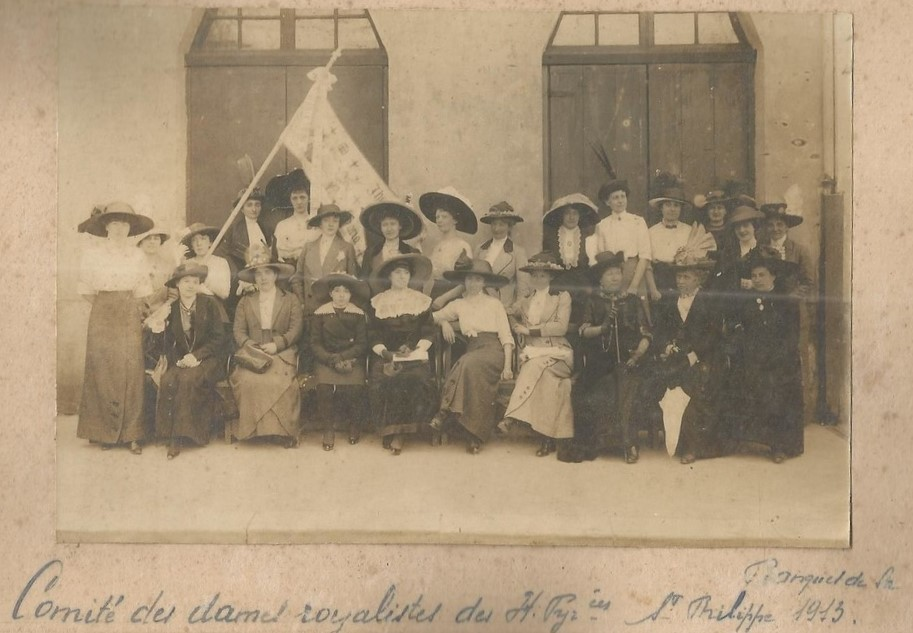
- The Committee of Royalist Ladies of Hautes-Pyrénées at the Saint-Philippe Banquet on 27 April 1913, in Tarbes
- Location: France
- Region served: France
- Affiliations: Action française

The Association of Royalist Ladies and Young Women (French: Association des dames et jeunes filles royalistes) was a dual structure that brought together female militants of the Action française. Distinguished women, whether married or widowed, were grouped within the Dames RoDames royalistes (Royalist Ladies) presided over by the Marquise de Mac Mahon starting in 1904. Younger women formed the l'Association des Jeunes Filles royalistes (Association of Royalist Young Women), created in April 1906.

== History ==
=== Foundation ===
The nationalist leagues of the early 20th century were not open to women, who thus organized themselves into independent groups. Married or widowed women were grouped in committees, while young women had their own organization.

==== Royalist Ladies and Action Française ====
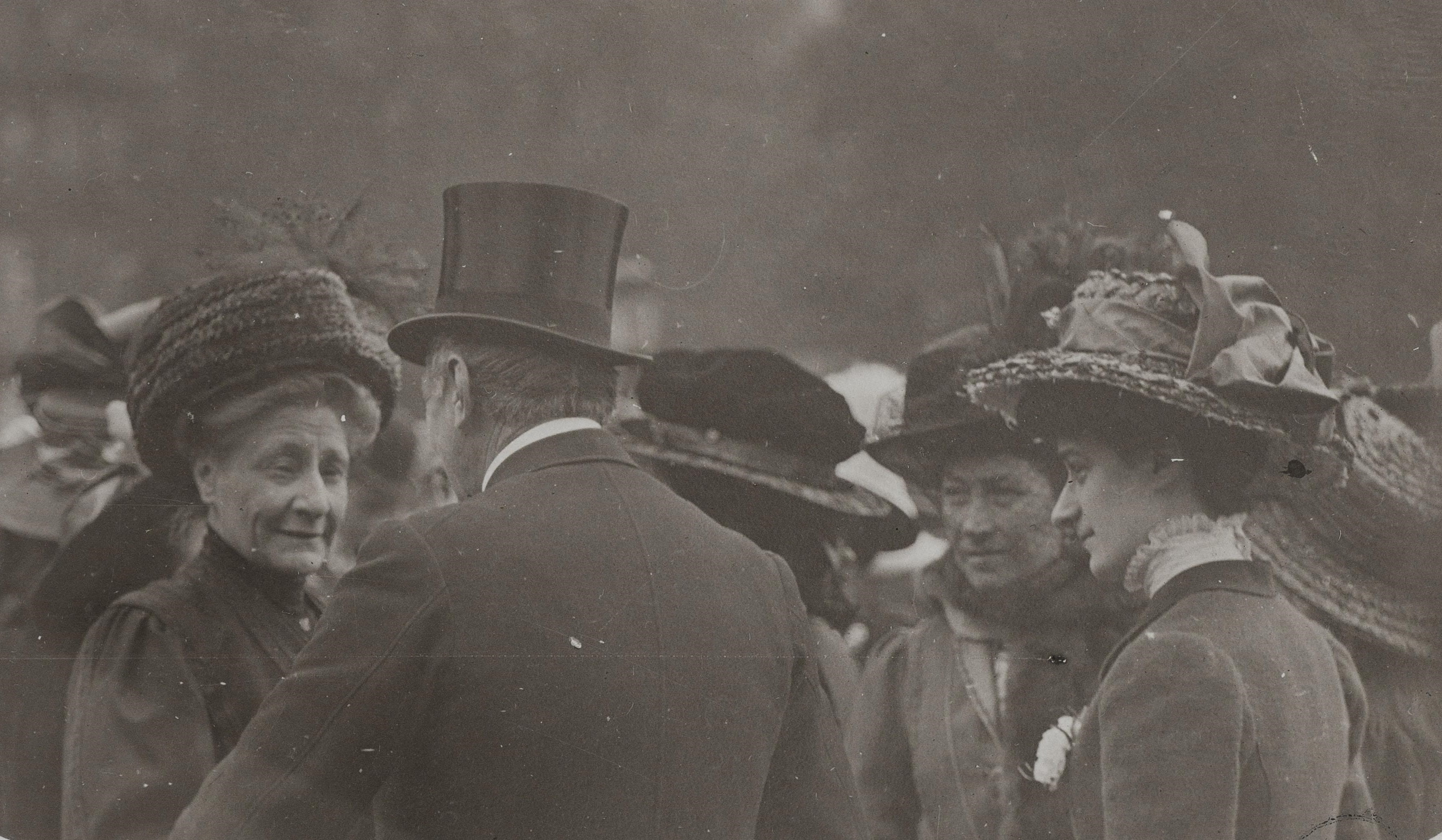
The Marquise de Mac Mahon (left) during a tribute to Joan of Arc around 1900

The Association of Royalist Ladies and Action Française was, according to historian Camille Cleret, the successor to the Royalist League of Ladies, founded in 1904 to oppose the law suppressing congregational education.

==== Association of Royalist Young Women ====
In a bulletin of the Action française League published in July 1906, sixteen young women expressed their intention to organize:

Sir, having each personally joined the Action Française League, we now wish to bring you our collective membership. Women still hold the spindle and the needle, but today everyone, including women and young girls, must fight against falsehood and serve the truth.

— Action Française, Bulletin de la Ligue, July 1906.

This small group laid the foundation for the Association of Royalist Young Women of Action Française. Its charter stated:

The association of Royalist Young Women is intended to unite all young women who wish to contribute to the work of national revival undertaken by Action Française.

According to Léon Daudet, the association originated from the efforts of Mlle de Montlivaut in 1905 in the Loir-et-Cher region and Parisian activists who read L'Action française. Formed in 1906 and sponsored by the Marquise de Mac Mahon, the association held its first meeting in 1907 and reportedly had 1,500 members by 1908.

=== Uneven Development ===
In 1904, the Marquise de Mac Mahon addressed an audience of 300 women in Poitiers. Efforts were made by Mlle de Clisson to establish a local chapter for young royalist women in Poitiers. Other regions, such as Provence, remained predominantly male despite the Marquise's visits in 1906 and 1909.

=== Condemnation of Action Française by the Papacy ===
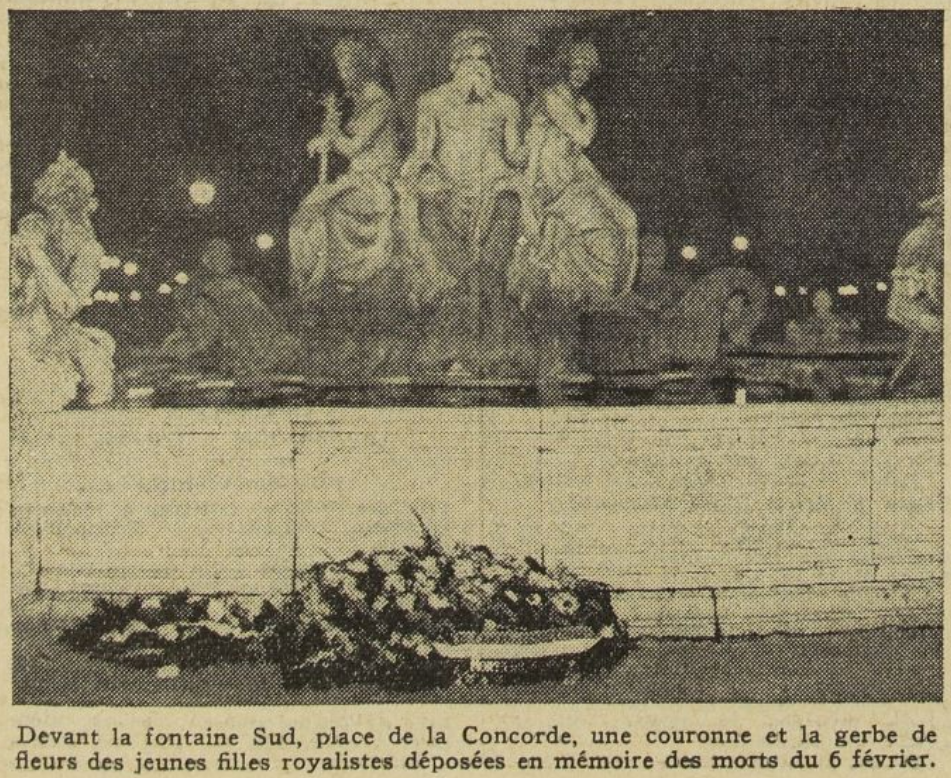
Floral tribute by the Association of Royalist Young Women at Place de la Concorde on February 6, 1935.

The papal condemnation of Action Française in 1926 damaged the Mayenne chapter of the royalist women's section. Some members prioritized loyalty to the Church over their royalist engagement, while others persevered. In 1928, royalist young women in Laval were denied a Mass for Louis XVI's memory but succeeded in obtaining one by 1930, albeit discreetly.

== Ideology ==
=== Conservatism ===
Historian Camille Cleret describes the members’ vision as conservative yet politically engaged, advocating for women's involvement in restoring traditional roles within a non-democratic monarchy.

Women must not mimic men. The masculinization of women would be a disaster for civilization and for women themselves.

— Léon Daudet

== Activities ==
The Royalist Ladies and Young Women engaged in various forms of propaganda and charity work, including organizing fairs, distributing publications, and hosting religious pilgrimages.

== Structure ==
Leadership positions were held exclusively by noblewomen listed in the Annuaire des Châteaux. From 1904 to 1923, the association was led by the Marquise de Mac Mahon, succeeded by her relatives and associates.

== Sources ==
- Cleret, Camille (2013). "De la charité à la politique: l'engagement féminin d'Action française". Parlement[s], Revue d'histoire politique: 17–29. doi:10.3917/parl.019.0017.
- Dumons, Bruno (2008). L'Action française au féminin: Réseaux et figures de militantes au début du XXe siècle. L'Action française: culture, société, politique. Presses universitaires du Septentrion.
