= Henri de Buade =

- Born: 1596
- Died: 1622 (aged 25–26)
- Occupation: Soldier
- Known for: Father of Louis de Buade de Frontenac

Henri de Buade de Frontenac (1596–1622) was a French aristocrat during the age of Louis XIII, best known as the father of Louis de Buade de Frontenac, the future Lieutenant General of the colony of New France in North America.

Henri de Buade de Frontenac was born in 1596, son of Antoine de Buade and Anne de Secondat. His father, from a family that originated in Guyenne, was an intimate of King Henry IV of France As a child Henri de Buade was a playmate of the future king Louis XIII. It is said that one day when King Henri IV was in poor health, he had the two boys stage a fight on his bed to amuse him.

In May 1612 King Louis XIII granted him some land behind the Louvre Palace in Paris, then used only for a hen house, on which he could build a house. His father Antoine arranged for Henri to marry Anne Phélypeaux in 1613. Her father and uncle were Raymond Phélypeaux and Paul Phélypeaux, both secretaries of state and highly influential men. His son, Louis de Buade, Comte de Frontenac et de Palluau, was born in 1620. King Louis XIII acted as godfather to the boy, who was named after him.

Henri de Buade became a colonel in the Regiment of Navarre. He was killed in 1622 during a military campaign. His heart was removed, sealed in a lead box, and buried in the church at Palluau. Henri's son Louis later became Lieutenant General of the colony of New France in North America.
