= Fort Pontchartrain a Wyndham Hotel =

American skyscraper hotel

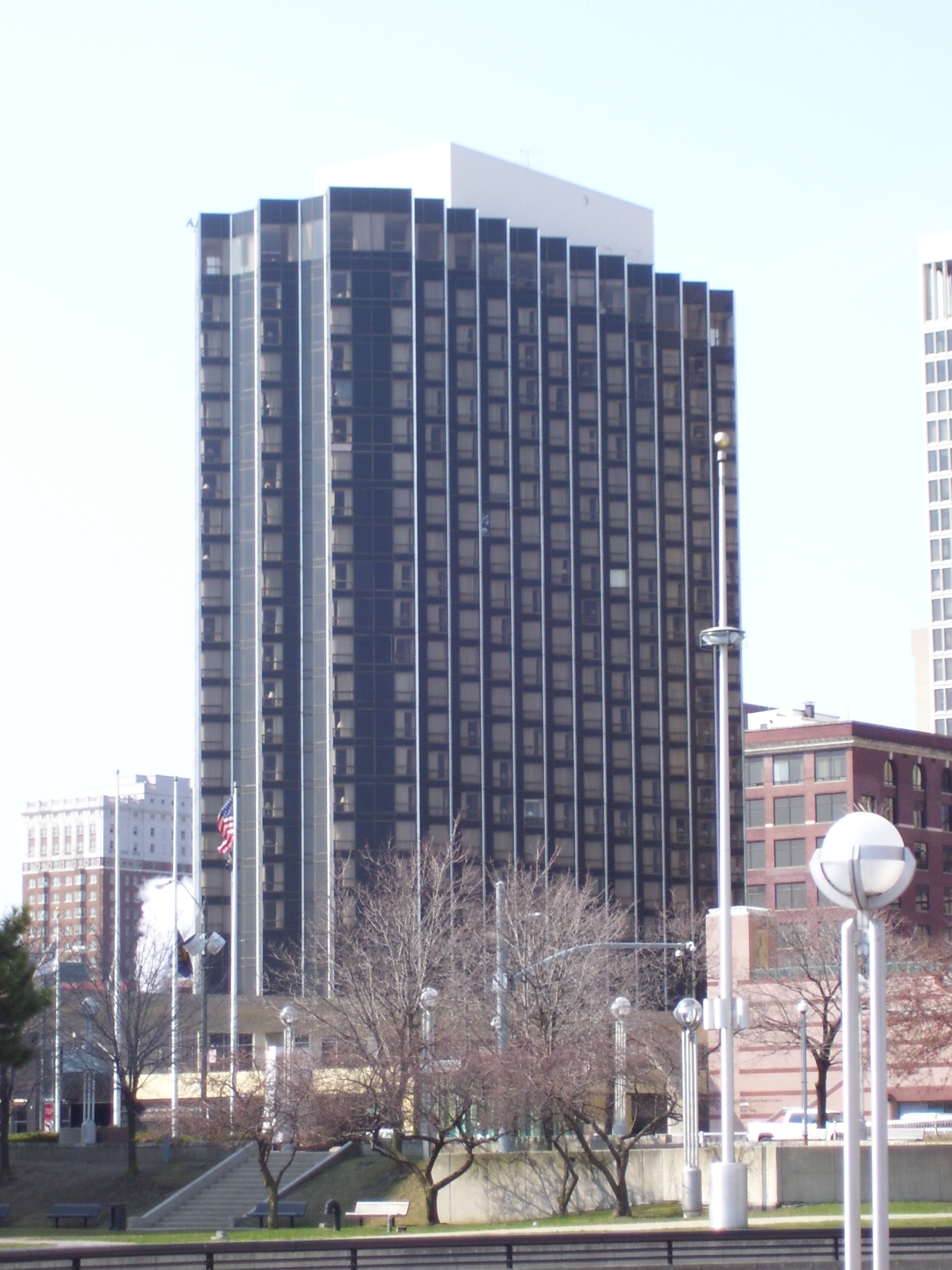
- Interactive map of the Fort Pontchartrain a Wyndham Hotel area

General information
- Location: Detroit, Michigan, 2 Washington Blvd
- Coordinates: 42.328°N 83.0476°W
- Opening: July 24, 1965
- Owner: Thy collection llc
- Operator: Wyndham Hotels & Resorts

Height
- Height: 75 m (246 ft)

Technical details
- Floor count: 25

Design and construction
- Architects: King & Lewis

Other information
- Number of rooms: 367
- Public transit: Financial District; Congress Street; DDOT 3, 6, 9, 40, 52; SMART FAST Michigan 261, Woodward 461, 462, Gratiot 561

Website
- Official website

The Fort Pontchartrain a Wyndham Hotel, is a 367-room, 25-story high-rise hotel opened in 1965, adjacent to former Cobo Hall, now Huntington Place in Downtown Detroit, Michigan.

== History ==
The Plaza Land Company was established in 1955 to construct a modern hotel on a site adjacent to the planned Convention Hall and Exhibits Building. In 1956, the company announced a partnership with Conrad Hilton to construct a $24 million hotel, to be named the Pontchartrain Hilton. However, the Hilton Hotels Board vetoed the deal in 1960. The Plaza Land Company then turned to Samuel and Aaron Gershenson's Downtown Investment Company, which assumed control of the project.

King & Lewis designed the Hotel Pontchartrain in the modern architectural style, with contemporary French interiors, and employing angular bay windows which provides every room with views of the International Riverfront and the city. The Pontchartrain was originally intended to have a twin tower, on the other side of the plot, but it was never built. The Hotel Pontchartrain was dedicated on July 24, 1965, the 264th anniversary of the founding of Detroit. It was built on the site of Fort Pontchartrain, Detroit's first permanent European settlement, built in 1701, which later became known as Fort Detroit. The hotel is named for the fort and for an earlier Hotel Pontchartrain, which was located on Cadillac Square at Woodward Avenue, before it was demolished in 1920.

George H. W. Bush stayed at the hotel during the 1980 Republican National Convention. In 1985, the Crescent Hotel Group, a subsidiary of Lincoln Savings & Loan purchased the Hotel Pontchartrain for $19.5 million. Lincoln S&L Chairman Charles Keating soon thereafter arranged to buy the hotel outright from the company and set up the Hotel Pontchartrain LP, controlled by Keating, his family, and executive contacts. The sale was financed by a series of ethically questionable loans from Lincoln and its subsidiaries and totaled $38 million. U.S. Senator Donald W. Riegle (D-MI) later cited his arrangement as his basis for considering Keating a constituent during his involvement in the Keating Five scandal.

The hotel fell into receivership and was put under the control of the Resolution Trust Corporation, a government-owned asset management company designed to liquidate the holdings of failed savings and loans. The RTC contracted with Radisson Hotels to manage the hotel, and it became the Radisson Hotel Pontchartrain in 1990. In 1994, the hotel was sold to Pontchartrain Hotel Group, L.L.C.. The sale closed on May 24, 1994, and the new owners severed the management contract with Radisson that day, returning the hotel to its original name. Radisson then sued the new owners for breach of contract.

On March 30, 2001, the hotel reopened as the Crowne Plaza Detroit Pontchartrain, following a major renovation. In 2006, Shubh LLC purchased the hotel and it underwent a $35 million renovation, reopening as the Sheraton Detroit Riverside in November 2007. Within a year, however, Sheraton revoked its branding agreement due to poor management and the property became the Detroit Riverside Hotel. On June 26, 2009, the Wayne County Circuit Court appointed David Findling of The Findling Law Firm, PLC, as receiver of the hotel. The hotel was again shuttered in August 2009 when Mutual Bank of Harvey, Illinois foreclosed on the mortgage. After the Illinois Department of Financial and Professional Regulation banking division declared Mutual Bank insolvent, United Central Bank of Garland, Texas, acquired Mutual Bank's assets.

In March 2012, the hotel was sold by the receiver, David Findling, to Mexico-based developer Gabriel Ruiz, who planned to renovate it and entered into a management agreement with Crowne Plaza Hotels & Resorts, a division of InterContinental Hotels. The hotel reopened on July 17, 2013, as the Crowne Plaza Detroit Downtown Convention Center. Its name was later modified to Crowne Plaza Detroit Downtown Riverfront. Due to the quality of the renovation, the hotel was awarded Development of the Year by InterContinental Hotels Group in 2013. Ruiz announced plans to reopen the iconic "Top of the Pontch" restaurant and build the second tower that was included in the hotel's original plan. On July 23, 2021, the hotel left IHG Hotels and was renamed Fort Pontchartrain a Wyndham Hotel.
