= Law of 7 July 1904 =

Law of July 7, 1904
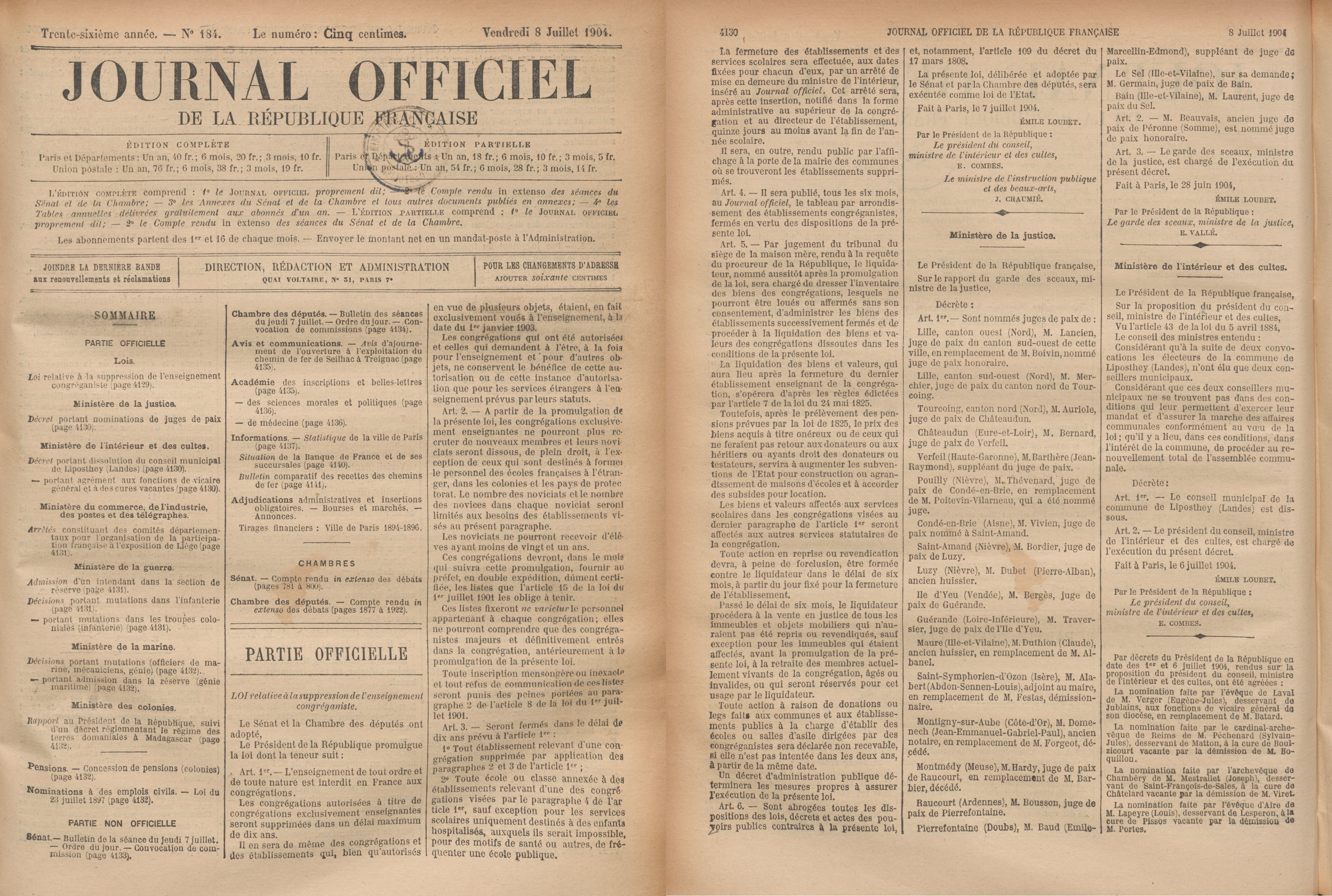
- Text of the law published in the JoRf on July 8, 1904.
- Date: July 7, 1904
- Location: France

The Law of July 7, 1904, also known as the Combes Law, officially the Law on the Suppression of Congregational Teaching, was a law of the French Republic that banned members of religious congregations and congregations themselves, even those authorized, from teaching in France and mandated the liquidation of their properties.

This law led to the reorganization of denominational education by the secular clergy and the establishment of numerous private schools staffed by lay or secularized personnel. It significantly altered the educational landscape and strengthened the secularization of education in France.

== Context ==
After the expulsion of religious congregations in 1880, some congregations reconstituted themselves, prompting an anticlerical reaction from the French Third Republic. Under Pierre Waldeck-Rousseau's government (1899–1902), this reaction was relatively moderate but became more militant under Émile Combes (1902–1905). Under Combes, who described his policies as a "secular campaign," the effort to curb the Catholic Church's influence in education reached its peak.

Combes diverged from Waldeck-Rousseau's approach, which primarily sought state control over congregations. Instead, Combes aimed to exclude them. In November 1903, he announced plans for a law banning members of religious congregations from teaching, even in authorized congregations, and submitted a legislative proposal in December. A commission led by Ferdinand Buisson was established, and animated debates took place between February 29 and March 28, 1904. The 1904 law, which prevented Catholic monks from teaching in France, contributed to the growth of the French colonies, as a large number of these monks went into exile and taught, particularly in the Ottoman Empire.

== Content ==
The law's title explicitly outlines its purpose: "Law on the Suppression of Congregational Teaching." It aimed to compel teaching brothers to secularize or cease teaching. Specifically, any application to open a congregational school became inadmissible.

Notable articles include:

Article 1: Teaching of any kind is forbidden in France to congregations. Congregations authorized exclusively as teaching bodies will be suppressed within a maximum of ten years.

Article 5: By judgment of the tribunal in the jurisdiction of the mother house, upon the request of the public prosecutor, the liquidator—appointed immediately after the promulgation of the law—shall inventory the assets of the congregations, which may not be rented or leased without his consent. The liquidator shall also administer the assets of institutions as they close and proceed with the liquidation of the properties and values of dissolved congregations under the conditions set forth by this law.

== Implementation ==
The law was adopted by the Chamber of Deputies on March 28, 1904, by 316 votes to 269, and by the Senate on July 5, 1904. It was promulgated on July 7, 1904.

The law applied to all levels of education—primary, secondary, and higher—and all types of schools, including professional, agricultural, and artistic institutions. It effectively condemned exclusively teaching congregations to dissolution.

However, specific forms of education within hospital-type institutions—such as training apprentices or teaching orphans and students with disabilities—remained permissible. Additionally, an amendment by Georges Leygues allowed congregations to continue operating overseas if they contributed to France's international influence.

== Consequences ==
Despite the ambitions of the law, its implementation was inconsistent. When Combes left office in 1905, only 3015 of the planned 6129 closures had occurred.

The law profoundly altered the educational system and reinforced the secularization of French education.
