= Société des agriculteurs de France =

The Société des agriculteurs de France is a learned society promoting better agricultural methods in France which has been continuously active since 1867.
