= Castel-Sarrazin =

- Commune
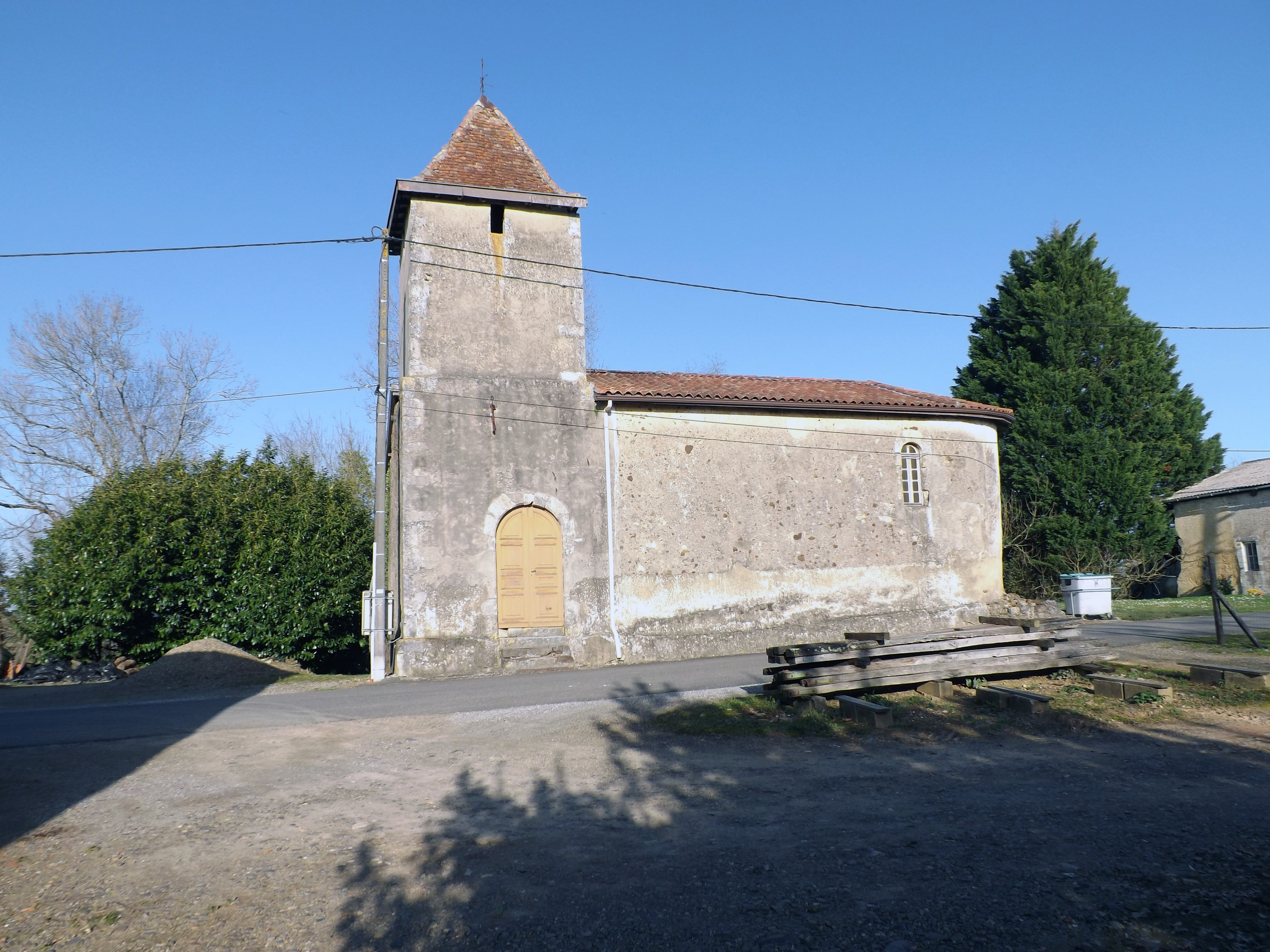
- Location of Castel-Sarrazin
- Location within France Location within Nouvelle-Aquitaine
- Coordinates: 43°37′14″N 0°46′46″W
- Country: France
- Region: Nouvelle-Aquitaine
- Department: Landes
- Arrondissement: Dax
- Canton: Coteau de Chalosse

Government
  - Mayor (2020–2026): Philippe Novembre
- Area^{1}: 12.01 km^{2} (4.64 sq mi)
- Elevation: 34 m (112 ft)
- Highest elevation: 73 m (240 ft)
- Lowest elevation: 25 m (82 ft)
- Population (2023): 559
  - Density: 46.5/km^{2} (121/sq mi)
- Time zone: UTC+01:00 (CET)
  - Summer (DST): UTC+02:00 (CEST)
- INSEE/Postal code: 40074 /40330
- ^{1} French Land Register data, which excludes lakes, ponds, glaciers > 1 km^{2} (0.386 sq mi or 247 acres) and river estuaries.

Castel-Sarrazin (French pronunciation: [kastɛl saʁazɛ̃]; Occitan: Castèl-Sarrasins) is a commune in the Landes department in Nouvelle-Aquitaine in southwestern France.

Castel-Sarrazin is the hometown of the top ranking Michelin starred chef Alain Ducasse.

It is mentioned with fondness in the memoirs of Sir John Kincaid. ‘Castle Sarrazin is a respectable little town on the right bank of the Garonne; and its inhabitants received us so kindly, that every officer found in his quarter a family home.’

== Population ==
Historical population
Year	Pop.	±% p.a.
1968	419	—
1975	378	−1.46%
1982	371	−0.27%
1990	363	−0.27%
1999	360	−0.09%
2007	461	+3.14%
2012	535	+3.02%
2017	543	+0.30%
2023	559	+0.49%
Source: INSEE

== See also ==
- Communes of the Landes department
