= Louis-Martin Berthault =

French architect

- Born: 30 September 1770; Paris, France
- Died: 16 August 1823 (aged 52); Tours, France
- Known for: Architect, decorator, engraver and landscape artist

Louis-Martin Berthault (30 September 1770 – 16 August 1823) was a French architect, decorator, engraver and landscape artist.

== Career ==
Louis-Martin Berthault was born in Paris on 30 September 1770 into a wealthy family of Paris entrepreneurs. Before the French Revolution of 1789, Berthault organized balls for the Comte d'Artois, who later became Charles X of France.

Berthault established a clientele among those who had gained riches in the revolution. In 1801, the Duchess of Brissac sold the Château de Pontchartrain to the industrialist and speculator Claude-Xavier Carvillon des Tillières, a leader of the "Black Band" syndicate of businessmen enriched by the Directory who specialized in the purchase and liquidation of the great aristocratic estates. Carvillon engaged Berthault to transform the gardens from the French style to that of an English park.

After the Empire was established in 1804, Berthault extended his clientele to aristocrats who returned from exile and regained possession of their property. Berthault served Napoleon as a landscape architect, succeeding Jean-Marie Morel at Queen Hortense's residence at the Château de Saint-Leu in Taverny. Berthault designed the parks of Compiègne and Malmaison in the English style, and was the architect responsible for the renovations of the Château de Compiègne. A Sèvres porcelain basket to hold flowers or fruit, now held in the Metropolitan Museum of Art, was designed by Berthault in 1814.

After the Bourbon Restoration in 1814, Berthault continued to serve an elite clientele. Baron James de Rothschild undertook major changes to his mansion on rue Laffitte between 1820 and 1825. Berthault was hired to make the stairway wider, and to build a ballroom over the garden capable of holding 3,000 guests. Berthault also organized several of the balls, and provided floral decorations. He organized a ball on 3 March 1821 attended by over 1,500 people at which each lady received a bouquet of flowers and also a diamond ring of brooch.

Louis-Martin Berthault died at Tours on 16 August 1823.

== Works ==
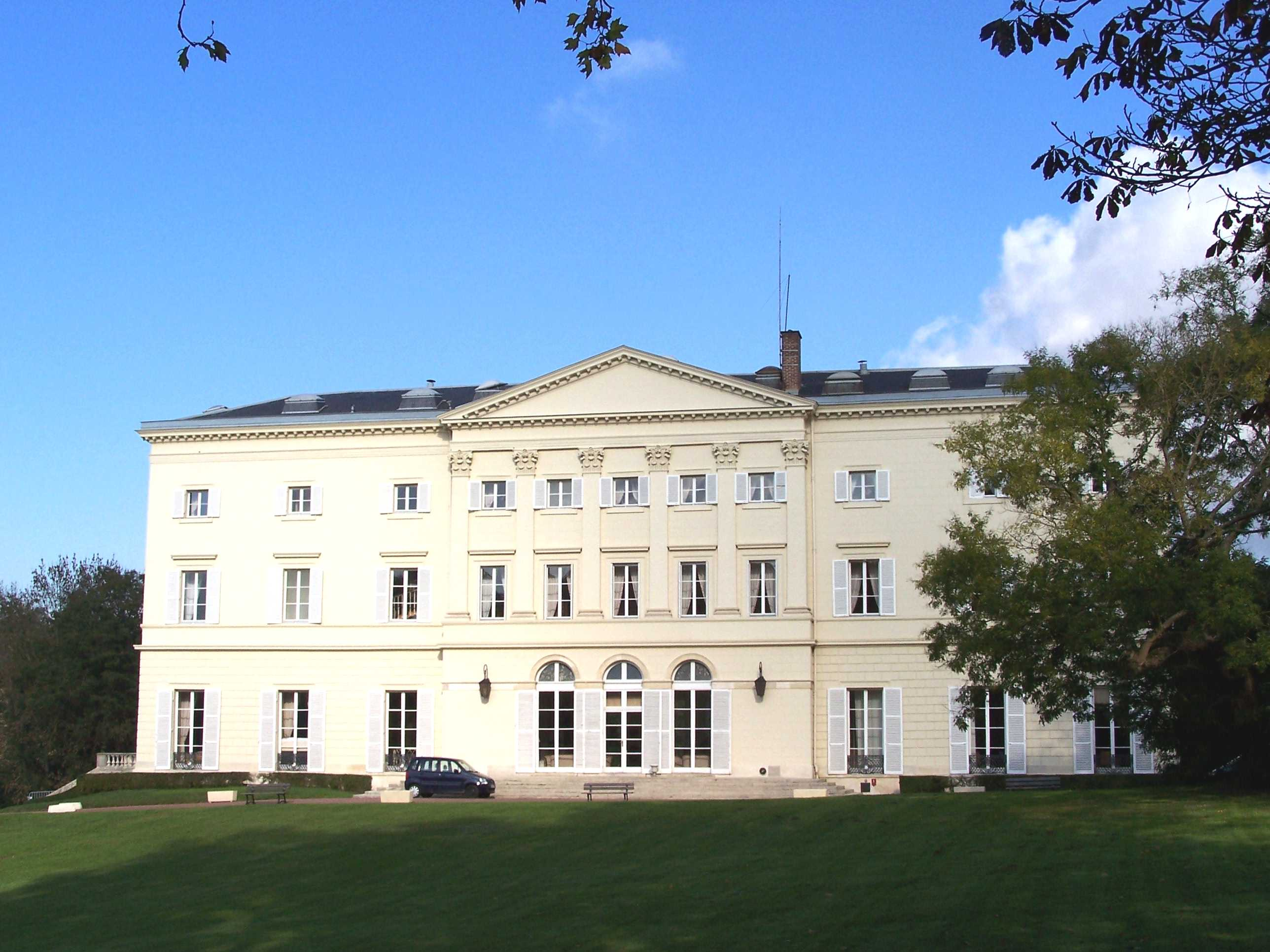
Château de Jouy-en-Josas.

Some of Berthault's main architectural and landscaping works were:

- Hôtel Necker, rue de la Chaussée-d'Antin, Paris (9th arrondissement), 1798: Interior decoration for the banker Récamier and his wife Juliette Récamier
- Château de Pontchartrain, Jouars-Pontchartrain, Yvelines: Transformation into an English park for the speculator Claude-Xavier Carvillon des Tillières, who bought the estate in 1801
- Château du Raincy, Le Raincy, Seine-Saint-Denis: Development of the park for the financier Gabriel-Julien Ouvrard, occupant of the château from 1799 to 1807
- Château de Stains, Stains, Seine-Saint-Denis: transformations for Sanguin de Livry
- Château de Jouy-en-Josas, Jouy-en-Josas, Yvelines: Reconstruction of the château for the chemist and ammunition manufacturer Armand Seguin, who bought the estate in 1801
- Château d'Épinay, Épinay-sur-Seine, Seine-Saint-Denis: Transformation for Perrin d'Épinay
- Château de Champlâtreux, Épinay-Champlâtreux, Val-d'Oise: Restoration for Mathieu Molé
- Château de Méry-sur-Oise, Méry-sur-Oise, Val-d'Oise: Transformation into English gardens for Vicomtesse Christian de Lamoignon (Note: The work at Château de Méry-sur-Oise is equally attributed to Louis-Sulpice Varé)
- Château de la Petite Malmaison, Rueil-Malmaison, Hauts-de-Seine, 1807: Decoration of rooms and creation of an English garden for Joséphine de Beauharnais
- Château de Saint-Leu, Saint-Leu-la-Forêt, Val-d'Oise, 1805: Transformation into an English park for Hortense de Beauharnais and her husband Louis Bonaparte
- Park of Prulay, 1807
- Château de La Malmaison, 1808: Development of an English-style park
- Park of the Château de Navarre near Évreux, 1808;
- Villeneuve-l'Étang, 1808
- Château de Compiègne, 1808-1811, Restoration
- Park of Moulin-Joly in Colombes, 1812
- Park of Château de Gerbéviller, 1816
- Gardens of the Château de Courson, Essonne for the Arrighi de Casanova, 1822
- Development of the Pincio gardens in Rome
- Park of the Château de Chantilly
