= Léon Battu =

French dramatist

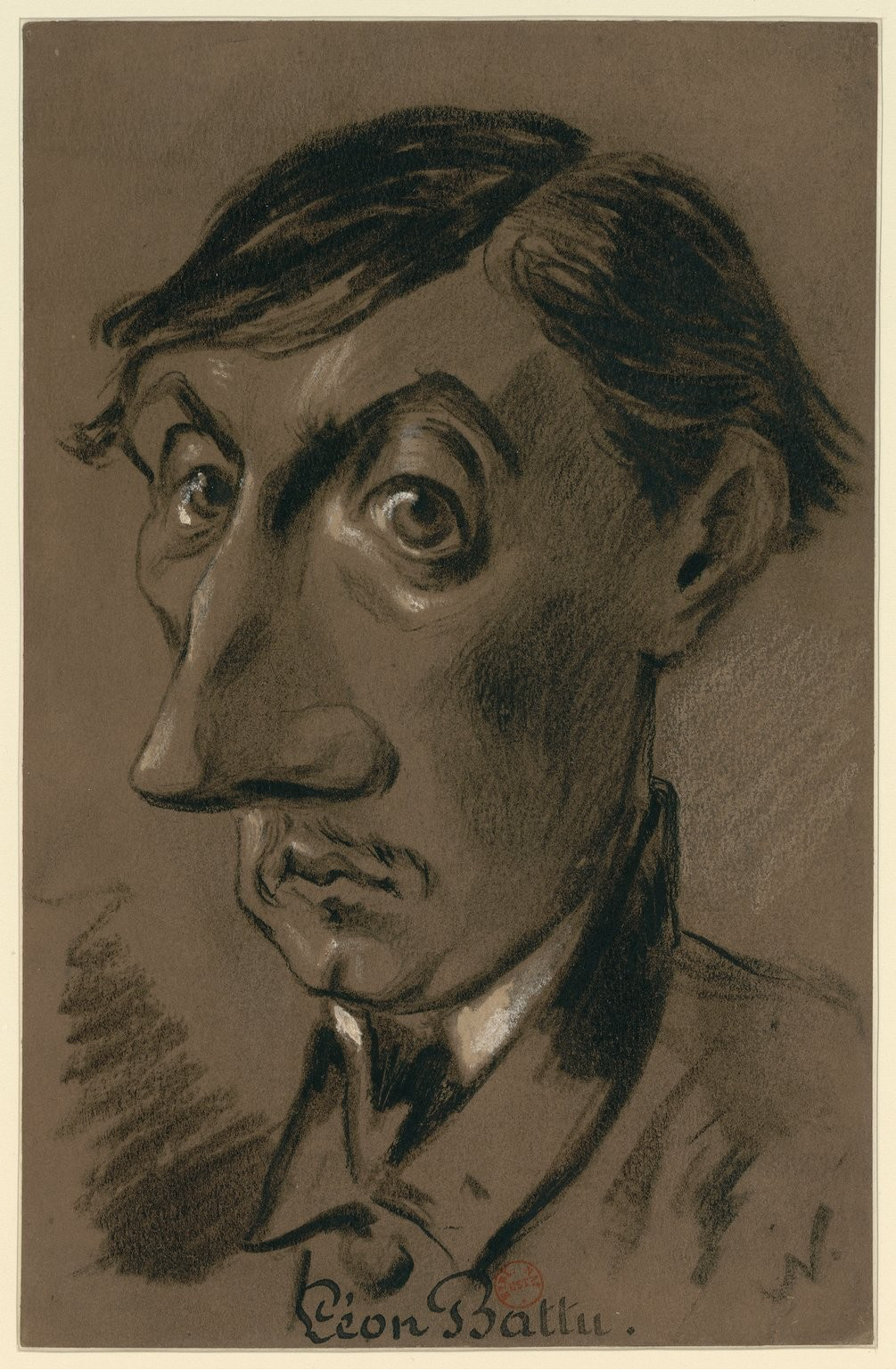
- Born: 1829; Paris, France
- Died: 1857 (aged 27–28); Paris, France
- Occupation: Playwright
- Writing career
- Language: French

Léon Battu was a French dramatist, born 1829 in Paris, where he died on 22 November 1857.

== Life and career ==
The son of Pantaléon Battu (1799–1870), a violinist and assistant conductor at the Opéra de Paris, and brother of the soprano Marie Battu (1838–1888) who created Inès in L'Africaine, he wrote many vaudevilles and libretti. In the fields of opéra-comique and opérettes, these were in collaboration with Ludovic Halévy, Michel Carré, Jules Barbier, Jules Moinaux and Lockroy. His composers were Jacques Offenbach (Pépito, Le mariage aux lanternes), Adolphe Adam (Les Pantins de Violette), Victor Massé (La Reine Topaze), Georges Bizet and Charles Lecocq (Le Docteur Miracle). With Halévy he translated Mozart's Der Schauspieldirektor for its Mozart centenary production at the Théâtre des Bouffes-Parisiens in 1856.

He died at the age of 29 after years of illness and his funeral service on 24 November 1857 was attended by more than 500 people, including much of literary and musical Paris.

== Works ==
=== Theatre ===
- Les extrêmes se touchent, with Adrien Decourcelle, 27 January 1848, Théâtre des Variétés, Paris
- Les Deux font la paire, with Michel Carré, 25 October 1848, Théâtre des Variétés
- Les Suites d'un feu d'artifice, with Arthur de Beauplan and Clairville, 1848, Théâtre du Vaudeville, Paris
- Jobin et Nanette, with Michel Carré, 1 May 1849, Théâtre des Variétés
- Nisus et Euryale, with Eugène Bercioux, 1850, Théâtre des Variétés
- Madame Diogène, with Nérée Desarbres, 1852, Théâtre du Vaudeville
- Les Quatre Coins, 7 November 1852, Théâtre de l'Odéon, Paris
- L'Honneur de la maison, with Maurice Desvignes, 6 July 1853, Théâtre de la Porte-Saint-Martin, Paris
- Un Verre de Champagne, with Adrien Decourcelle, 1855, Théâtre des Variétés
- Lucie Didier, with Adolphe Jaime fils, 12 January 1856, Théâtre du Vaudeville
- Les Cheveux de ma femme, with Eugène Labiche, 19 January 1856, Théâtre des Variétés

=== Opéras comiques, operettas ===
- Le Trésor à Mathurin, music by Jacques Offenbach, 7 May 1855, Salle Herz, Paris
- Jacqueline ou la Fille du soldat, with Eugène Labiche and Édouard Fournier, music by Jules Costé and the Comte d'Osmond, 8 June 1855, Opéra-Comique, Paris
- L'Anneau d'argent, with Jules Barbier, music by Louis Deffès, 5 July 1855, Opéra-Comique, Paris
- Pépito, with Jules Moinaux, music by Jacques Offenbach, 28 October 1855, Théâtre des Variétés
- Élodie ou le Forfait nocturne, with Hector Crémieux, music by Jacques Offenbach, 19 January 1856, Bouffes-Parisiens, Paris
- Les Pantins de Violette, with Ludovic Halévy, music by Adolphe Adam, 29 April 1856, Bouffes-Parisiens
- L'Imprésario, translation, with Ludovic Halévy, music by Mozart, 20 May 1856, Bouffes-Parisiens
- La Reine Topaze, with Lockroy, music by Victor Massé, 27 December 1856, Théâtre-Lyrique
- Le Docteur Miracle, with Ludovic Halévy, two versions: one by Georges Bizet, the other by Charles Lecocq, 9 April 1857, Bouffes-Parisiens
- Le Cousin de Marivaux, with Ludovic Halévy, music by Victor Massé, 15 August 1957, Baden-Baden
- Le Mariage aux lanternes, with Michel Carré, music by Jacques Offenbach, 10 October 1857, Bouffes-Parisiens
