= Blanche-Joséphine Le Bascle d'Argenteuil =

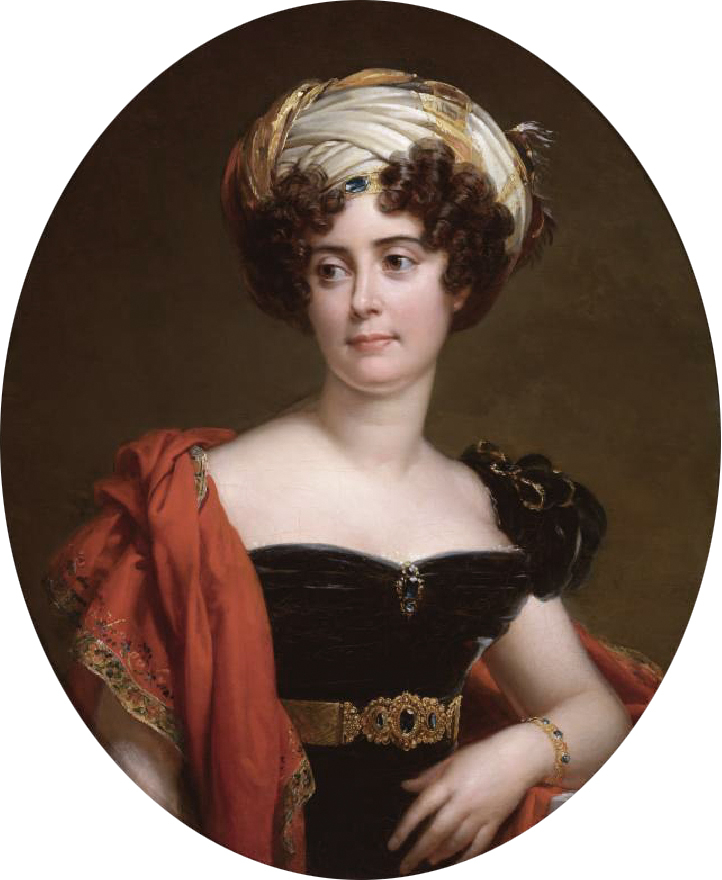
Blanche-Joséphine Le Bascle d'Argenteuil (François Gérard)

Blanche-Joséphine Le Bascle d'Argenteuil (22 April 1787 – 10 September 1851), by her second marriage duchess of Maillé, was a French lady of letters and memoir writer. She has left highly interesting memoirs in which her legitimist convictions are shown not to affect the sharpness of her political analysis.

== Early life ==
She was born in Tours, and raised in Paris in her family's Hôtel particulier (essentially a grand townhouse) at 85 rue du Faubourg St. Honoré. She was a daughter of Lt-Gen. Jean-Louis-Marie Le Bascle, Marquis d'Argenteuil (1749–1794) and Catherine Barjot de Roncé.

During the French Revolution, her family lived in Switzerland and Germany. They returned to France in 1797 by her uncle the Charles Joseph Fortuné, Marquis d'Herbouville (husband of her aunt Marie-Louise-Victoire d'Argenteuil) during the French directoire. Her uncle, who raised her and established her in Paris in 1809, was prefect of the Department of the two Netes from 1800 to 1805 during the First French Empire.

== Career ==
She served as Dame d'honneur to the Duchess of Berry during the Bourbon Restoration and her husband served as premier Gentilhomme de la Chambre (essentially the French equivalent of the Gentleman of the Bedchamber). She didn't like her stay at court because she thought the Duchess' entertainment was to frivolous. To bring together a group for discussions on art and literature she founded together with the Marquis de Crillon, her cousin, the Société du Château. With the accession of Louis Philippe I in 1830, she fell out of favour at court.

With her cousin, the Marquise de Crillon, she founded the "Société du Château" which brought together a group that discussed art, music and literature. From 1832 until her death, she presided over a salon, a weekly gathering in her house, for writers, artists and politicians. She received her guests every Thursday in her house in Paris near Saint-Germain-des-Prés on the rue de Lille. She authored two narratives of the period: Souvenirs des Deux Restaurations, which was written between 1814 and 1830, and Mémoires (1832-1851), which chronicled life in Paris from the Restoration up to Napoleon III's accession and featured many of her famous contemporaries, including Honoré de Balzac and Alphonse de Lamartine.

== Personal life ==
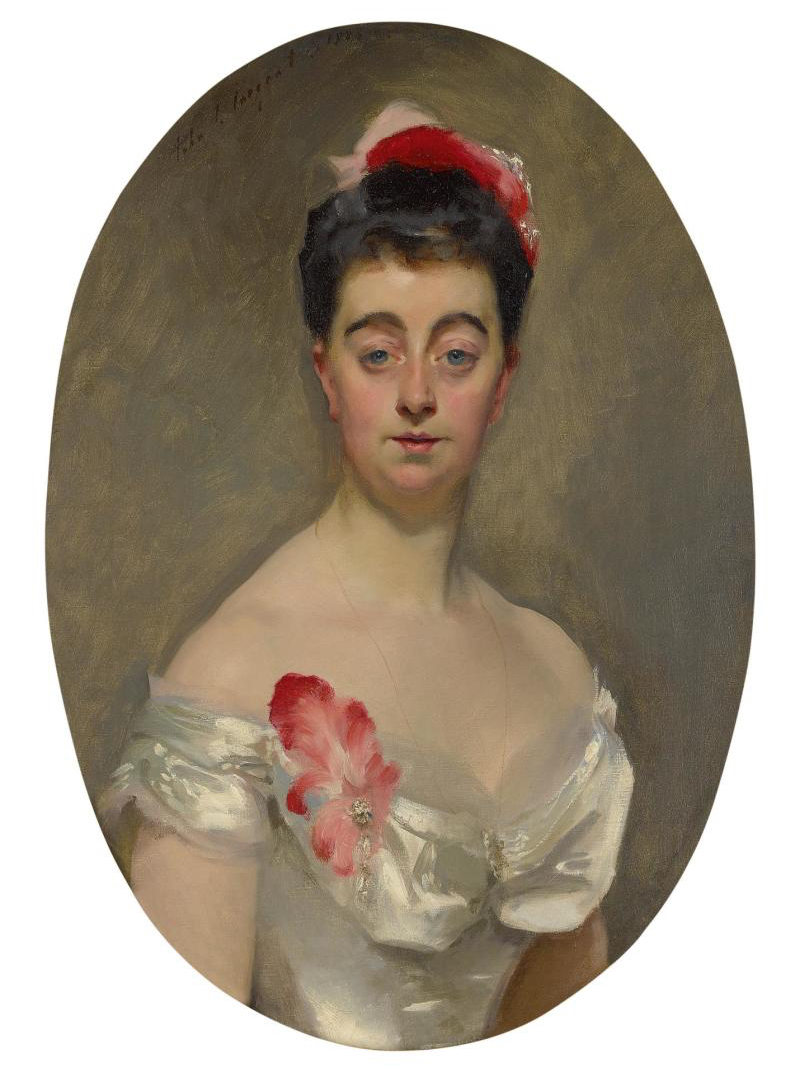
Portrait of her granddaughter, Renée, the Countess de Ganay, by John Singer Sargent, 1885.

On 2 January 1811, she married Charles de Maillé de La Tour-Landry, 2nd Duke of Maillé (1770–1837). Her husband, who was eighteen years her senior, had been a widower since 1809 following the death of his first wife, Henriette Fitz-James (a daughter of the 5th Duke of Fitz-James). (Note: From her husband's first marriage, he had three children: Armand Paul Claude Charles de Maillé de la Tour Landry (1795–1807), Claire Clemence Henriette Claudine de Maillé de la Tour Landry (1796–1861) (wife of the 2nd Duke of Castries and, reportedly, a lover of the novelist and playwright Honoré de Balzac), and Armand Roger Claude de Maillé de la Tour Landry (b. 1799). Both sons died, without issue, before their father, so the Duke's son from his second marriage succeeded to the Dukedom of Maillé in 1837.) Together, Charles and Blanche lived outside of Paris at the Château de Lormois, and were the parents of two children:

- Jacquelin de La Tour-Landry, 3rd Duke of Maillé (1815–1874), who married Jeanne d'Osmond (1827–1899), a daughter of Gen. Rainulphe d'Osmond, Marquis d'Osmond and Aimée Caroillon des Tillières. From this marriage, the family inherited the Claude Destillières fortune.
- Armand-Urbain de Maillé de La Tour-Landry (1816–1903), who married Jeanne Lebrun de Plaisance, a daughter of the 3rd Duc de Plaisance (himself a grandson of Charles-François Lebrun).

The Duke of Maillé died on 5 January 1837. The Duchess of Maillé died, accidentally, on 10 September 1851 while staying at the Rochefoucauld's Château de la Roche Courbon.

=== Descendants ===
Through her son Jacquelin, she was a grandmother of Renée de Maillé de La Tour-Landry (1851–1933), who married Gen. Jacques de Ganay (1843–1899), a son of Charles-Alexandre, Marquis de Ganay and grandson of Count James-Alexandre de Pourtalès (a prominent banker and art collector who served as chamberlain to the King of Prussia Frederick William III).

== Works ==
- Souvenirs des deux Restaurations. Journal inédit, presented by Xavier de La Fournière, 1984
- Mémoires. 1832-1851, 1989
