= Aimée Caroillon des Tillières =

French salon-holder (1797–1853)

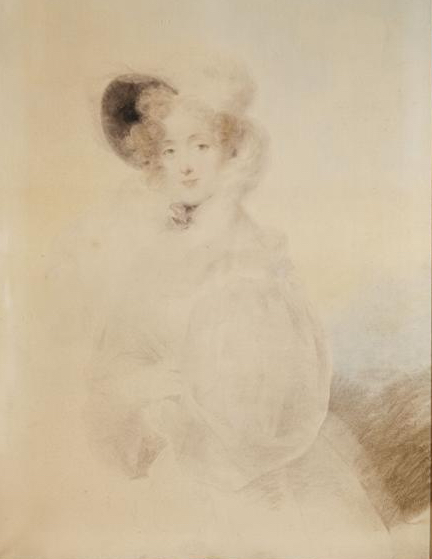
- Born: 1797
- Died: 2 August 1853 (aged 55–56)
- Occupation: Heiress
- Spouse: Rainulphe d'Osmond (after 1817)

Marie Louise Angélique Aimée Caroillon des Tillières, (or Aimée d'Osmond) (28 September 1797 – 2 August 1853) was a wealthy French heiress who kept a salon during the July Monarchy.

== Early years ==
Marie Louise Angélique Aimée Caroillon des Tillières was born in 1797, only daughter of the wealthy entrepreneur Claude Caroillon Destillières and his wife, Françoise Aimée Magallon d'Amirail. Her father was from a rich family, ennobled in 1786, who made his fortune during and after the revolution through real estate transactions. (Note: Aimée's father, originally Claude Caroillon, changed the more aristocratic-sounding "Caroillon des Tillières" to the commoner "Caroillon Destillières" after the revolution. Aimée reverted to the earlier form.)

Claude Caroillon-Destillières died in May 1814 and Aimée Carvillon Destillères inherited his immense fortune. Since she was only seventeen, a minor, her family chose her maternal grandparents as guardians. This was the subject of lawsuits, not resolved until 22 November 1816. She sold the Château du Raincy to Napoleon, but kept the Château de Pontchartrain. Although not beautiful, she was courted by many men for her wealth.

== Personal life ==
On 25 November 1817, Aimée married Charles-Eustache-Gabriel, called Rainulphe d'Osmond, Count and later Marquis d'Osmond (1787–1862) and a Lieutenant-General of Cavalry. He was the brother of the diarist Adèle d'Osmond, Countess de Boigne. Together, they had two children:

- Marie Charlotte Eustachine Jeanne (1827–1899), who married Jacquelin de Maillé de La Tour-Landry, 3rd Duke of Maillé (1815–1874), a son of Blanche-Joséphine Le Bascle d'Argenteuil.
- Rainulphe Marie Eustache d'Osmond (1829–1891), who married Marie Joséphine Tardieu de Maleyssie. Their son, Eustache Conrad d'Osmond (1855–1904) died without marrying, so the descendants of the Duke of Maillé inherited the Caroillon Destillières fortune.

The Marquise d'Osmond was gentle, modest and beneficial. According to the gossip of the time she was whipped by her husband.

=== Salon ===
Under the July Monarchy, she kept a very brilliant salon. With the Duchess of Berry she helped launch the fashionable neo-Gothic style. They decorated her Parisian hôtel at 8 Rue Basse du Rempart in neo-gothic style. It was later destroyed and is known only by a watercolor by Ambroise Louis Garneray. She also ordered beautiful neo-gothic furniture from Jacob Desmalter.

== Sources ==
- Bann, Stephen (26 November 2011), "Alternative Paradigms for the Historical Museum: Lenoir's Monuments Français and Du Sommerard's Cluny" (PDF), Great Narratives of the Past. Traditions and Revisions in National Museums Conference, Linköping University Electronic Press
- Chardon, Olivier Jacques (1844). Traité des trois puissances, maritale, paternelle et tutélaire: Comprenant la puissance tutélaire. Wahlen. p. 116.
- "Château de Saint-Assise". www.seine-port.fr. Archived from the original on 20 April 2012.
- Congrès national des sociétés savantes (1962). "Section d'histoire moderne et contemporaine". Actes. Impr. nationale.
- Destillères Osmond, Aimée Carvillon; Degout, Bernard (1996). France – Angleterre: l'album d'aquarelles de Mme d'Osmond, 1834. Maison de Châteaubriand. p. 11. ISBN 978-2-9504496-7-2.
- Rives, M.; Bignan, M. A. (1858). Œuvres de M. Charles Brifaut. Paris: P. Diard.
- Wagener, Françoise (1997). La comtesse de Boigne: 1781–1866. Flammarion. ISBN 978-2-08-067193-6.
