= René-Eustache, marquis d'Osmond =

French nobleman and diplomat

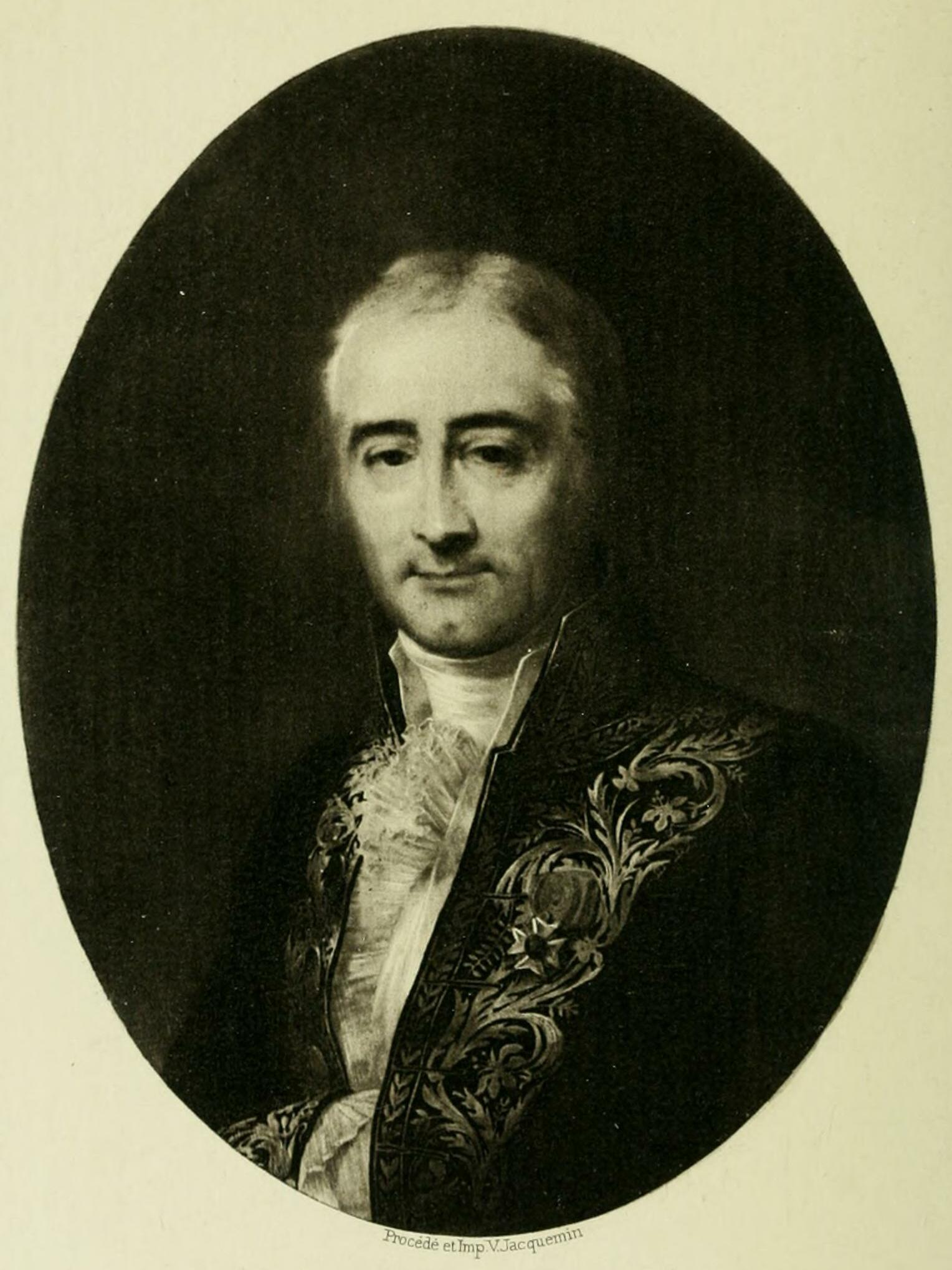
René-Eustache Marquis D'Osmond

Coat of arms d'Osmond

René-Eustache, marquis d'Osmond (17 December 1751, Saint-Domingue – 22 February 1838, Paris) was a nobleman who served in the French Army and as a diplomat during the Bourbon Restoration.

== Family and early life ==
Born at Fort-Dauphin in Saint-Domingue, his father was Louis-Eustache d'Osmond (1718-1782), 3rd comte de Boitron, and his mother was Marie-Élisabeth née Cavelier de La Garenne.

He was sent to France to join the Army and after being commissioned as Sous-lieutenant in the cavalry Régiment de Chartres, in 1771 he was seconded to the Régiment de Bourgogne, promoted 1776 as Mestre-de-camp lieutenant en second (Major) in the Duke of Orléans' Dragoons, becoming Colonel en second of the regiment in 1780, and then Mestre-de-camp commandant (Colonel) of the Régiment de Barrois (Infantry) from 1 January 1784.

His uncle, Barnabé, comte d'Osmond (1716-1792), was Chamberlain of the Royal Orleans household and introduced him to the court of Louis Philippe I, Duke of Orléans (1725-1785). René-Eustache d'Osmond then became in regular attendance at the Castle of St Assisi, where the Royal Duke had taken up residence with his morganatic wife, Charlotte marquise de Montesson.

On 15 March 1778, when stationed with his regiment at Blanquefort, he married Hélène-Éléonore Dillon (1753-1831), a creole beauty from the Martinique family de Tascher. They had two children:

- Adélaïde-Charlotte-Louise-Éléonore, comtesse de Boigne (1781-1866), a celebrated diarist;
- Charles-Eustache-Gabriel (1787-1862), 2nd (styled 5th) marquis d'Osmond.

== Later career ==
In 1786 d'Osmond secured the purchase of the Armand-Joseph, duc de Charost's coal mining interests at Firminy and Roche-la-Molière, near Saint-Étienne, but his perceived business coup ran into difficulties from the outset since their smooth operation was hampered by local hostility. The French Revolutionaries supported the ransacking of mining businesses, and he tried in vain to obtain Constituent Assembly approval for his business concessions.

Fortuitously, he had resigned as Governor of Rouen in 1788 and entered French diplomatic service. He was appointed Minister Plenipotentiary to The Hague in 1789, then Ambassador to St Petersburg in 1790, where he replaced Louis-Philippe, comte de Ségur. However, he resigned following the flight to Varennes without ever occupying the post, and joined his family, who already emigrated to Switzerland in 1792.

His brother, Antoine-Eustache d'Osmond (Constitutional Bishop of Nancy), who had sided with the Emperor Napoleon, ensured that his name was removed from the list of emigrants enabling him to return to France during the régime of the First French Empire.

On 17 August 1815, King Louis XVIII appointed him a Lieutenant-General of the Army as well as a hereditary peer. He was then posted as French Ambassador to Turin (1814-1815) and then to London (November 1815-January 1819). He was created a marquis and peer of France by Royal decree, dated 31 August 1817 (in the title previously held by a senior branch of the d'Osmond family, extinct 1771).

In 1814, he was restored to the rights of his coal mining interests, but short of working capital and know-how, he exchanged them for a percentage of shares in the new Compagnie des Mines de Roche-Firminy.

== See also ==
- List of Ambassadors of France to the United Kingdom
- Famille d'Osmond (in French)
