= Jules Costé =

French lawyer and composer

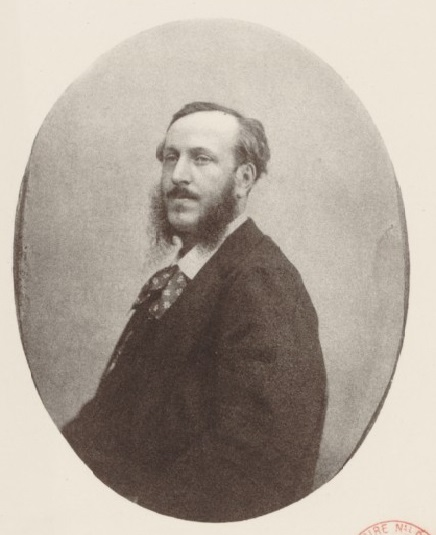
- Born: 13 February 1828; Colmar
- Died: 12 November 1883 (aged 55); Paris
- Occupations: Lawyer; Composer

Edme Jules called Jules Costé, (13 February 1828 – 12 November 1883) was a 19th-century French lawyer and composer of operettas and opéras-comiques.

== Main works ==
- 1855: Jacqueline ou la Fille du soldat, one-act opéra-comique, libretto by Eugène Scribe, Léon Battu and Edouard Fournier, music with the comte d'Osmond, presented at the Comédie Italienne, 15 Mai
- 1855: Une pleine eau, one-act opérette bouffe, libretto by Ludovic Halévy (under the pseudonym Jules Servières), music with the comte d'Osmond, Bouffes-Parisiens, 29 August
- 1868: Les Horreurs de la guerre, two-act opéra bouffe, libretto by Philippe Gille (Paris, Cercle de l'Union artistique, then Théâtre de l'Athénée, 9 December)
- 1868: La Paix armée, one-act operetta (Paris, Cercle de l'Union artistique, 16 April)
- 1872: Le Service obligatoire, three-act opérette bouffe, libretto by Albert Marion, Henri Meilhac and Fournier-Sarloveze, music with Emmanuel Chabrier and René de Boisdeffre (Paris, Cercle de l'Union artistique, 21 December)
- 1873: Au harem, one-act ballet (in comte d'Osmond's home, 5 June)
- 1874: Cent mille francs et ma fille, four-act opérette bouffe, libretto by Jaime fils and Philippe Gille (Théâtre des Menus-Plaisirs, 27 April).
- 1876: Le Dada, three-act comédie en vaudeville} by Edmond Gondinet (Théâtre des Variétés, 18 February)
- Les Poupées parisiennes, pièce fantastique in 4 acts by Adolphe-Antoine-Gaston Marot and Henri Buguet, music with Léo Delibes, Victorin Joncières, Gaston Serpette and René de Boisdeffre (Paris, Cercle de l'Union artistique, 6 February)
- 1880: Les Charbonniers, one-act operetta, libretto by Philippe Gille (Théâtre des Variétés, 4 April; Opéra Garnier, 23 December)
- 1881: L’Arche de Noé, oratorio fantaisiste
- 1883: La Belle Catherine, one-act operetta, libretto by marquis de Massa and de Mesgrigny (Paris, Cercle de l'Union artistique, 6 January)
