= Maître Péronilla =

Opéra bouffe by Jacques Offenbach

Jacques Offenbach by Nadar, c. 1860s

Maître Péronilla is an opéra bouffe in three acts of 1878 with music by Jacques Offenbach. The French libretto was by the composer with Charles-Louis-Étienne Nuitter and Paul Ferrier.

The sub-title was La femme à deux maris; the working title during the preparation of the libretto and composition had been Frimouskino, which Offenbach had drafted in the late 1860s. Composed in Nice, Offenbach asked Nuitter and Ferrier to help him with the song lyrics as his regular collaborators, Henri Meilhac and Ludovic Halévy had distanced themselves in order to concentrate on other projects, including work with Charles Lecocq.

Premiered at the Théâtre des Bouffes Parisiens, the piece was taken off after less than two months, and Le timbale d’argent returned to the Bouffes. Reflecting on his many previous successes, when the opera failed to run more than 50 performances, Offenbach wrote to Ludovic Halévy that ‘Offenbach’ was not to be found on the billboards for the 1878 Exhibition.

The work is one of several by Offenbach with Spanish connections: Pépito, La Duchesse d’Albe and Les bavards. The malagueña was inserted as an additional song for Fiorella in the Christmas Day revival of Les brigands at the Théâtre de la Gaîté in 1878.

Two lawsuits concerning the subject of the opera were brought - against Offenbach and after his death against the theatre manager Charles Comte - alleging that the subject matter had been plagiarized from a stage work by Oswald and Lévy.

== Roles ==
Role	Voice type	Premiere cast, 13 Mars 1878 (Conductor: Thibault)
Manoëla	soprano	Humberta
Alvarès	soprano	Blanche Peschard
Léona	mezzo-soprano	Caroline Girard
Frimouskino	mezzo-soprano	Paola Marié
Péronilla	baritone	Daubray
Don Guardona	tenor	Alfred Jolly
Ripardos	baritone	Étienne Troy
Don Henrique de Rio Grande		Sassard
Brid’oison	bass	Scipion
Le Corrégidor	bass	
1st Judge	tenor	Jannin
2nd Judge	tenor	Chambéry
Chorus: Guests, valets, servants, alguazils, women, soldiers

== Synopsis ==
=== Act 1 ===
The gardens of Péronilla
The daughter of Péronilla, the leading chocolate maker in Madrid, the young and beautiful Manoëla, is to be married to old Don Guardona, to the displeasure of Ripardos, a soldier, and Frimouskino, a notary’s clerk. Léona, the sister of Péronilla, has arranged the wedding in order to thwart the attentions of the handsome music master Alvarès. He, having been dismissed by Léona, returns to Péronilla’s house. The marriage contract has already been signed, but Ripardos and Frimouskino in the dim light of the chapel manage to get Alvarès, not Don Guardona into religious union with Manoëla – thus giving her two husbands.

=== Act 2 ===
In the palace of the Marquis Don Henrique de Rio Grande
A group of servants sing of the futility of thwarting true young love. The newly-weds – or rather Manoëla and Alvarès – sit down to dine, joined next by all the wedding guests, including the other husband. Alvarès sings a malagueña. It is agreed to leave explanations to the next day, especially as Péronilla is ashamed of the business and cannot decide between the two new sons-in-law. All retire to bed. Manoëla and Alvarès, with the complicity of Ripardos and Frimouskino (and Péronilla turning a blind eye) are allowed to flee the house but are caught by the alguazils and Manoëla is forced to reside in a convent until the matter has been properly settled.

=== Act 3 ===
In court, a crowd has gathered to watch the case. Witnesses are summoned in turn, and Péronilla resumes his old profession of lawyer and defends the suit of Alvarès. When the judge Brid’oison demands to see the marriage contract it emerges that the name Léona appears instead of Manoëla (a ruse of Frimouskino). The older woman is not unhappy at the prospect of wedding Don Guardona, so Alvarès becomes the only husband of Manoëla.

== Recording ==
Issued 2020. With Véronique Gens, Éric Huchet, Loïc Félix, others, Choeur de Radio France, Orchestre National de France, cond. Markus Poschner. CD: Bru Zane Cat:BZ1039
