= Château de la Petite Malmaison =

Château in Île-de-France, France

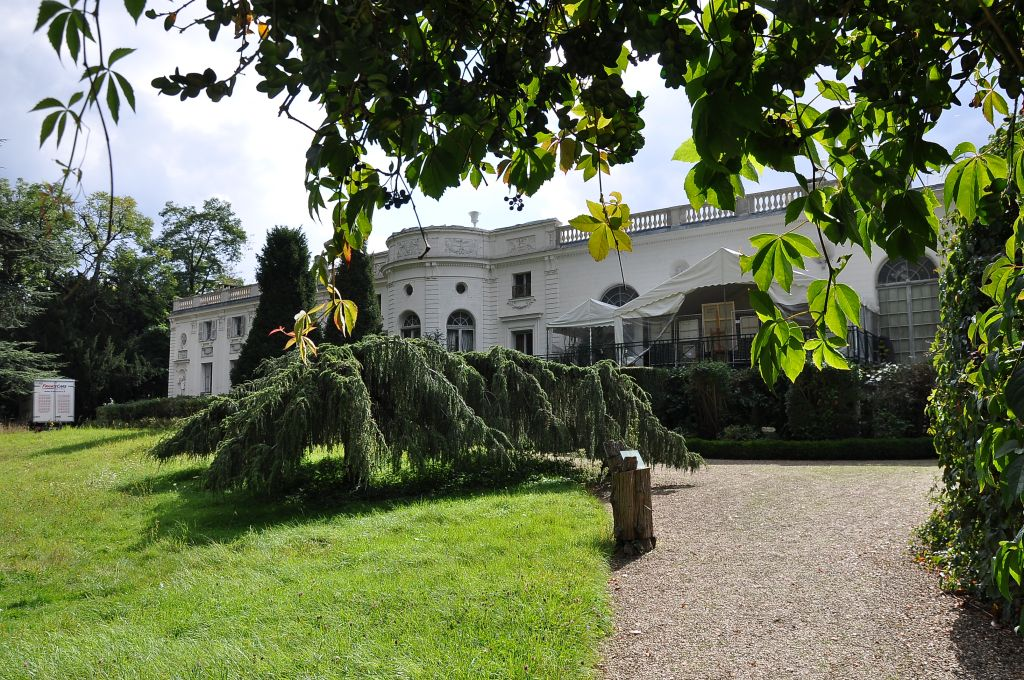

- Location within France

General information
- Architectural style: Empire style
- Location: Rueil-Malmaison, Hauts-de-Seine, France
- Coordinates: 48.869802°N 2.160573°E
- Construction started: 1803
- Completed: 1805
- Owner: Joséphine de Beauharnais

Website
- www.petitemalmaison.fr

The Château de la Petite Malmaison is a French château from the 19th century in the town of Rueil-Malmaison in the Hauts-de-Seine department. It was built between 1803 and 1805 for Joséphine de Beauharnais, owner of the neighboring Château de Malmaison. It was a reception pavilion adjacent to a large greenhouse, since destroyed.

== History ==
The large greenhouse of Malmaison was begun in 1804 for the Empress Josephine by the landscape architect Jean-Marie Morel (1728 - 1810) and completed by the end of 1805 according to plans by Jean-Thomas Thibault (1757-1826) and his partner Barthélemy Vignon (1762-1846). It was the first time in France that glass was used for such a large surface. The greenhouse of Malmaison can be considered the forerunner of the great glass and metal architecture of the 19th century. It was about 50 by 19 metres (164 by 62 ft) and was divided into two distinct sections:

- The greenhouse itself, heated by twelve large stoves, in which trees 5 metres (16 ft) high could grow. Josephine cultivated plants like jasmine, rose, hydrangea and Parma violet.
- Behind and adjacent to it, a building housed a series of salons. A central salon with a rotunda was decorated by Louis-Martin Berthault in 1807, from where it was possible to view rare plants while resting after visiting the greenhouse. The roof was luxuriously decorated and furnished by the best craftsmen of the time such as the marble mason Gilet and the cabinetmaker Jacob Desmalter.

The park was designed in the English style, also by Louis-Martin Berthault, named as landscape designer to the Empress Josephine.

Due to the expense of maintenance, the greenhouse was demolished in 1827. The rooms were partly redecorated in 1828 by the new owner, the Swedish banker Jonas-Philip Hagerman. After the sale of the estate in lots in 1878, in 1887 the Petite Malmaison became the property of Pascal of the Two Sicilies (1852-1904), Count of Bari, youngest son of Ferdinand II of the Two Sicilies, who lived in his Parisian hotel at 8 avenue Matignon, but died in the Petite Malmaison in 1904 .

== Description ==
The subdivision of the park separated the Petite Malmaison from the Château de Malmaison. The park, planted with chestnut, cedar, bald cypress, yew and boxwood, is treated as an English park, but the rear has traces of the French style. There is a pond.

== Protection status ==
First listed in the supplementary inventory of historic monuments on 9 February 1968, the Château de la Petite Malmaison been classified as a historical monument since 26 April 1995. Protection also includes the park.

== Gallery ==
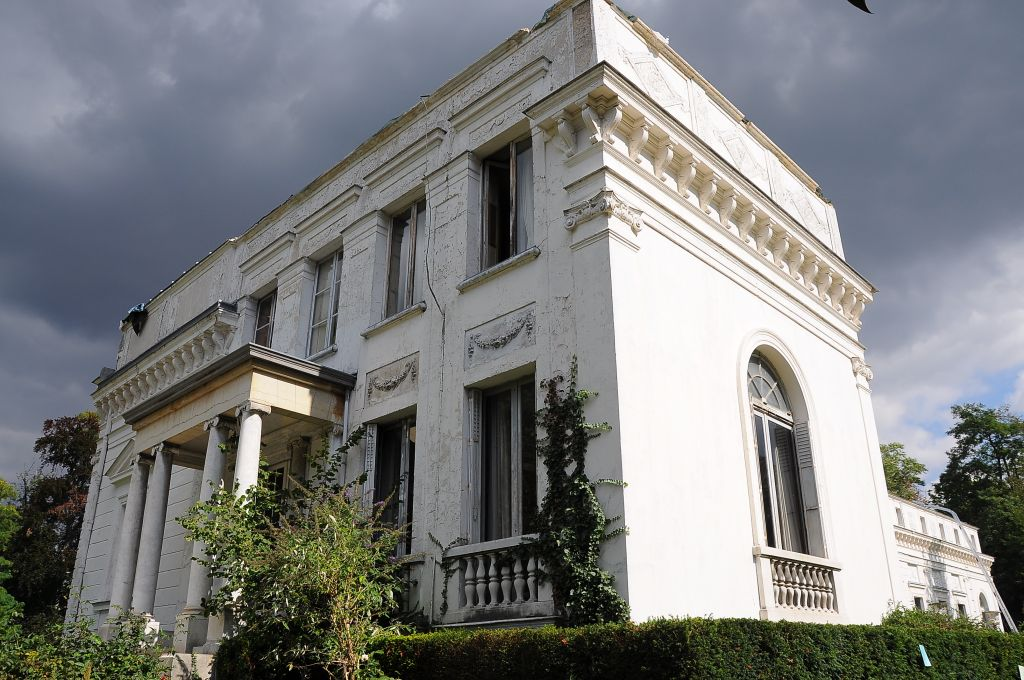
Le château de la Petite Malmaison

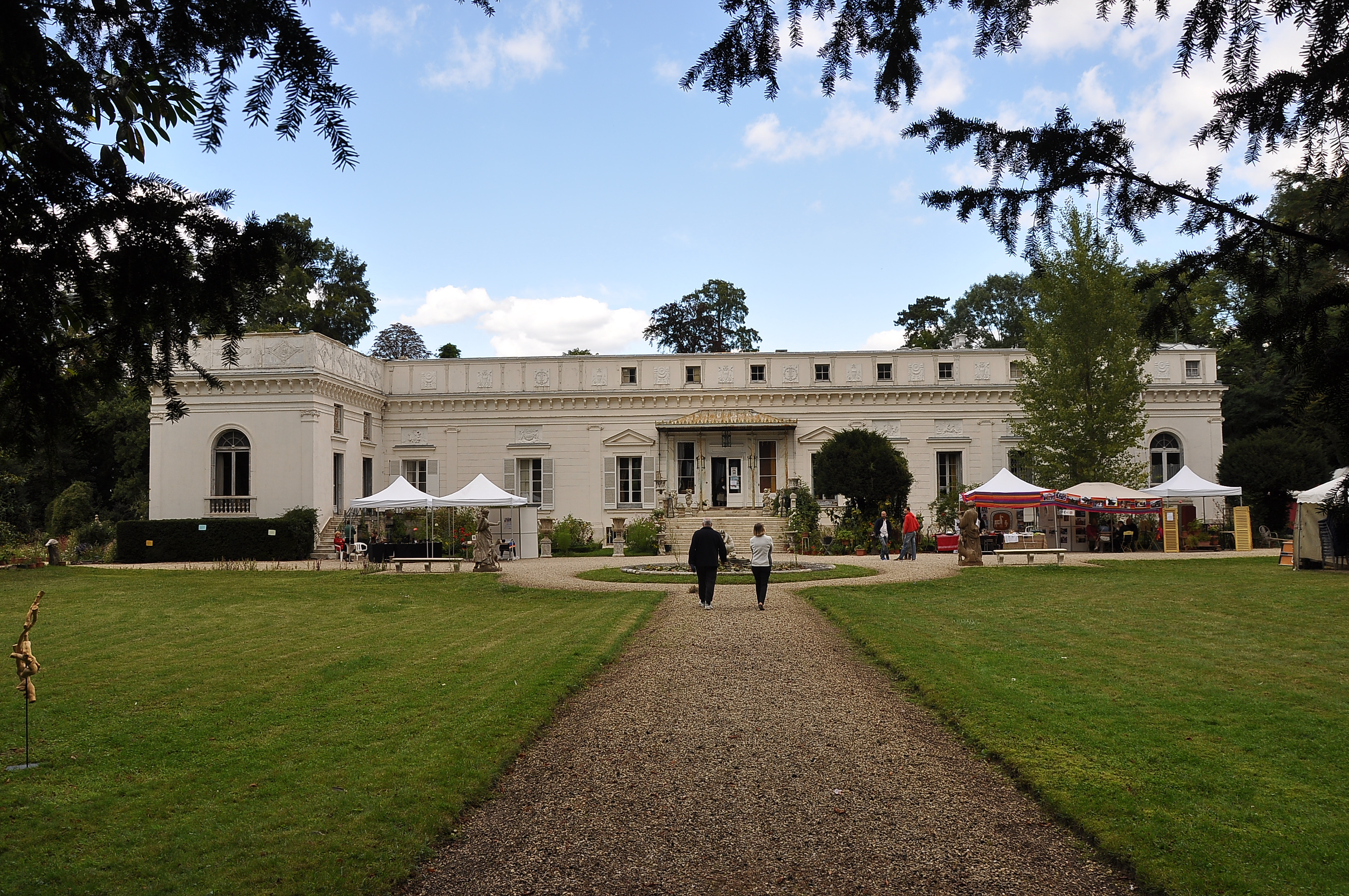
View of the south façade

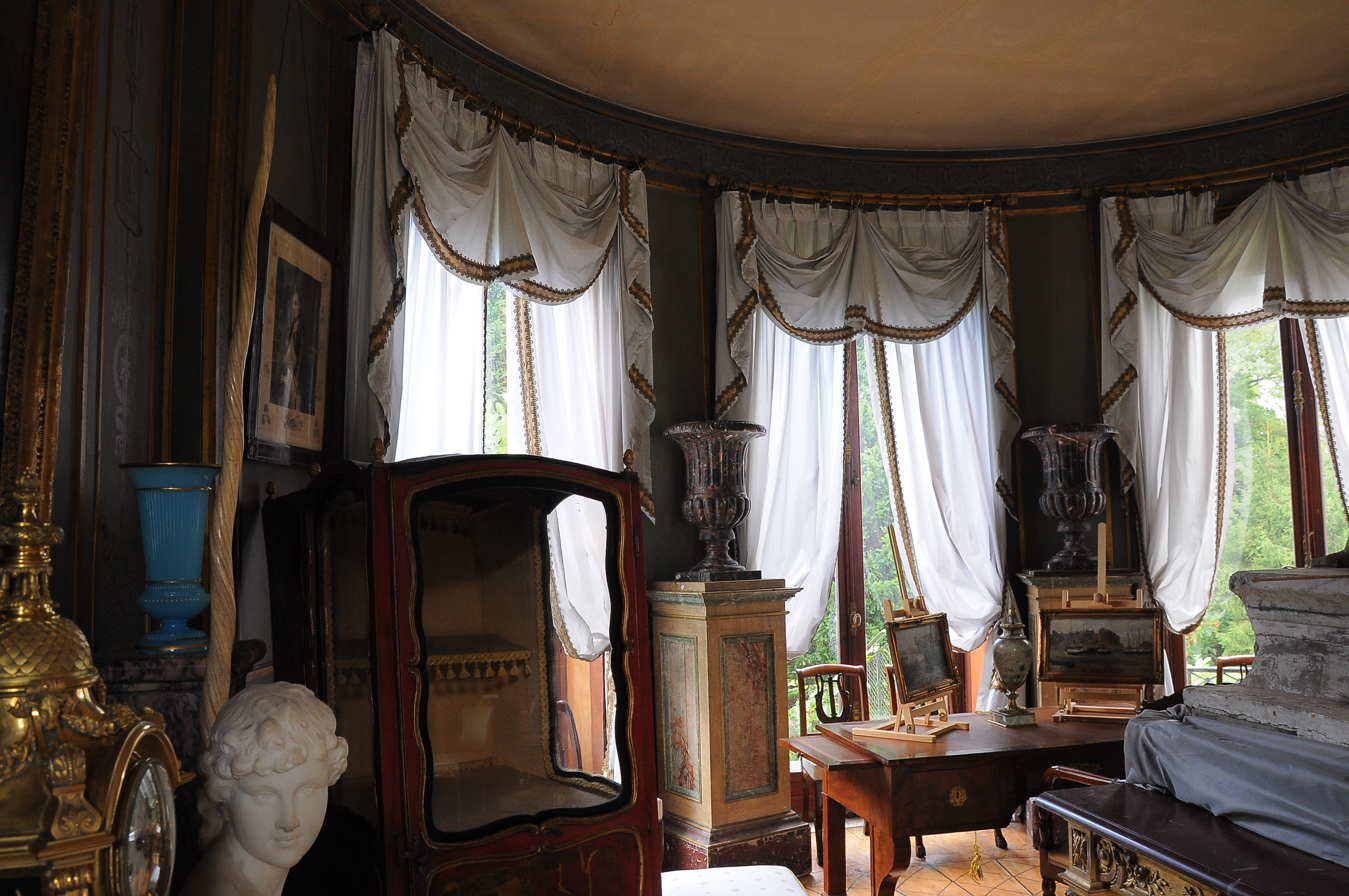
Interior of the château.

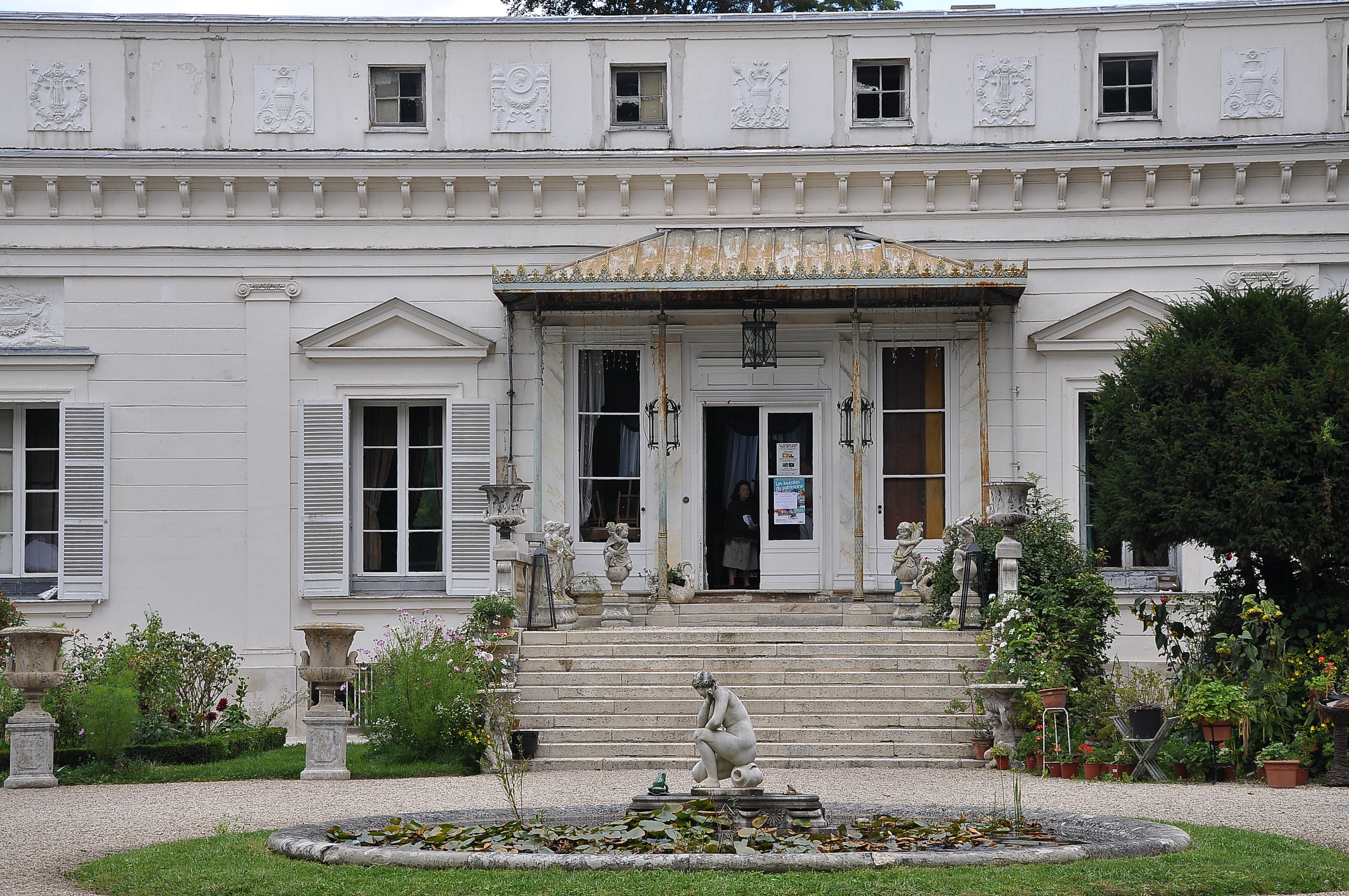
Entrance in the south façade

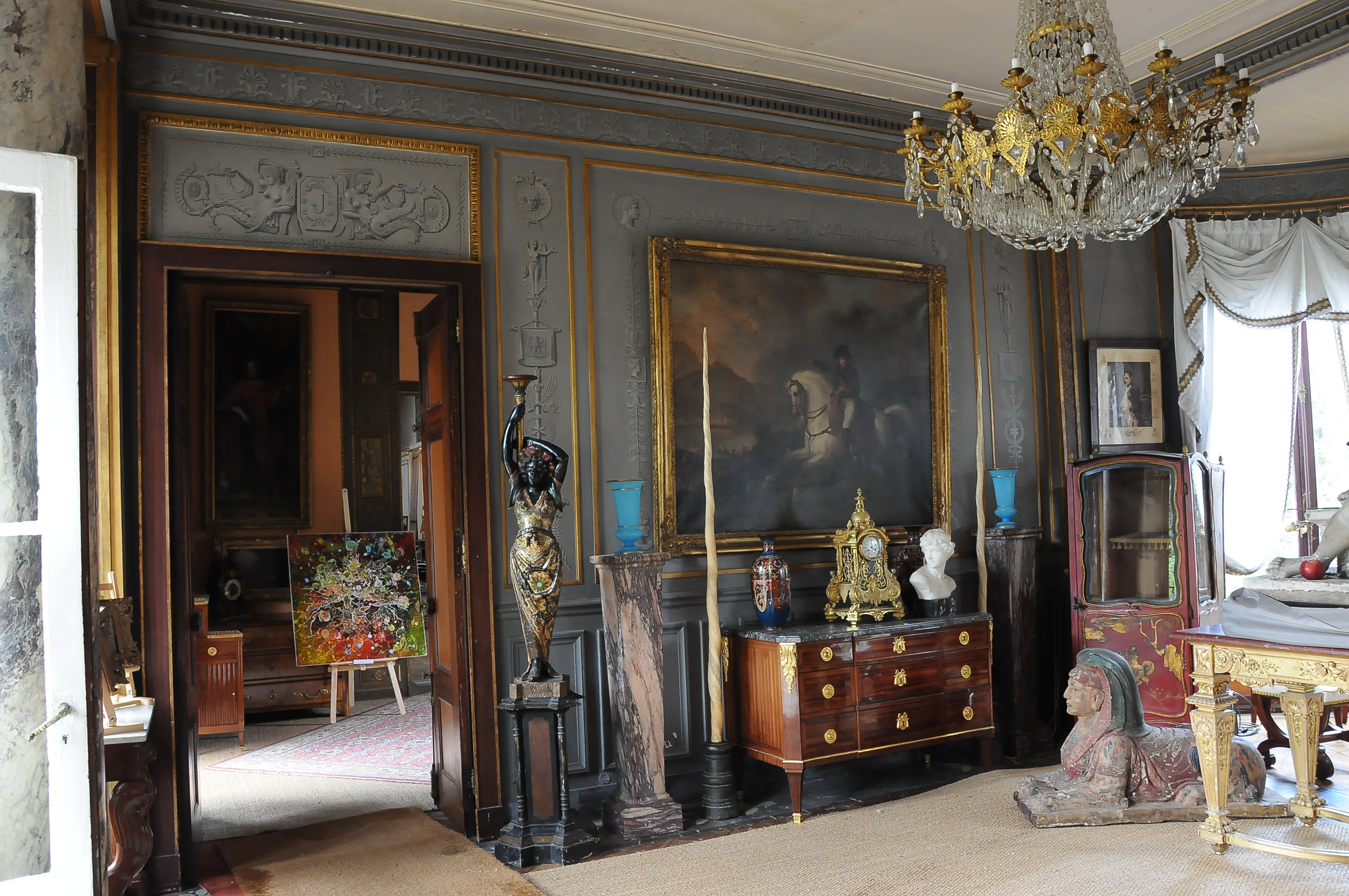
Interior decoration

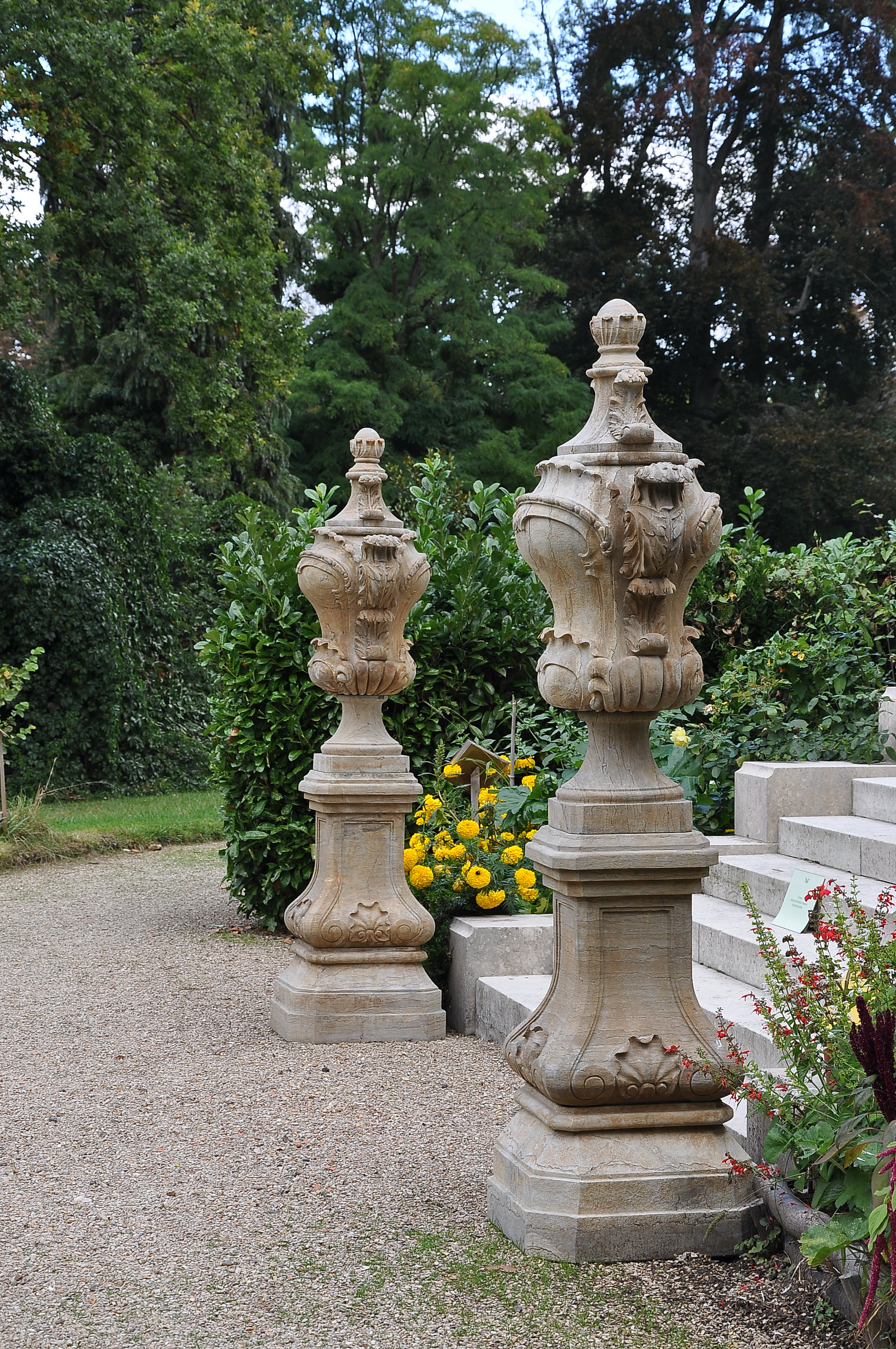
Decoration in the park

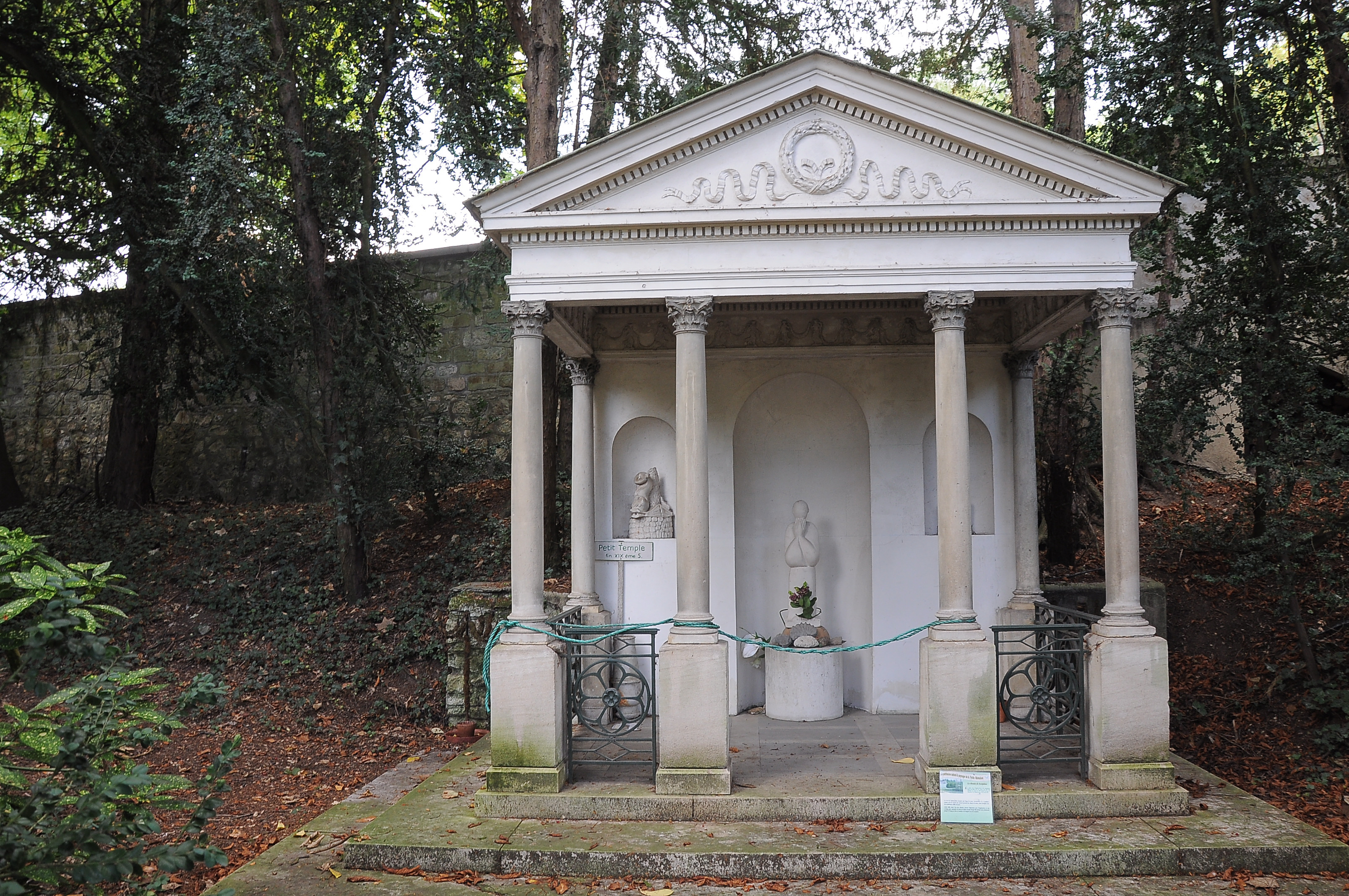
Temple in the park

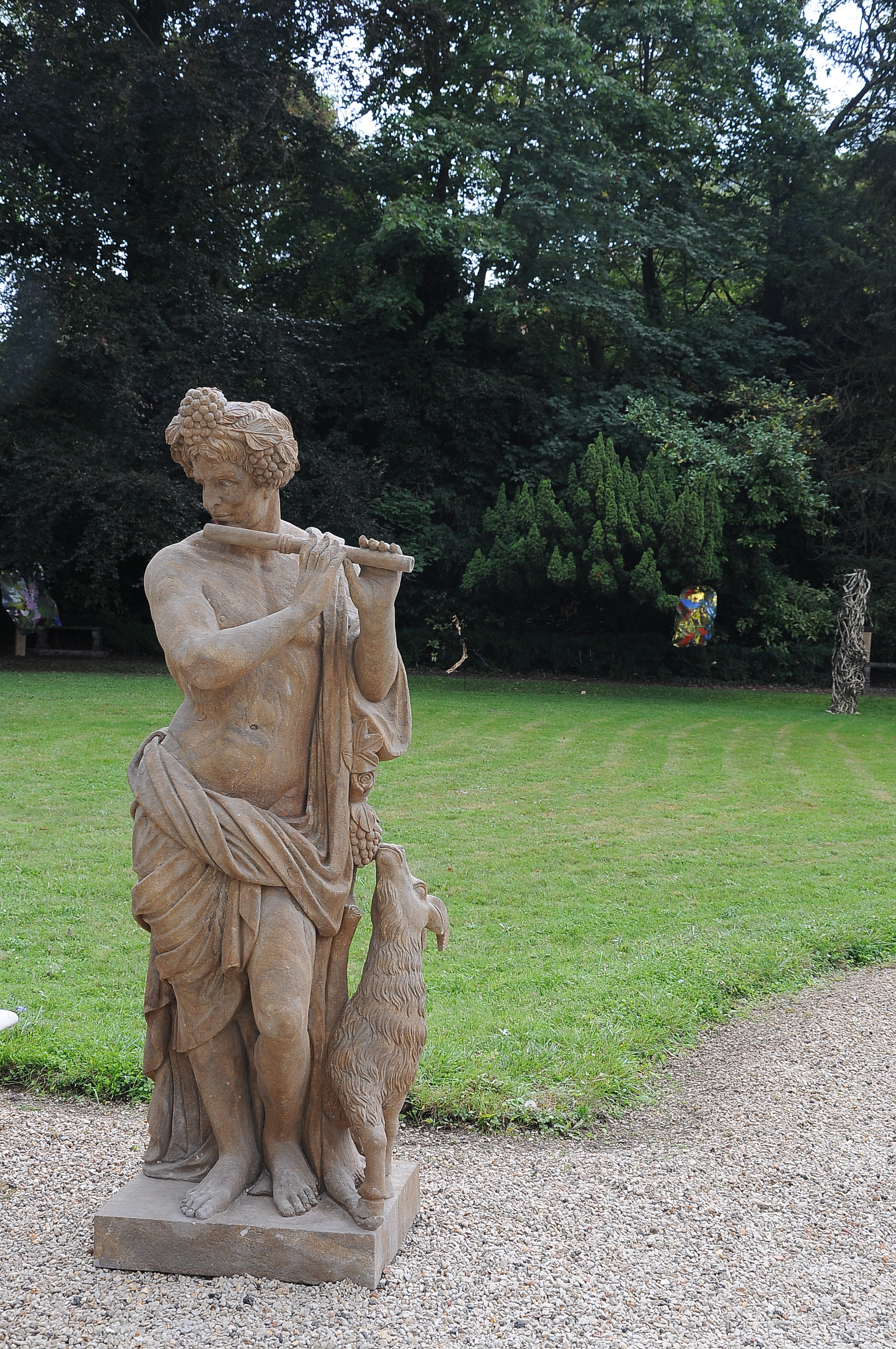
Statue in the south side of the park
