= Gabriel-Julien Ouvrard =

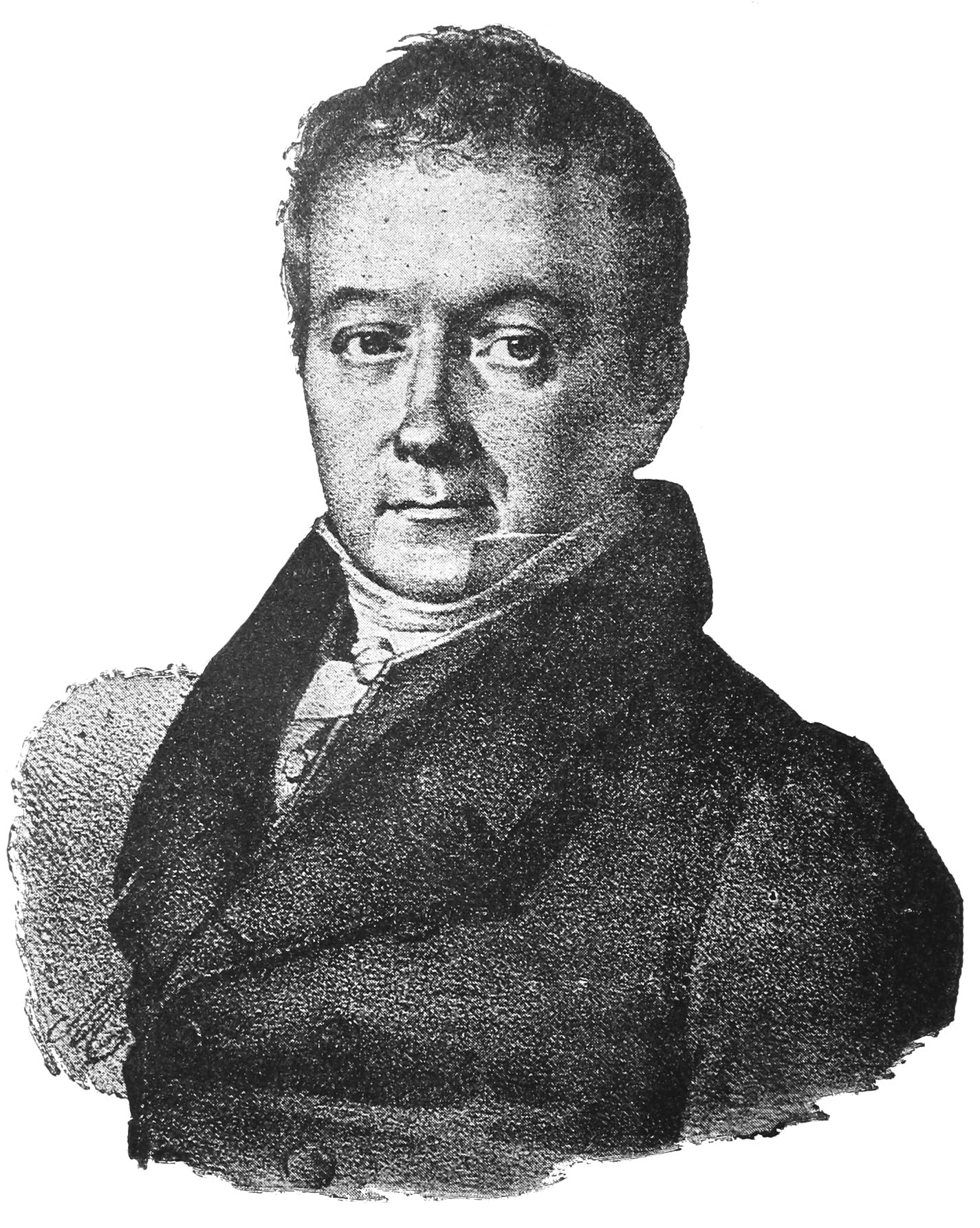
Portrait of Ouvrard

Gabriel-Julien Ouvrard (11 October 1770 – October 1846) was a French financier.

== Revolution (1787–1800) ==
The son of a paper mill owner, Gabriel-Julien Ouvrard received a basic education, joining a trading house in Nantes in 1787 as an employee. By the end of the Ancien Régime, the trading house was associated with Bordeaux shipowners Baour et Balguerie.

Under the Directoire, the trading house enriched itself considerably through colonial trade and military supplies. It then controlled three trading houses in Brest, Nantes and Orleans, the bank of Gamba, Gay et compagnie in Antwerp as well as having large shareholdings in three companies in Paris (Girardot et compagnie, Rougemont et compagnie, Charlemagne et compagnie). It was also associated with three major suppliers: Vanlerberghe (wheat), the Michel brothers (military supplies) and Carvillon des Tillières et Roy (steel and wood).

In 1794 he married the daughter of Jean Baptiste Tébaud, a wealthy Nantes merchant. (His wife died in 1818, having borne him three children.)

In September 1798, Ouvrard won a six-year contract for the provision of food to the Navy, representing a contract of 64 million francs. A few months later, he won a contract with the Spanish fleet stationed in Brest and then one to supply the army of Italy in 1799. He rented the Château du Raincy near Paris, which he subsequently bought in 1806.

Around 1799 he took as his mistress, Madame Tallien, daughter of Count Francois de Cabbarrus. Her family connections would prove useful to Ouvrard. He also had 5 illegitimate children with her.

Ouvrard was arrested on 27 January 1800 on the orders of then First Consul Napoleon Bonaparte, but a review of his accounts and contracts showed no irregularities. Ouvrard was released. He helped supply the army for its Marengo campaign.

== The Napoleonic Era (1801–1815) ==
Ouvrard was one of the founders of the Compagnie des Négociants Réunis along with the banker Médard Desprez (1764–1842), Regent of the Bank of France. In exchange for a cash advance, the company received valid obligations including monthly subsidies that Spain had to pay to France in implementing the Treaty of 22 June 1803. In 1804 the company had obtained from Spain its monopoly of trade with Spanish America. However the resumption of war between France and Britain slowed the movement of vessels. In 1805 the Bank of France faced collapse; this potential financial disaster was averted on 27 January 1806, when Ouvrard agreed to guarantee loans against the gold from the Spanish South America colonies.

Ouvrard then entered a period of financial difficulties. He could not raise the acquisition price of the Château du Raincy. In 1809, he was imprisoned in Sainte-Pélagie for unpaid debt and released three months later. Believing that only peace could bring maritime economic growth, he tried to negotiate a secret peace with Britain with the support of Louis Bonaparte and Joseph Fouché, which earned him three years in prison.

== Glory and ruin (1815–1846) ==
At the end of June 1815, at the beginning of the Restoration, Ouvrard acquired (under the name of his brother-in-law, G.J. Tébaud) the pavilion of Jonchère located at Bougival, known later as "Château de la Jonchère". He made many improvements to both the original building and its surroundings. In 1816, he acquired the Château de la Chaussée, not far from the pavilion of Jonchère.

Ouvrard played a large role in the economic recovery of France after the fall of the Empire. The Congress of Vienna in 1815 effectively forced France to pay 700 million francs to foreign powers, or 150 million per annum, to which had to be added the maintenance of 150,000 soldiers of the Allied armies that had occupied France for five years. In 1816, crops collapsed and the coffers of the kingdom were empty. The payments were suspended. The Duc de Richelieu, Prime Minister of Louis XVIII, found himself in front of the Chamber of Deputies (the famous Chambre introuvable) but found its quarrels and divisions made his task impossible. On the advice of Ouvrard, Richelieu created a 100 million pension that filled the coffers of the state. The payments were made and the threat that hung over France was lifted. With this payment, the Prime Minister put forward the departure of foreign troops expected in 1820. The French territory was released in 1818, after the Congress of Aix-la-Chapelle. The Duc de Richelieu visited Ouvrard's property and canceled its debt to the Treasury. Proof of the prestige which Ouvrard enjoyed at the time can be seen from the fact that both Louis XVIII and the future Charles X attended the wedding of Ouvrard's daughter Elisabeth to General de Rochechouart (a nephew of Richlieu) on 5 January 1822. The following year, the purveyor financed the shipment of Spain, but was never repaid in spite of agreements signed with the Duke of Angoulême, who commanded the expedition. Placed in bankruptcy, he then lost his entire fortune, and was even imprisoned at the Conciergerie for corruption. Ouvrard was exonerated through the intervention of the Duke of Angoulême, but never recovered his fortune.

He died in London in October 1846. He was survived by Dr Cabarrus, his illegitimate son by Madame Tallien, and his legitimate son, Julien Ouvrard.
