= Pépito (opera) =

One act opéra comique of 1853 with music by Jacques Offenbach

Jacques Offenbach by Nadar, c. 1860s

Pépito is a one act opéra comique of 1853 with music by Jacques Offenbach. The French libretto is by Léon Battu and Jules Moinaux, inspired by an 1825 vaudeville by Scribe.

== Performance history ==
Offenbach was director of music at the Comédie Française in the early 1850s, but desperate to gain recognition as a stage composer. He spent the summer of 1853 in Cologne with some of his family there to build his strength for battles ahead to win commissions and performances. Originally intended to be entitled Vertigo, Pépito received its premiere at the Théâtre des Variétés in Paris on 28 October 1853. The work was dedicated to Mme Émile Perrin (wife of the then director of the Paris Opéra-comique), and was published by Challiot with some cuts in December that year.

Pépito was revived in March 1856 at the Théâtre des Bouffes-Parisiens and was part of the company’s repertoire for the rest of the decade. A production was mounted at the Carltheater in Vienna (as Das Mädchen von Elizondo) after which it was seen in Germany and Hungary for many years following. The London premiere was on 24 June 1857, Vienna was on 18 December and Budapest first saw the piece on 1 June 1859. Later Offenbach works with a Spanish flavour include Les bavards and Maitre Peronilla.

== Roles ==
Role	Voice type	Premiere cast 28 October 1853 (Conductor:Jacques Offenbach)
Vertigo, hotelier	baritone	Leclère
Miguel a young Basque peasant	tenor	Beauge
Manuelita, a young orphan	soprano	Larcena

== Synopsis ==
A Basque village, Elizondo; to the left Vertigo’s inn ‘Au Crocodile’ – to the right Manuelita’s inn 'À l’Esperance'

The local factotum Vertigo (who introduces himself with an air parody of Figaro’s entrance in The Barber of Seville) is rebuffed by the beautiful hostess of the local inn, Manuelita. She has been putting aside her slim profits for when her fiancé Pépito returns from military service to wed her. A friend from her childhood returns to his home village – it is Miguel, who while talking to Manuelita becomes very attracted to her. He and Pépito are exchanging letters and when Manuelita is told that Pépito is in love she is sure he is devoted to her. To win Manuelita, Miguel invites her to eat a meal with him but he is interrupted by Vertigo who informs him that Manuelita is virtuous and cannot be talked round. Miguel schemes to get the older man drunk and then he Miguel, will be able to press his suit, which he does. However, his bold advances to Manuelita are rejected. Miguel is so impressed by Manuelita’s virtue and loyalty to Pépito that he determines to go and take the young soldier’s place, so that Pépito may return to marry Manuelita. However, when Vertigo comes back he remembers he has a letter to deliver to Miguel: it is from Pépito, who has now married his cantiniere. Manuelita decides to be content with Miguel, while Vertigo gives in on condition that he may play his serpent at their wedding.

== Musical numbers ==
- Overture
- « Il aimait notre vert feuillage » (Manuelita)
- « A tous les métiers moi j’excelle » (Vertigo)
- Romance « Un jour de détresse » (Manuelita)
- Duo « Si les filles de ce village » (Miguel & Manuelita)
- Trio « A table, à table »
- Romance « Jadis d’humeur légère » (Miguel)
- Duo « Un jour au pied de la madone » (Miguel & Manuelita)
- Finale « Adieu, Adieu »
