= Adèle d'Osmond =

French aristocrat and writer

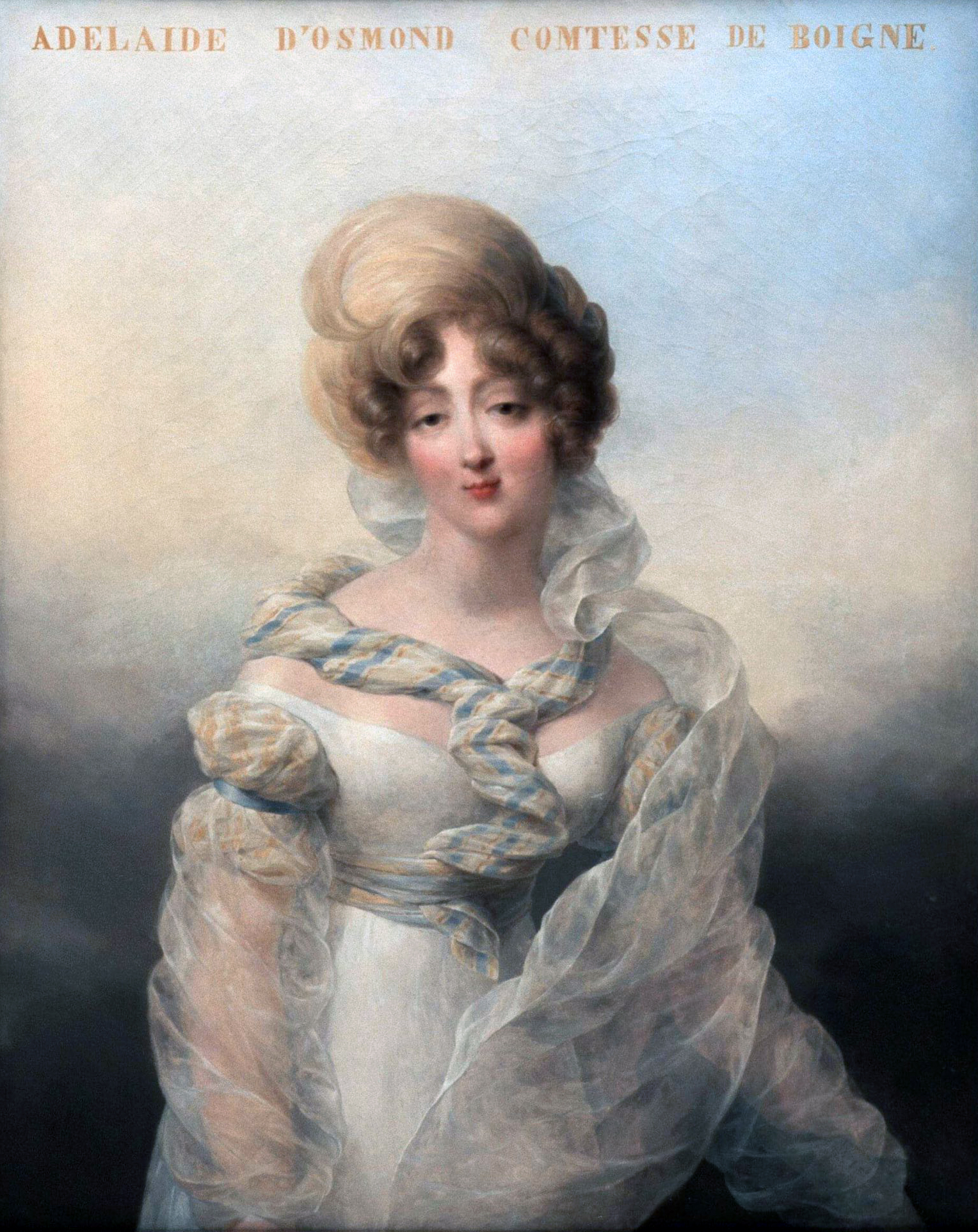
- Portrait of Adélaïde d'Osmond by Jean-Baptiste Isabey
- Born: Adélaïde Charlotte Louise Éléonore d'Osmond; 10 February 1781; Palace of Versailles, France
- Died: 10 May 1866 (aged 85); Paris, France
- Occupations: Aristocrat, saloniste, writer
- Known for: Memoirs

Adèle d'Osmond, Comtesse de Boigne (born Adélaïde Charlotte Louise Éléonore d'Osmond) (10 February 1781 – 10 May 1866) was a French aristocrat and writer. She was born and raised at the Palace of Versailles before her family went into exile in 1790 during the French Revolution. She returned to Paris in 1804 during the reign of Napoleon, and became prominent in society after the restoration of the Bourbons in 1814. She kept a brilliant salon in Paris in the 1830s and 1840s, and was later known for her memoirs describing life under the July Monarchy.

== Early years ==
Adélaïde Charlotte Louise Éléonore was born on 10 February 1781 in Versailles, daughter of René Eustache d'Osmond, 4th Marquis d'Osmond (1751–1838) and Eléanore Dillon (1753–1831). Her father was an officer in the French army, from a family that could be traced back to the 10th century. Her mother was the daughter of Robert Dillon, an Irishman. Eléonore Dillon became a lady in waiting to Louis XV's daughter Marie Adélaide, and Adèle was born and brought up at Versailles. The French Revolution broke out in 1789, and in 1790 the Osmonds left France for Italy, then moved to England.

In 1797 Adèle met the wealthy General Benoît de Boigne (1751–1830), thirty years her senior. De Boigne had served for several years under the Mahadji Scindhia, Maratha ruler of western India, and had made his fortune there. He arrived in England in April 1797, where he met Adèle, who was living in straitened circumstances with her parents. They married on 11 June 1798. From the start, the marriage was unhappy. Benoît de Boigne had not told Adèle that he already had an Indian wife and two children. In 1802 de Boigne returned to his native town of Chambéry, Savoy, where he bought a chateau. In 1804 Adèle and de Boigne were permanently separated.

Adele returned to France in 1804, staying in Paris with her parents while her husband mainly lived in Savoy. Until the fall of the Empire she was a member of the royalist circles that Napoleon tolerated. She became a friend of Madame de Staël and Madame Récamier.

== Bourbon monarchy ==
With the return of the Bourbons in 1814, Adèle d'Osmond rose to a leading position in society. She first followed his father, appointed ambassador to Turin and then to London, before finally settling in Paris, where an invitation to her salon became prized by the elite. In 1817 her brother, Rainulphe d'Osmond, Count and later Marquis d'Osmond (1787–1862), married the fabulously wealthy Aimée Caroillon des Tillières, owner of the Château de Pontchartrain. In Paris, Adèle d'Osmond ruled over a brilliant and very mixed salon, where the aristocracy mingled with the world of politics, diplomacy and literature. In summer she would sometimes stay at her father's Château de la Petite Roseraie in Châtenay-Malabry and his house in Trouville.

The July Monarchy (1830-1848) was to be the zenith of Adèle d'Osmond's glory. The Osmond family was closely linked to the Orleans family, and Adele herself was an intimate of the French queen, Marie-Amélie de Bourbon (1782–1866). With age, her salon took a distinctly political character. Starting in 1835, she wrote her famous memoirs, published in 1907 in an abridged version and in full in 1921, under the title Stories of an Aunt, Memoirs of the Countess de Boigne, born Osmond. It is a unique record of the July Monarchy. Marcel Proust was an enthusiastic reader, and was inspired by it to create the character of Madame de Villeparisis in À la recherche du temps perdu. Her novel Une Passion dans le grand monde, published in 1867 after her death, described the artificiality and corruption of the life led by high society.

Adèle d'Osmond was the mistress of Chancellor Étienne-Denis Pasquier. Camille de Montalivet wrote that it was commonly thought in the Tuileries and the Luxembourg that after the death of Mme Pasquier the Chancellor had married Mme Boigne in England. Montalivet believed in this secret marriage, and said that during the latter part of Pasquier's life the two lived together privately. She was also a friend of Count Carlo Andrea Pozzo di Borgo, ambassador of Russia to Paris, and Count Charles Robert de Nesselrode, Foreign Minister of the Tsar.

Adèle d'Osmond died in Paris on 10 May 1866, at the age of 85.

== Works ==
- d'Osmond Boigne, Louise-Eléonore-Charlotte-Adélaide. Récits d'une Tante: Mémoires de la Comtesse de Boigne, née d'Osmond (Complete). Library of Alexandria. ISBN 978-1-4655-4410-0.
- d'Osmond Boigne (comtesse de.), Éléonore-Adèle (1866). La Maréchale d'Aubemer, nouvelle du XVIIIe siècle. J. Claye.
- d'Osmond, Éléonore-Adèle (1867). Une passion dans le grand monde. M. Lévy. (Novel)
- Memoirs of the Comtesse de Boigne 1781-1814 (1907)
