= Claude Caroillon Destillières =

French industrialist and speculator

Claude-Xavier Caroillon-Destillières
- Born: 14 July 1748
- Died: May 1814 (aged 65)
- Occupations: Industrialist and speculator

Claude-Xavier Caroillon-Destillières (or Carvillon-Destillières, Carvillon des Tillières, occasionally Carvillon d'Estillière; (Note: The more aristocratic-sounding "Caroillon des Tillières" was changed to the commoner "Caroillon-Destillières" after the revolution.) 14 July 1748 – May 1814) was a French industrialist and speculator during the French Revolution and the subsequent First Empire, who took opportunity of the chaotic political situation to become immensely wealthy.

== Bourbon monarchy ==
Claude-Xavier Caroillon was born on 14 July 1748. He was the youngest of four sons of Nicolas Caroillon (or Carvillon), receiver general and businessman. The Caroillons were rich and ambitious owners of ironworks under the Bourbon monarchy, employing many workers in harsh conditions. The Caroillon brothers formed a company that invested in metal works in Berry and Perche, a region where the rights to operate such works belonged to Monsieur, the king's brother. The Carvillons were closely linked with Denis Diderot. Abel married his daughter Angélique, and Diderot was involved in their company. Claude Caroillon was recorded as one of those present at the funeral of Denis Diderot on 1 August 1784.

Claude Caroillon became receiver-general to Monsieur. He was counselor-secretary to the king in 1786. Claude Caroillon and his brothers were ennobled on the eve of the French Revolution, so-called "business aristocrats". The brothers were able to add the names of estates they purchased to their common surname. The eldest, Abel, became Caroillon de Vandeul, Claude-Xavier became Caroillon des Tillières, Théodore became Caroillon de Marville (or Melville), and Georges became Caroillon de la Charmotte. The brothers' partnership was dissolved at the start of the revolution, and Claude quarreled with his brother Abel Caroillon de Vandeul.

== Revolution and aftermath ==
The revolution of 1789 created huge opportunities for Caroillon-Destillières, who became one of the great financiers of the period. He already owned the forges and furnaces of Conches, and was able to purchase the forge of the Abbey of Lyre in 1791. He also owned the forge of Ferrière in partnership with Mathard. In July 1790, he became the commander of three companies of the National Guard in a ceremony at the Château de Saint-Assise. The Château was owned by Sir Philip Glower, a colonel of the English army and the heir of Elizabeth Pierrepont, Duchess of Kingston-upon-Hull. In February 1791, he married Françoise-Aimée Magallon d'Amirail, daughter of a Santo Domingo planter, in the chapel of Saint-Assise. That year, he purchased the château and its estate from Glower, who wanted to liquidate his French possessions due to political uncertainty. He began selling off parts of the estate.

Caroillon-Destillières's position became dangerous after the uprising of 1792. In 1793 he was imprisoned, but with the end of the Reign of Terror after 9 Thermidor (27 July 1794) he avoided the guillotine, and some time later he was released. He continued to sell off parts of the Saint-Assise estate, finally exchanging the château for another near Tournan-en-Brie in November 1795. The Caroillons became increasingly powerful during the transition from feudalism to capitalism that followed. Between 1794 and 1814, Caroillon and Jean Aubertot took control of a dozen establishments around Vierzon and in the Nièvre. Thus, in partnership with Jean Aubertot, Claude Caroillon owned an iron foundry at Mareuil-sur-Cher, 12 kilometers from Saint-Florent, from where the iron was shipped towards the lower Loire via the river Cher.

Caroillon-Destillières continued to speculate in property. In 1801, the Duchess of Brissac was destitute, owing large amounts to Destillières. She decided to sell the Château de Pontchartrain with 1,700 hectares (4,200 acres) of land, and on 19 April 1801 Destillières acquired the property for 1,600,000 francs. Under the empire, Caroillon acquired the Chateau and estate of Châteauneuf-sur-Cher, with an estimated value of close to 1.5 million francs. Destillières bought the Château du Raincy, and on 20 October 1806 resold it to Gabriel-Julien Ouvrard for 800,000 francs, payable in letters of exchange. Ouvrard was unable to redeem the letters, and on 2 September 1807 ownership of the château apparently reverted to Destillieres. He resold Raincy to the Princess Borghèse (Pauline Bonaparte). This transaction was the subject of a long-running legal dispute.

== Legacy ==
Caroillon-Destillières died in May 1814. His brother-in-law, the Count of Magallon, received a legacy worth 3,000 francs annually in his will dated 9 April 1812. His daughter Marie-Louise-Angélique-Aimée Carvillon Destillères (28 September 1797 – 2 August 1853) inherited his immense fortune. She also inherited some of the lawsuits over property. Since she was only seventeen, a minor, her family chose her maternal grandparents as guardians. This was again the subject of lawsuits, not resolved until 22 November 1816. In 1817 Marie-Louise married Charles-Eustache-Gabriel, Count and later Marquis d'Osmond (1787–1862), Lieutenant-General of Cavalry.
