= Jules Moinaux =

French writer, playwright and librettist

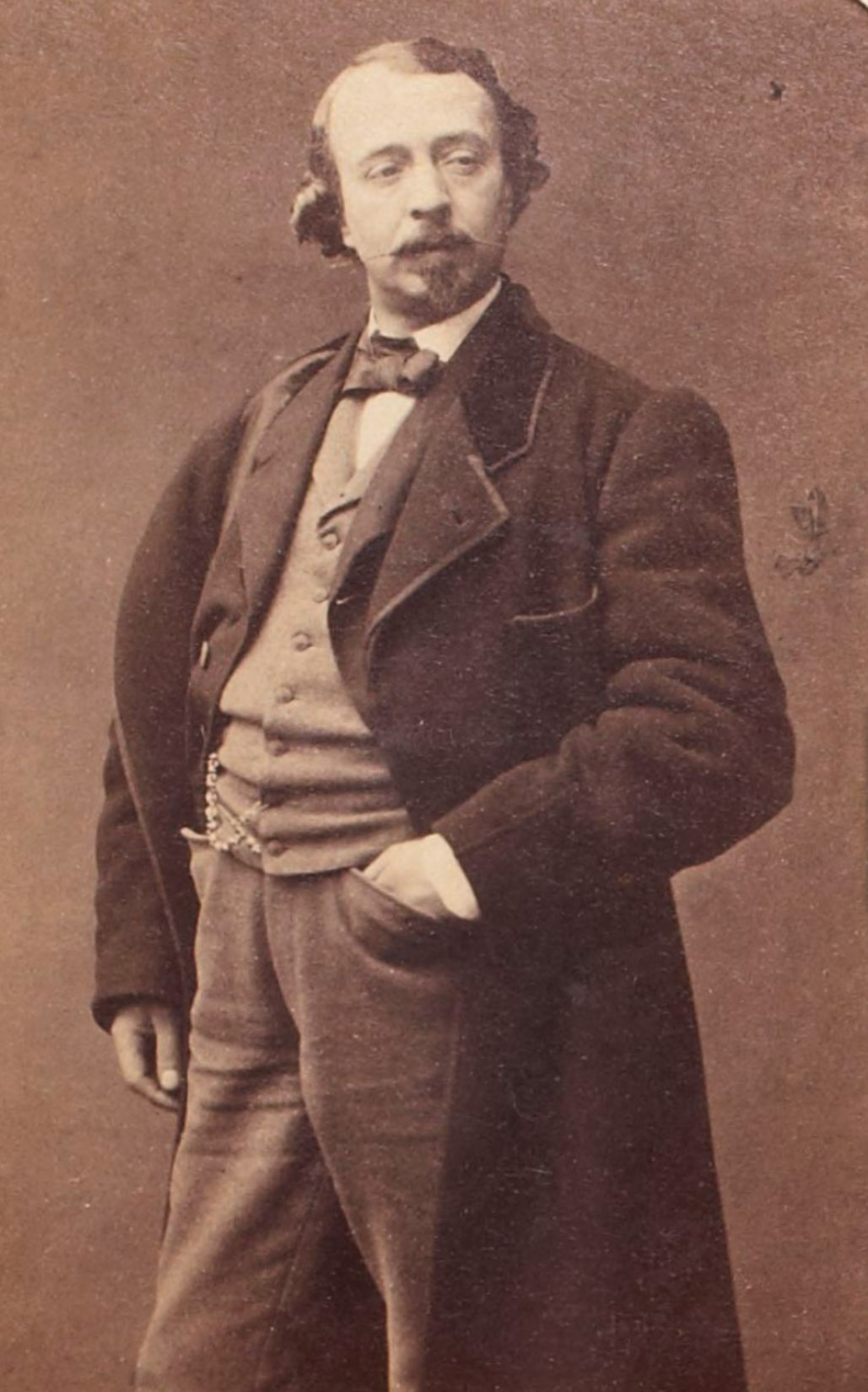
- Jules Moinaux c.1860
- Born: Joseph-Désiré Moineaux; 24 October 1815; Tours, France
- Died: 4 December 1895 (aged 80); Saint-Mandé, France
- Occupations: Writer; Playwright; Librettist

Jules Moinaux, real name Joseph-Désiré Moineaux or Moineau (24 October 1815 – 4 December 1895) was a 19th-century French writer, playwright, and librettist. Georges Courteline, whose civil status name was Georges Moinaux (or Moineau), was his son.

== Biography ==
The son of Joseph-Jacques Moineau, a cabinetmaker in Tours, Jules Moinaux began with learning the trade from his father. But soon, he preferred to live by his pen, and became a journalist and a writer-reporter at Palais de Justice, Paris.

By the late 1840s, he began writing, very often in collaboration, comic pieces that found success. In 1853, he wrote Pépito, an opéra comique for Jacques Offenbach, and in 1855, again for Offenbach, Les Deux Aveugles, a musical buffoonery.

In 1866, his comedy Les Deux Sourds was created at the Théâtre des Variétés in Paris. During the Franco-Prussian War, while he volunteered for the Fédération de la Garde nationale, he had an opéra bouffe, Le Canard à trois becs, presented with great success at the Folies-Dramatiques.

His judicial chronicles of the Criminal Court, written with verve for La Gazette des tribunaux, Le Charivari, etc., were collected in 1881 under the title Les Tribunaux comiques. His son Courteline sometimes drew inspiration from these for some of his own plays.

His satire of the police community, Le Bureau du Commissaire, was published in 1886 with a preface by Alexandre Dumas fils.

Le Monde ou l'on rit, his last work, was published in 1895. That collection of sketches featured among others Le Sourd qui n'avoue pas, On demande un malade gai, Le Rapia de Champigny, and L'Homme aux goûts champêtres.

He is buried at cimetière Sud de Saint-Mandé located in the 12th arrondissement of Paris.

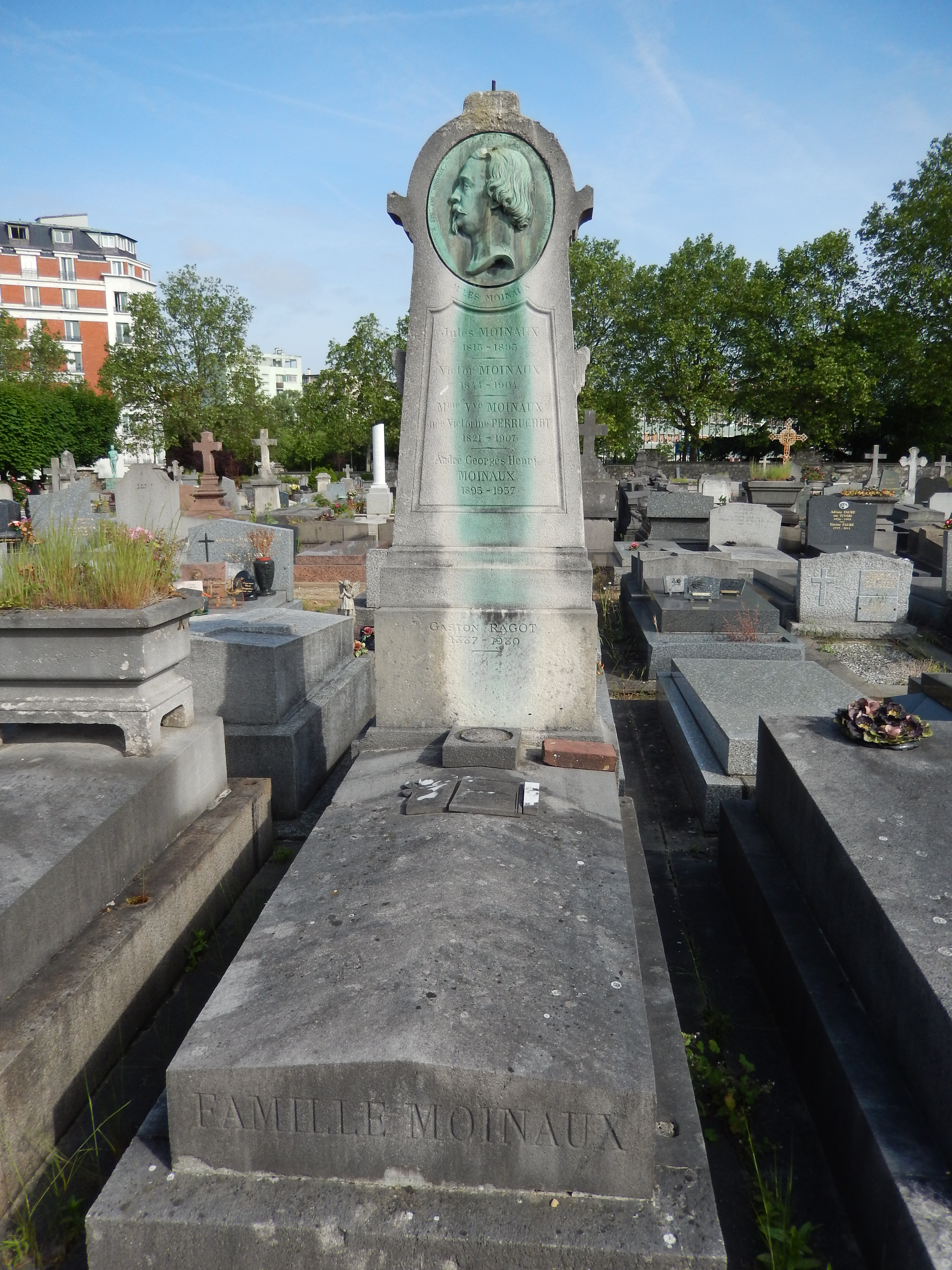
Jules Moinaux's grave at (cimetière de Saint Mandé Sud)

== Works ==
- 1846: La Cigale et la Fourmi
- 1849: La Conquête de la Chine, ode symphoni-charivarique
- 1850: Carrière politique d'un préfet de février, histoire de deux ans
- 1850: Une ordonnance de police, pot-pourri

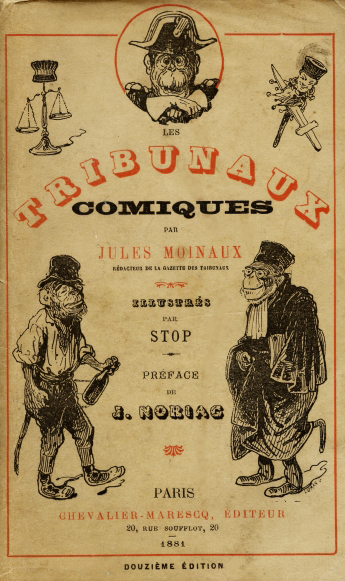
Les Tribunaux comiques, 1881

- 1853: Pépito, opéra comique, music by Jacques Offenbach
- 1854: La Question d'Orient, à-propos-vaudeville mingled with couplets
- 1854: Dromadard et Panadier en Orient, à-propos-vaudeville
- 1855: Les Deux Aveugles, bouffonnerie musicale, music by Jacques Offenbach
- 1855: Les Gueux de Béranger, drama mingled with song
- 1857: La Botte secrète, folie-vaudeville
- 1858: Les Désespérés, one-act opéra comique
- 1858: L'Ut dièse, one-act bouffonnerie
- 1859: Le Zouave, récits et correspondances militaires
- 1859: La Clarinette mystérieuse, comédie en vaudeville
- 1861: Paris quand il pleut, comédie en vaudeville
- 1861: Le Voyage de M. Dunanan père et fils, opéra-bouffe
- 1861: Le Monsieur de la rue de Vendôme, one-act comédie en vaudeville
- 1862: Le Café de la rue de la Lune, one-act folie-vaudeville
- 1862: Le Secret du rétameur, one-act comédie en vaudeville
- 1862: Le Mari d'une étoile, two-act folie-vaudeville
- 1863: Les Géorgiennes, three-act opéra-bouffe, music by Jacques Offenbach read online, A. Lemerre
- 1864: Le Joueur de flûte, vaudeville romain, musique gauloise by Hervé
- 1864: Eh ! Lambert !, à-propos-vaudeville
- 1864: Les Marionnettes de l'amour, three-act comedy
- 1865: Les Campagnes de Boisfleury, one-act comédie en vaudeville
- 1866: Les Deux Sourds, comedy
- 1867: L'Homme à la mode... de Caen
- 1868: Les Abrutis du feuilleton, one-act bouffonnerie

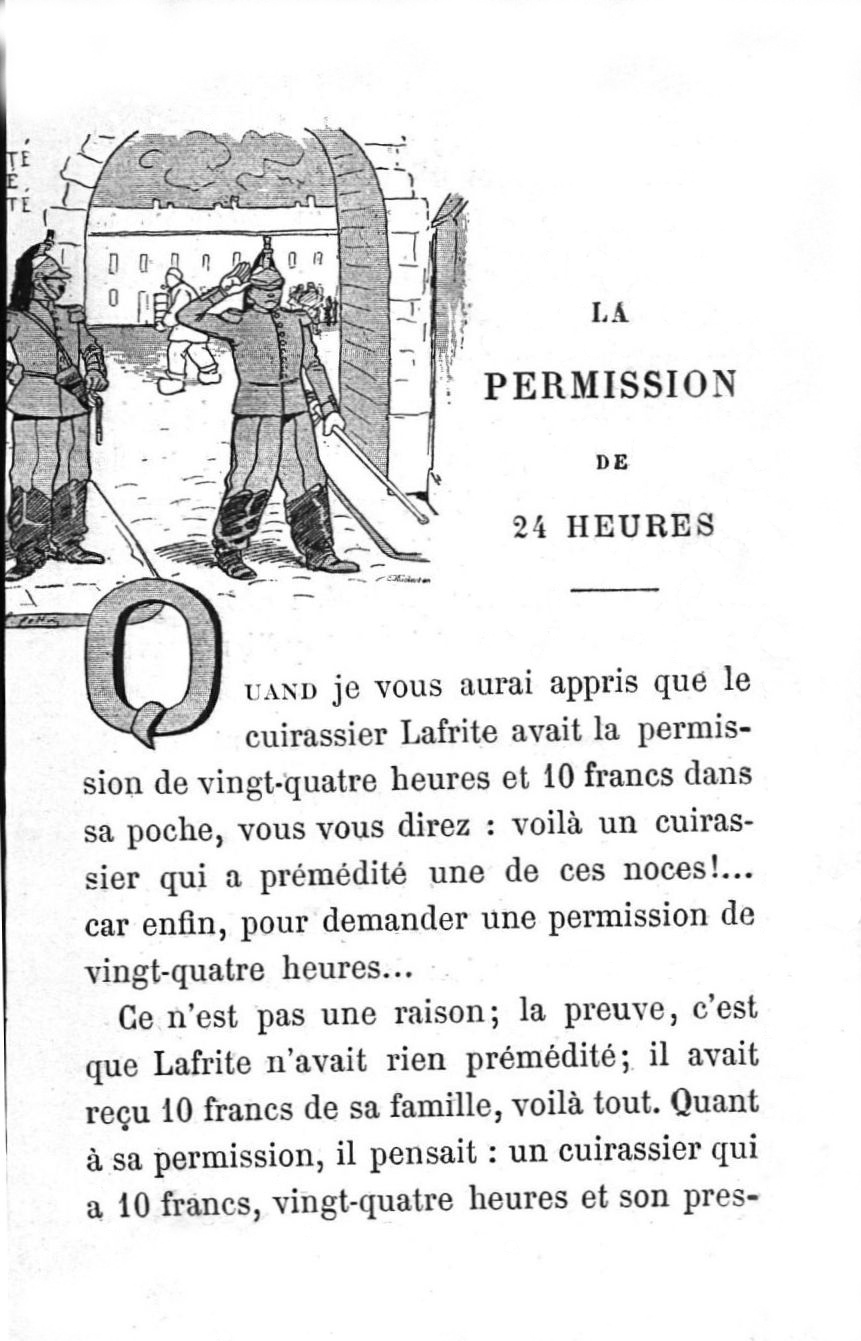
Le Monde où l'on rit, illustrations Eugène Cottin

- 1868: La Permission de minuit, tableau militaire
- 1869: La Foire d'Andouilli, tableau populaire
- 1869: L'Astronome du Pont-Neuf, one-act pochade musicale
- 1870: Le Ver rongeur, three-act play
- 1870: Le Joueur de flute, vaudeville romain
- 1870: Le Canard à trois becs, opéra-bouffe
- 1871: Le Testament de Monsieur Crac, opéra-bouffe
- 1874: Les Parisiennes, four-act opéra-bouffe
- 1875: La Cruche cassée, opéra comique
- 1876: Le Jeu de l'amour et du... houzard, one-act comédie en vaudeville
- 1877: La Sorrentine, three-act opéra comique
- 1880: Les Mouchards, five-act play
- 1881: Les Tribunaux comiques, édition définitive
- 1881: Ça fait toujours plaisir
- 1886: Le Bureau du commissaire, foreword by Alexandre Dumas fils
- 1886: Un conseil judiciaire, three-act comedy
- 1886: Le Bracelet, one-act comedy
- 1888: Les Nouveaux Contes du Palais par la presse judiciaire parisienne
- 1888: Les Gaietés bourgeoises
- 1892: Le Monsieur au parapluie, novel
- 1894: Les Tribunaux du bon vieux temps, Causes grasses et causes salée
- 1895: Le Monde ou l'on rit

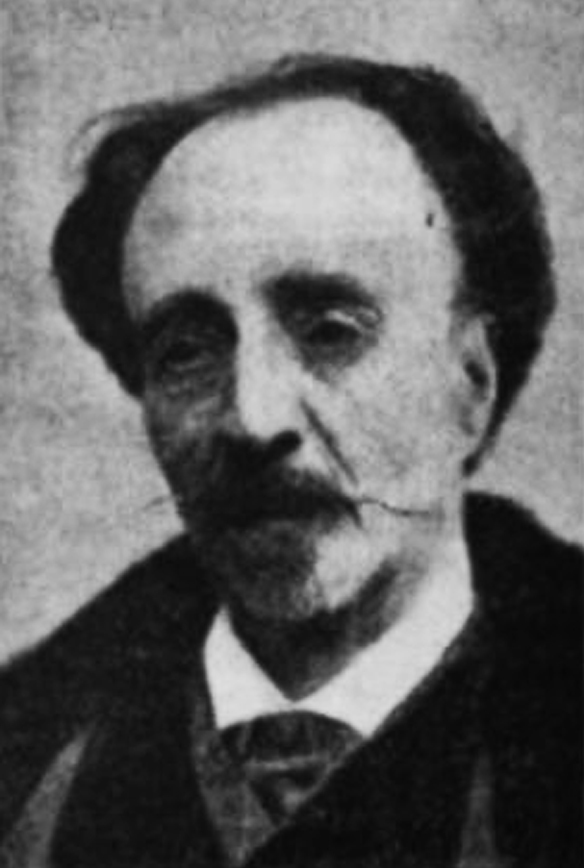
Jules Moineau c. 1885
