= Château du Raincy =

Former castle in current-day Le Raincy, France

Coordinates: 48°53′49″N 2°30′56″E

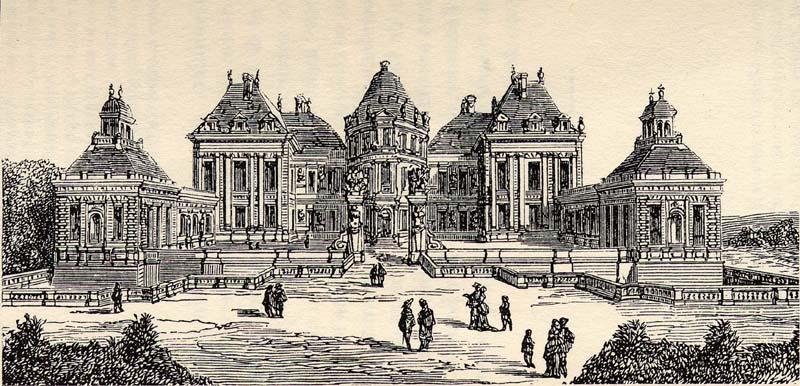
View of the estate in the 18th century

The Château du Raincy (French pronunciation: [ʃɑto dy ʁɛ̃si]) was built between 1643 and 1650 for Jacques Bordier, Intendant des finances, following the Baroque plans drawn by architect Louis Le Vau on the site of a Benedictine priory on the road from Paris to Meaux, in the present-day commune of Le Raincy in the Seine-Saint-Denis department of France. It was destroyed in 1819.

== The Château ==
Louis Le Vau was put in charge of the design of the building. The gardens are traditionally ascribed to André Le Nôtre and the interior decoration to Charles Le Brun. This team of masters also worked on the châteaux at Vaux-le-Vicomte and Versailles.

Surrounded by five pavilions and a network of dry moats, the Château du Raincy was at the heart of a private estate imbued with royal magnificence. The monumental stables could accommodate 200 horses. After Bordier added the adjacent territory of the seigneurie of Bondy to it, the park of 240 hectares was one of the most extensive in the vicinity of Paris.

Bordier's expenses amounted to the exorbitant sum of 4,500,000 livres, swallowing up his fortune. After Bordier's death in 1660, his son and heir, Hilaire, was constrained to sell the property to Princess Palatine, Anna Maria Gonzaga in 1663. In November 1664 Molière's troupe was commanded to perform at Le Raincy by her son-in-law, the prince de Condé. After her death, in 1684, the estate passed to her daughter, Anne Henriette of Bavaria (1648–1723). Ten years later, Anne's husband, prince Henri Jules de Bourbon-Condé, ceded the property to Louis Sanguin, marquis du Livry, premier maître d'hôtel du Roi et capitaine des chasses; joining the domain to his of Livry, the house became known as the Château de Livry.

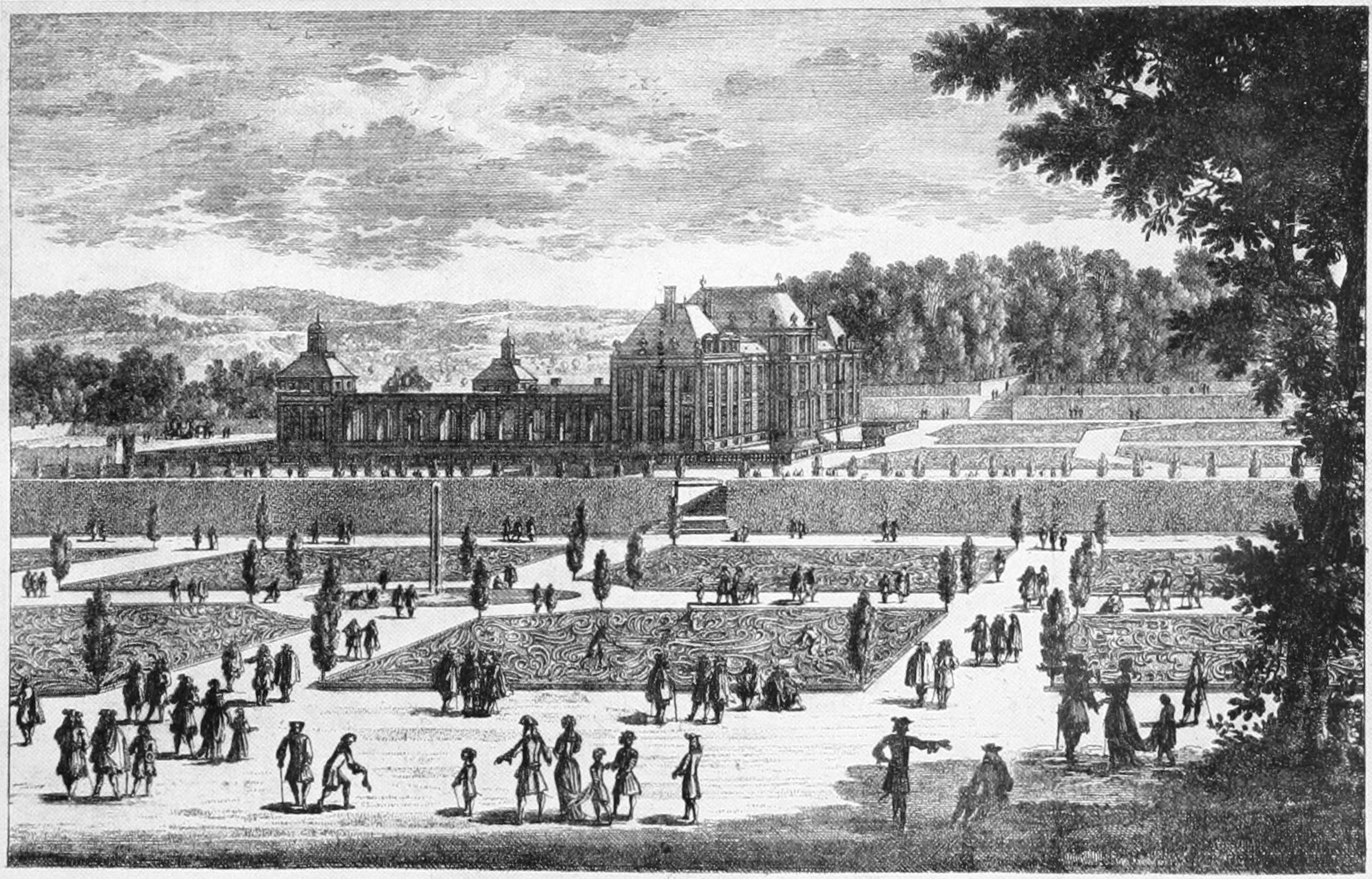
A 17th-century view of the Château and gardens, engraved by a member of the Perelle family

In 1769, the château was purchased by Louis Philippe d'Orléans, who had both the garden and interiors upgraded. His heir, Philippe-Égalité, engaged the Scottish gardener Thomas Blaikie to replace the formal gardens with a more natural landscape, one of the first jardins à l'anglaise in France. The park was dotted with numerous follies, including an "old tower", a "farm", a decorative kennel, an hermitage, and the celebrated Maisons Russes, scored to imitate Russian isbas (log houses). One was open to visitors as the "caffé Restorateur du Reinci dans le goût Russe" as a contemporary engraving labels it; To add to the ambience of its parc à l'anglaise, the waiters spoke English.

== Revolution, First Empire ==
During the French Revolution, the demesne was confiscated by the government and then passed through a succession of owners. Madame Récamier hosted brilliant fêtes at Le Raincy under the Directoire. Neglected and left in a bad state of disrepair since that period, the château designed by Le Vau was demolished and replaced by a conventional neoclassical building in the first decade of the 19th century, at the time of Napoléon I's First Empire, as can be seen in an engraving from 1808. Napoleon I acquired Le Raincy in 1812, but the Prussian army quartered there in 1815. The new château fell into neglect and was eventually demolished in 1819.

== Restoration, July Monarchy, Second Empire ==
During the Restoration (1815–1830), Le Raincy reverted to the House of Orléans. During his reign, known as the July Monarchy (1830–1848), King Louis Philippe used the grounds for hunting, while his retinue would stay at the Maisons Russes. At the beginning of the Second Empire, by decrees of January 22 and March 27, 1852, the Orléans were dispossessed of their Raincy estate which became a domaine d'État. Houses began to be built in the park and in 1869, they formed the town of Le Raincy.

Nowadays, very little subsists of Bordier's estate. The statues of Henri II, Charles IX, Henri III, and Henri IV were transferred to the Louvre; the farm was converted into the Saint-Louis church; only a part of the orangery is still visible.
