= Rainulphe d'Osmond =

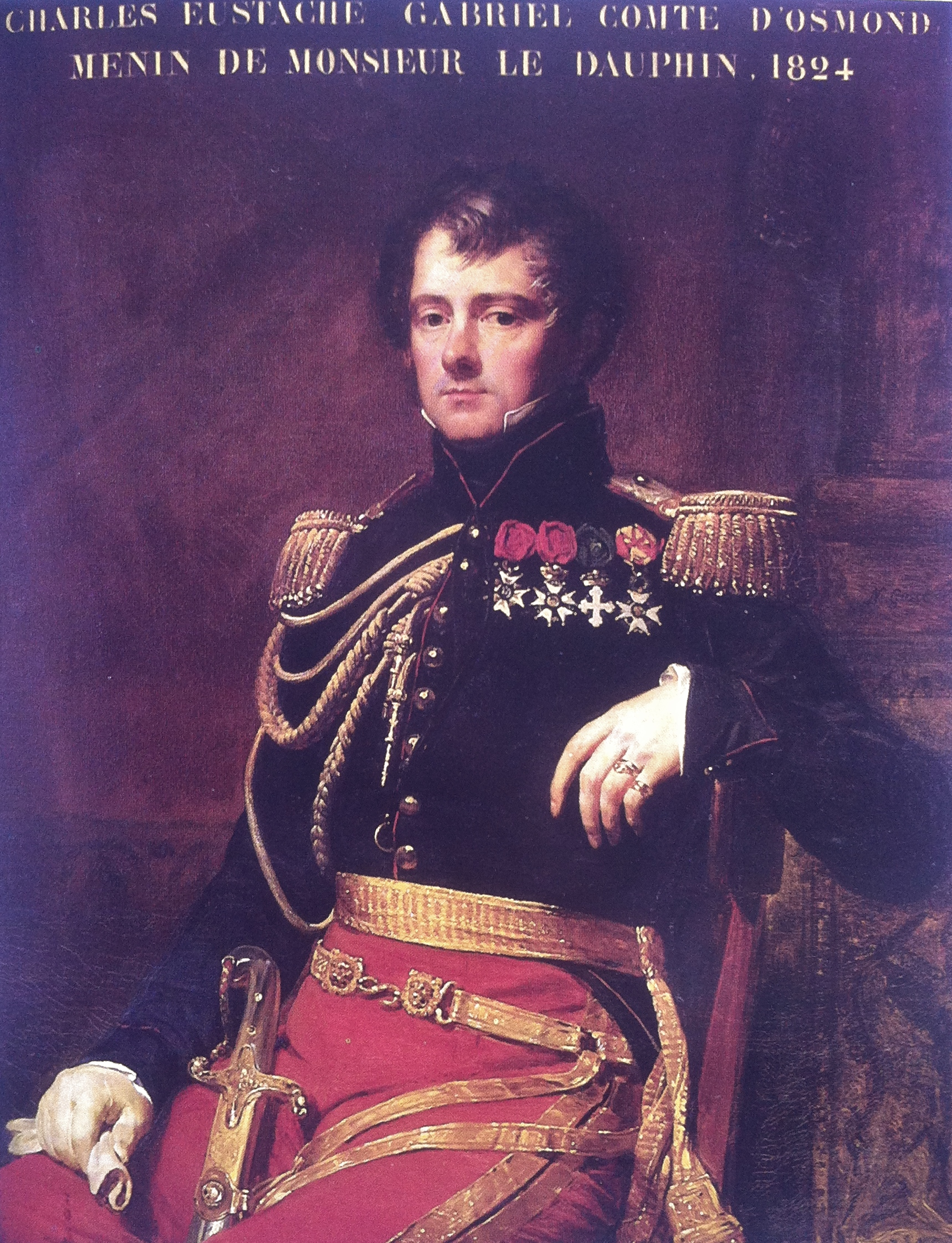
Portrait of Charles Eustache Gabriel "Rainulphe", comte d'Osmond, by Nicolas Gosse, 1824

Charles Eustache Gabriel (29 July 1788 - October 1862), known as Rainulphe d'Osmond, count then 5th Marquis (1838) of Osmond. He was one of the menins (essentially a young nobleman who was made a companion of royal children) to duc d'Angoulême (Dauphin of France from the accession of Charles X in 1824).

== Career ==
As recorded in the memoirs of Queen Hortense, he asked for the post of Chamberlain to Holland, but was denied by the King of Holland Louis Bonaparte (the younger brother of Napoleon, Emperor of the French).
