= June 1912 =

Month of 1912

<<	June 1912					>>
Su	Mo	Tu	We	Th	Fr	Sa
						1
2	3	4	5	6	7	8
9	10	11	12	13	14	15
16	17	18	19	20	21	22
23	24	25	26	27	28	29
30

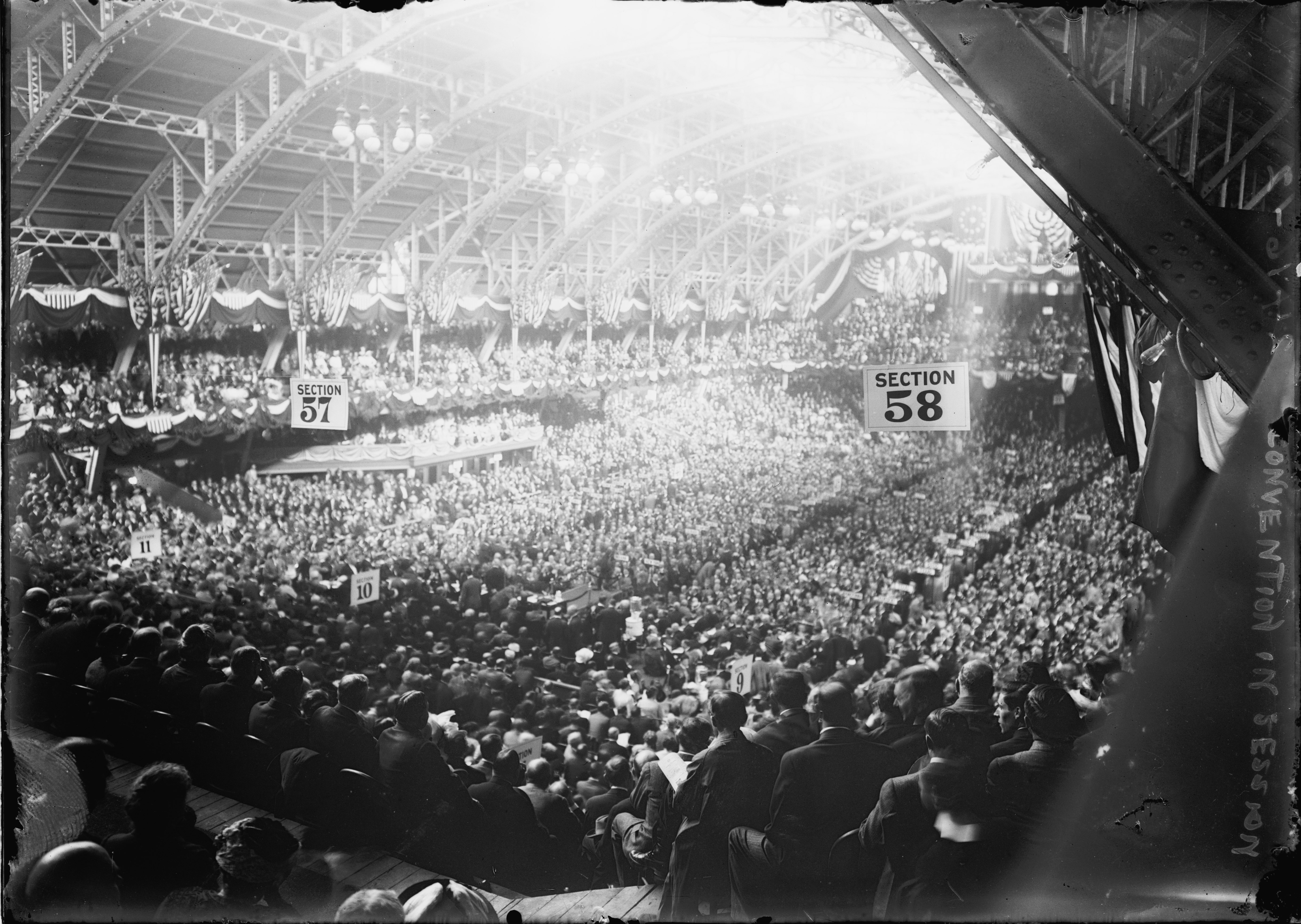
June 22, 1912: Incumbent U.S. President William Howard Taft nominated ahead of former U.S. President Theodore Roosevelt by Republicans

June 8, 1912: Columbus Memorial unveiled in Washington DC

The following events occurred in June 1912:

== June 1, 1912 (Saturday) ==
- The Stockholm Olympic Stadium was inaugurated for the 1912 Summer Olympics.
- The first air flight held in Norway was completed by Royal Norwegian Navy officer Hans Dons who piloted a monoplane designed by Etrich Taube over Borre in Vestfold county. He completed a 48 kilometres (30 mi) flight a week later over Horten.
- French troops killed 600 Moroccan tribesmen who had marched on Fez to oppose the French Protectorate in Morocco. Governor Hubert Lyautey ordered artillery to be used against the lesser armed opposition.
- The first streetcars crossed the new Lechmere Viaduct and ran on the elevated Causeway Street line in Boston.
- A premature detonation of dynamite killed 18 men who were working on construction of the Canadian Northern road, near Lake Opinicon, Ontario.
- The first gasoline filling station in the United States to use an enclosed gas pump opened at Oak Street and Young Street in Columbus, Ohio, dispensing Standard Oil gas. Gas stations had opened as early in 1905 in St. Louis, with gasoline dispensed by "a hose from a tall tank."
- American pilot Philip Orin Parmelee, 24, was killed in a plane crash while performing in an air show at Yakima, Washington. Parmalee ignored requests to postpone his flight until heavy winds died down, and his plane dropped from a height of 400 feet (120 m).
- The Famous Players Film Company, which would merge in 1916 with the Lasky Feature Play Company to form Paramount Pictures, was founded by Adolph Zukor.
- Born:
  - Evie Hayes, American-born Australian actress, best known for her collaborations with Will Mahoney; in Seattle, Washington (d. 1988)
  - Justin O'Byrne, Australian politician, President of the Senate of Australia 1974 to 1975; in Launceston, Tasmania (d. 1993)
- Died:
  - William Wilson, 67, British swimmer who developed the game water polo and was a pioneer of swimming instruction (b. 1844)
  - Daniel Burnham, 65, American architect, co-creator of the Burnham Plan of Chicago and director of the 1893 World's Columbian Exposition (b. 1846)
  - Philip Orin Parmelee, 24, American aviator, was killed in a plane crash.

== June 2, 1912 (Sunday) ==
- Official results of the parliamentary elections in Belgium gave the Catholic Party of Charles de Broqueville, in power for 28 years without interruption, 101 seats and increasing its majority in the Chamber of Representatives. The Catholic Party also retained a majority in the Belgian Senate. The results led to protests nationwide.
- The first contest for a human-powered flying machine was sponsored by Robert Peugeot and attracted 23 entrants, none of which were able to leave the ground. Peugeot then offered a competition on July 4 for any plane that could stay 10 centimeters off the ground for a distance of 100 meters.
- Chicago, Lake Shore and South Bend Railroad, predecessor of the Chicago South Shore and South Bend Railroad, began "one-car" passenger service directly to the Chicago Loop.

== June 3, 1912 (Monday) ==
- German warships, led by the battle cruiser SMS Moltke, were received at Hampton Roads, Virginia, by U.S. President William Howard Taft.
- A fire in Istanbul destroyed 2,000 houses, four mosques and seven schools.

== June 4, 1912 (Tuesday) ==
- Massachusetts became the first U.S. state to pass a law authorizing a guaranteed minimum wage; the law would take effect on July 1, 1913, provided only that a state commission would issue regulations. Eight other states followed in 1913, with Utah being third, but having its law taking effect first, immediately upon passage on March 18, 1913. The Massachusetts law applied only to women and children, and penalties for its violation were light. Oregon, whose law passed second, would become the first state to have orders implementing a wage.
- Canada agreed to join in the celebration of 100 years of Anglo-American peace since the War of 1812 had been fought in Canada and in the United States.
- The Atala-Dunlop team that finished with Carlo Galetti, Eberardo Pavesi, and Giovanni Micheletto won the 4th Giro d'Italia stage bicycle race.
- Born: Robert Jacobsen, Danish artist, member of the COBRA avant-garde movement in Denmark; in Copenhagen, Denmark (d. 1993)
- Died: Royal C. Taft, 89, American politician, Governor of Rhode Island 1888 to 1889 (b. 1823)

== June 5, 1912 (Wednesday) ==
- A group of 570 U.S. Marines landed in Cuba at Caimanera, the first group sent to protect American citizens on the island. After rebel leader Evaristo Estenoz was killed on June 27, the Marines would withdraw on August 5.
- After using "whistles, trumpets, rattles, or other instruments of the most discordant character" to shout down debates over the Army Bill, 75 members of the opposition party in Hungary were expelled by police, leaving a quorum from Prime Minister István Tisza's National Party, which passed the Army Bill. By the end of October, Tisza's powers would be extended to allow him to send a guard unit to use force against Members of Parliament as necessary.
- Mexico's President Francisco I. Madero and the Standard Oil Company agreed to allow Standard Oil to operate in Mexico tax-free for ten years, and the rights to eminent domain over any private or public property it wished to obtain to support its oil fields in four Mexican states.
- Tsuruko Haraguchi was awarded a PhD in psychology from Columbia University, becoming the first Japanese woman to earn a PhD in any field.
- Died:
  - George S. Nixon, 52, American politician, U.S. Senator for Nevada since 1905, died of spinal meningitis contracted following surgery (b. 1860)
  - Frank Gillen, 56, Australian anthropologist, known for his collaboration with Walter Baldwin Spencer on the Indigenous Australians in Central Australia (b. 1855)

== June 6, 1912 (Thursday) ==
- The Novarupta volcano was formed by an eruption in Alaska, dumping a foot of ashes at Kodiak and on other villages on Woody Island, killing hundreds of people. The 200 inhabitants of villages on the mainland near Shelikof Strait were gone when the tugboat Redondas arrived. The villages of Kanatuk, Savinodsky, Douglas, Cold Bay, Kamgamute and Katmai were empty. The revenue cutter Manning rescued 500 survivors left homeless by the volcano. This was the largest eruption of the century and produced 35 cubic kilometers of pumice, burying the Ukak River valley to a depth of 200 meters within sixty hours; steam and gas persisted for decades in the Valley of Ten Thousand Smokes. The explosion was heard in Juneau, Alaska, 750 miles away, and spread an ash cloud of 100,000 square miles, with traces of dust found as far east as Algeria. Eruptions lasted until July 8.
- The tanker SS Ottawa recovered the body of steward William Thomas Kerley, who died in the sinking of the Titanic. After identification, his body was buried at sea.
- Born: Maria Montez, Dominican-American actress, known for her lead roles in Arabian Nights and Cobra Woman; as María África Gracia Vidal in Barahona, Dominican Republic (d. 1951)

== June 7, 1912 (Friday) ==
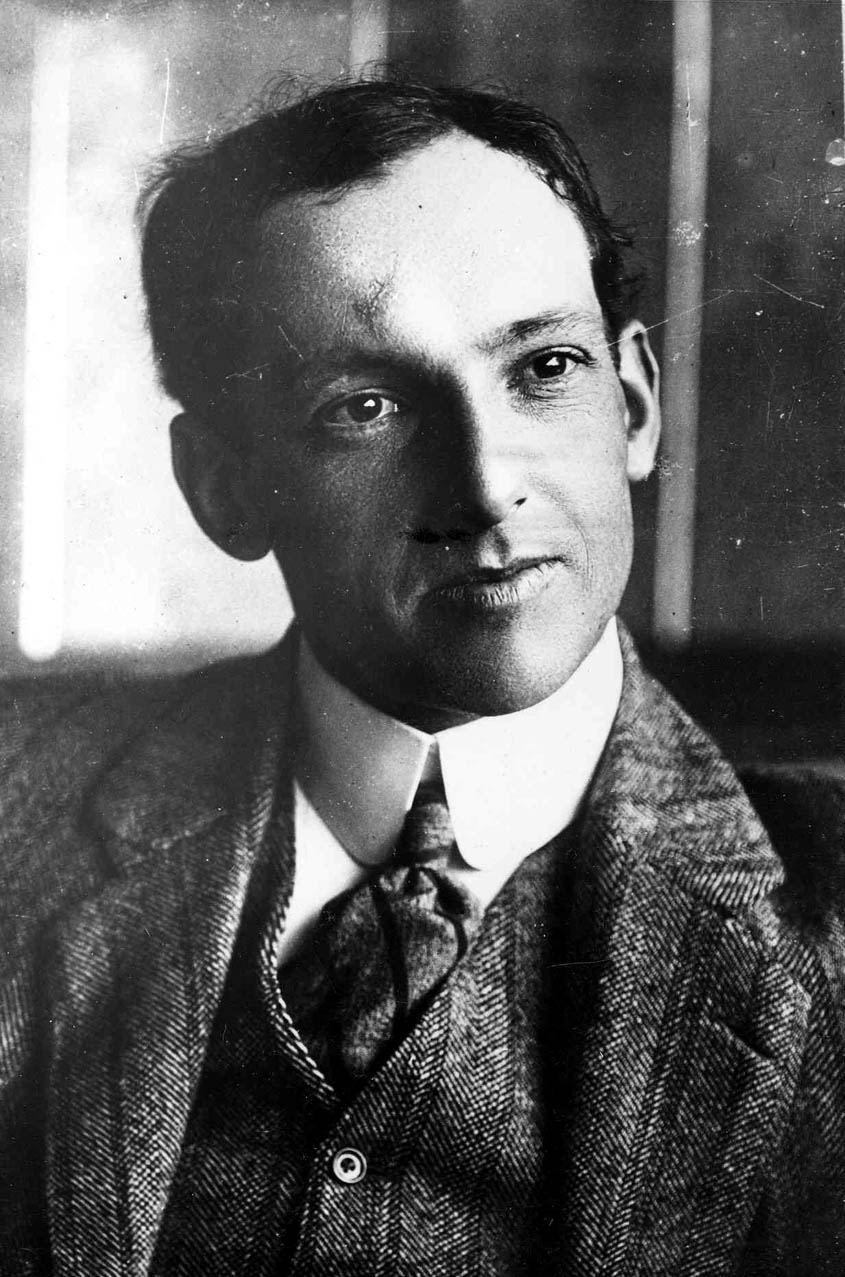
French aviator Hubert Latham

- Gyula Kovács, a legislator in the Hungarian House of Deputies, fired three gunshots at Prime Minister István Tisza on the floor of Parliament, missed, and then shot himself. Tisza had just rid the chamber of opposition deputies and remarked, "Now that the House is cleared... we will proceed to work." Kovacs shouted out, "There is still a member of the Opposition in the House," while firing his gun before turning it on himself.
- A 7.0 magnitude earthquake shook Alaska at 9:26 pm, as eruptions of Mount Katmai continued.
- Thirty soldiers and workmen were killed and 100 injured in an explosion of gunpowder at the Wöllersdorf ammunition factory near Wiener Neustadt, Austria-Hungary.
- Died: Hubert Latham, 29, French aviation pioneer, was fatally injured by a water buffalo while hunting in Africa. Latham had been with natives deep into the French Sudan, near the Bahr as Salamat and Lake Chad on the Chari River, when he shot the buffalo. The wounded animal then charged Latham, goring and then trampling him. News did not reach the French Equatorial Africa Governor-General, Martial Henri Merlin, until six weeks later. (b. 1883)

== June 8, 1912 (Saturday) ==
- An Italian force of 12,000 soldiers were defeated by Turkish-Arab troops at Zanzur in Tripolitania during the Italo-Turkish War, despite suffering between 1,000 and 1,400 casualties.
- The French submarine Vendémiaire was rammed by the battleship Saint Louis, drowning 25 sailors near Cherbourg, France.
- The first annual Aerial Derby took place, sponsored by the Daily Mail. Seven participants flying a single circuit of an 81-mile (130-kilometer) course, starting and finishing at Hendon Aerodrome in London, with control points at Kempton Park, Esher, Purley, and Purfleet. A crowd of 45,000 spectators paid to attend the event, and larger numbers of people watched the race along its route. Thomas Sopwith won the derby flying a Bleriot aircraft with a time of 1 hour 23 minutes 8.4 seconds, winning £250 and a gold cup.
- Governor Slavko Cuvaj of Croatia escaped an assassination attempt by Bosnian law student Lukas Vukica. The bullet instead struck and killed a fellow cabinet minister.
- The body of steward William Frederick Cheverton, a Titanic victim, was recovered by the steamer Ilford, then buried at sea. He was the last Titanic victim to be recovered.
- Universal Pictures was incorporated by Carl Laemmle as the Universal Film Manufacturing Company, bringing together a consortium of seven motion picture companies: Laemmle's Independent/IMP, Powers, Rex, Champion, Centaur, Nestor and New York. According to Bernard Dick, the original name of the company was going to be the Mutual Film Manufacturing Company, but Laemmle changed it after seeing a wagon of the Universal Pipe Fittings company pass beneath his window, inspiring him to drop Mutual from the company name and replacing it with Universal.
- Max von Laue presented the confirmation of the theory of the diffraction of radiation by a three-dimensional lattice (for which he would win the Nobel Prize in 1914), describing the April 21 experiment by Walter Friedrich and Paul Knipping to the Bavarian Academy of Sciences in Munich.
- Abel Kiviat of the United States broke the world record for running the 1,500 meter race, and set the first record recognized by the IAAF, with a time of 3:55.8 at the U.S. Olympic Trials in Cambridge, Massachusetts. The record would stand for five years.
- The Lithgow Small Arms Factory began producing rifles and other armaments to reduce Australia's reliance on defense weapons from the United Kingdom.
- French composer Maurice Ravel's ballet Daphnis et Chloé was first performed by Ballets Russes at the Théâtre du Châtelet in Paris.
- Columbus Fountain, a monument to Christopher Columbus, was unveiled outside Union Station in Washington, D.C. U.S. President William Howard Taft eulogized Columbus as "the greatest mariner in history," before 100,000 visitors, many of them members of the Knights of Columbus.
- The Baltimore County Union weekly newspaper published its final edition in Towson, Maryland.
- Born:
  - Wilhelmina Barns-Graham, Scottish artist, member of the Penwith Society of Arts; in St Andrews, Scotland (d. 2004)
  - Harry Holtzman, American painter, founder of the American Abstract Artists; in New York City, United States (d. 1987)
  - J. Walter Kennedy, American sports executive, former mayor of Stamford (1959 to 1963), second Commissioner of the NBA (from 1963 to 1975) who oversaw the National Basketball Association expand from 9 teams to 22; in Stamford, Connecticut, United States (d. 1977)

== June 9, 1912 (Sunday) ==
- The zemstvo form of local government, already present in most of the provinces of the Russian Empire, was extended to the Cossack provinces of the Don River (Astrakhan, Orenburg and Stavropol).
- The inaugural World Hard Court Championships for amateur tennis wrapped in Paris, with the following results:
  - Otto Froitzheim defeated Oscar Kreuzer in four sets of 6–2, 7–5, 4–6, 7–5 to win the men's singles finals.
  - Marguerite Broquedis defeated Mieken Rieckin the three sets of 6–3, 0–6, 6–4 to win the women's singles finals.
  - Otto Froitzheim and Oscar Kreuzer defeated Harold Kitson and Charles Winslow in four sets of 4–6, 6–2, 6–1, 6–3 to win the men's doubles finals.
  - Max Decugis and Anne de Borman defeated Heinrich Kleinschroth and Mieken Rieck in two sets of 6–4, 7–5 to win the mixed doubles finals.
- The York and North Midland Railway closed the Sculcoates railway station in Kingston upon Hull, England.
- Died: Ion Luca Caragiale, 60, Romanian writer, co-founder of Junimea (b. 1852)

== June 10, 1912 (Monday) ==
- In the town of Villisca, Iowa, Joseph Moore, his wife and four children, and two girls visiting the home were killed by an ax murderer.
- Tsar Nicholas pardoned Kate Malecka on condition that she leave the country forever. Malecka had been sentenced to four years imprisonment for aiding secessionists in Poland, at that time the Polskoe province in the westernmost Russian Empire.
- The Italian Reformist Socialist Party was established by Leonida Bissolati and Ivanoe Bonomi, who were both ousted from the Italian Socialist Party earlier in the year for supporting the Italo-Turkish War.
- The cruiser USS Washington and the battleship USS Rhode Island arrived in Havana, and two more ships were on the way to intervene in the rebellion in Cuba.
- The Austro-Hungarian submarine U-5 towed a kite balloon to determine the best coloration for submarines to avoid detection while underwater. Other than the experimental use of incendiary balloons from SMS Vulcano to bombard Venice in 1849 by its predecessor the Austrian Navy, it is the only operation of an observation balloon by the Austro-Hungarian Navy.
- Born:
  - Mary Lavin, American-Irish writer, author of Tales from Bective Bridge; in Walpole, Massachusetts, United States (d. 1996)
  - Jean Lesage, Canadian politician, Premier of Quebec from 1960 to 1966 and a mover behind the province's "Quiet Revolution"; in Montreal, Canada (d. 1980)
- Died: Anton Aškerc, 56, Slovenian poet, best known for his contributions to literary magazine The Ljubljana Bell (b. 1856)

== June 11, 1912 (Tuesday) ==
- For the first time in the Parliament of the United Kingdom debates over Irish Home Rule movement, the proposal was made to treat northeast Ireland differently from the rest of the island. Member of parliament Thomas Agar-Robartes offered an amendment to exclude the mostly Protestant County Antrim, County Armagh, County Down and County Londonderry from Home Rule.
- Portuguese colonial forces laid siege to a rebel stronghold of 12,000 people in the mountainous region of East Timor, after successfully putting down the rebellion in other parts of the country from April to May, 1912.
- Born:
  - William Baziotes, American painter, promoter of abstract expressionism in the United States; in Pittsburgh, United States (d. 1963)
  - Ruth Montgomery, American journalist, noted promoter of psychic abilities and paranormal phenomena; in Princeton, Indiana, United States (d. 2001)
  - Phạm Hùng, Prime Minister of Vietnam from 1987 to 1988; in Vĩnh Long, French Indochina (now Vietnam) (d. 1988)
  - Rashid bin Saeed Al Maktoum, Emir of Dubai from 1958 to 1990 and Prime Minister of the United Arab Emirates from 1979 to 1990; in Dubai, Trucial States (now the United Arab Emirates) (d. 1990)
- Died: Robert Charles Wickliffe, 38, U.S. Representative from Louisiana from 1909 to 1912, was struck and killed by a train as he walked across a bridge over the Potomac River (b. 1874)

== June 12, 1912 (Wednesday) ==
- J. E. B. Seely became the new British Secretary of State for War.
- Former U.S. President Theodore Roosevelt, running for the Republican Party nomination against incumbent President William Howard Taft, said in a speech that he was in favor of the right of women to vote in national elections.
- The body of Titanic steward James McGrady, recovered by the steamer Algerine, was buried at Fairview Lawn Cemetery in Halifax, Nova Scotia. He was the last Titanic victim to be buried.
- The Big Sisters organization was incorporated, eight years after the Big Brothers had been created.
- The Château Laurier hotel officially opened in Ottawa with Canadian prime minister Wilfrid Laurier in attendance. The opening had been postponed for nearly two months due to death of Grand Trunk Railway president Charles Melville Hays, who perished aboard the Titanic on April 15.
- Allen Parish, Louisiana, was created from part of Calcasieu Parish.
- Born:
  - Eva Crane, English mathematician and biologist, noted for her research into bee behavior; as Ethel Eva Widdowson in London, England (d. 2007)
  - Carl Hovland, American psychologist, developer of social judgment theory and research into the sleeper effect; in Chicago, United States (d. 1961)
  - Nina Mae McKinney, American film actress, known for her film roles in Hallelujah, Sanders of the River and Safe in Hell; as Nannie Mayme McKinney in Lancaster, South Carolina, United States (d. 1967)
- Died: Frédéric Passy, 90, French economist and 1901 recipient of the Nobel Peace Prize for developing the Inter-Parliamentary Union (b. 1822)

== June 13, 1912 (Thursday) ==
- The Rincón de la Vieja Volcano erupted in Costa Rica. On the same day, Alaska's volcano Mount Katmai erupted again, and Mount Redoubt and Mount Iliamna began emitting lava.
- Peace negotiations started between rebellious tribes around the Afghan city of Khost and the Emirate of Afghanistan. Negotiations broke down later in the month and fighting resumed until August.

== June 14, 1912 (Friday) ==
- Dr. Robert Bell won his libel lawsuit against Dr. Henry Howarth Bashford, who criticized his cancer treatment in the British Medical Journal, in the article "Cancer Credulity and Quackery." Dr. Bell brought the testimony of Drs. Paul Ehrlich and August von Wassermann, who testified that cancer could be cured in mice "by injecting into the blood stream a specific compound of selenium and eosin."

== June 15, 1912 (Saturday) ==
- In the absence of opposition to Prime Minister István Tisza's National Party, the Hungarian Army bill was adopted in the House of Magnates, 174 to 33.
- Dr. Duarte Leite became the new Prime Minister of Portugal.
- Dr. F. W. Forbes Ross of the United Kingdom announced that he had developed an anesthetic, consisting of quinine and urea hydrochloride, which could eliminate pain.
- Tennis player Mary Browne defeated Eleonora Sears 6–4, 6–2 in the women singles final of the U.S. National Championships.

== June 16, 1912 (Sunday) ==
- A downpour killed a total of 29 people, including 19 in Merwin, Missouri.
- Twenty people were killed and 14 injured in a railroad crash at Malmslätt, Sweden, when an express train struck a freight train, on the three sleeping cars.
- Born: Enoch Powell MBE, British politician, Minister of Health for the Harold Macmillan administration; as John Enoch Powell in Birmingham, England (d. 1998)
- Died: Thomas Pollock Anshutz, 60, American painter known for works including The Ironworkers' Noontime, later director of the Pennsylvania Academy of the Fine Arts (b. 1851)

== June 17, 1912 (Monday) ==
- The Republic of China's first Prime Minister Tang Shaoyi, announced that he would resign.
- U.S. President William Howard Taft vetoed the Army appropriation bill that had been passed by Congress with cuts of defense spending. It was reported that Secretary of War Henry L. Stimson had threatened to resign if the bill was not vetoed.
- The Supreme Court of Canada held that the Parliament of Canada could not pass a national law governing marriage, and that mixed marriages solemnized by a Protestant clergyman could not be outlawed.
- More than 60 people were killed in Guanajuato, Mexico after floodwaters swept through the town.
- The largest payoff in American horse racing history, according to the American Racing Manual, took place when "Wishing Ring", at 941-1 odds, won a race at the Latonia Race Track near Florence, Kentucky. A $2 bet would have returned $1,885.50 to the bettor.
- Died: Julia Clark, the third American woman to receive a pilot's license, was killed in a plane crash at an airshow in Springfield, Illinois. Crashing into a tall tree while flying in a fog, she was the third woman to die in a plane crash, after Mme. Deniz Moore in July, 1911, and Suzanne Bernard on March 11, both at Étampes, France.

== June 18, 1912 (Tuesday) ==
- The Republican National Convention opened in Chicago, with incumbent U.S. President William Howard Taft having 454 1/2 delegates, former U.S. President Theodore Roosevelt 469 1/2, and 239 claimed by both sides. With a simple majority (513 of 1026) required to win the nomination, the awarding of the contested delegates was critical to the nomination. The Republican National Committee, controlled by Taft's supporters, would resolve 6 in favor of Roosevelt, and the other 233 in favor of Taft.
- The French dirigible Conte and its crew of six ascended to a record height of 9,922 feet. The previous record had been 7,053 feet on December 7, 1911.
- An explosion at the Victor-American Fuel Company mine at Hastings, Colorado, killed twelve coal miners.
- Died: A. W. Verrall, 61, British academic, noted for his unorthodox interpretations of the classics at Trinity College, Cambridge (b. 1851)

== June 19, 1912 (Wednesday) ==
- Lazar Tomanović resigned as Prime Minister of Montenegro, along with his entire cabinet. A new ministry was later formed by General Mitar Martinović.
- U.S. President William Howard Taft signed into law a provision that workers on U.S. government contracts would be limited to an eight-hour workday.
- Near Douai, France, Captain Marcel Dubois and Lt. Albert Peignan, each piloting a different vehicle, were killed in the first fatal mid-air collision between two airplanes, and only the second mid-air airplane collision in history. The first, on September 27, 1911, between Eugene Ely and Harry Atwood, did not seriously injure either pilot.
- Tennessee State University began its first classes, as the State Agricultural and Industrial Normal School, with 147 African American students in its first summer class.
- William D. Coolidge of General Electric laboratories applied for a patent for his process of treating brittle tungsten with heat in order to fashion it into fine wire. U.S. Patent 1,082,933 would be granted in 1913.
- A new training school for military fliers was established at Upavon, England.

== June 20, 1912 (Thursday) ==
- James Kidd Flemming was re-elected as Premier of New Brunswick in provincial elections.
- Lieutenant John Henry Towers survived the U.S. Navy's first fatal airplane accident after Ensign W. L. Billingsly, the pilot, was thrown out of the plane at 1,700 feet. Towers, a passenger, was able to hold onto the plane and survived a crash landing, then set about to design the first seat belt for an airplane.
- The State Duma of the Russian Empire voted in favor of a £50,000,000 program to build the Imperial Russian Navy over five years.
- Messr. Poyer of France, the most successful automobile thief to that time, was caught and arrested in Paris.
- Born:
  - Anthony Buckeridge, English children's writer, known for the Jennings series; in London, England (d. 2004)
  - Markus Fierz, Swiss physicist, developer of the spin–statistics theorem for quantum mechanics; in Basel, Switzerland (d. 2006)
- Died: Voltairine de Cleyre, 45, American activist, early promoter of feminism in the United States, died of meningitis (b. 1866)

== June 21, 1912 (Friday) ==
- Eppa Rixey, who went straight into the major leagues without playing minor league baseball, appeared in his first game as a pitcher for the Philadelphia Phillies. One of the lesser-known enshrinees, Rixey was inducted into National Baseball Hall of Fame and Museum in 1963.
- Born:
  - Kazimierz Leski, Polish engineer, designer of submarines for the Polish Navy during World War II; in Warsaw, Kingdom of Poland (now Poland) (d. 2000)
  - Mary McCarthy, American writer, author of The Company She Keeps and The Oasis, sister to actor Kevin McCarthy; in Seattle, Washington, United States (d. 1989)

== June 22, 1912 (Saturday) ==
- At the Republican Convention, U.S. President William Howard Taft was nominated for a second term by a vote of 561 to 107, after 344 of the delegates refused, out of protest, to participate. The aggrieved delegates were primarily supporters of former U.S. President Theodore Roosevelt, in a convention where the National Committee had resolved most delegate challenges in favor of Taft. Robert M. La Follette got 41 and Albert B. Cummins 17. Roosevelt left the convention and proposed to form a new Progressive Party. The nominating speech for the Ohio native had been made by Ohio U.S. Senator Warren G. Harding.
- Mrs. John Dunville won the Royal Aero Club balloon race.

== June 23, 1912 (Sunday) ==
- The collapse of a dock over the Niagara River killed 39 people at Eagle Park on Grand Island, New York as over 100 people fell into the rushing waters. The dead either drowned or were hurled over the Niagara Falls.
- A general election was held for half of the 40 seats in the Grand and General Council ( Consiglio Grande e Generale) in the tiny republic of San Marino, with 711 candidates vying for the 20 seats, out of which the twenty people with the highest number of votes would qualify.
- Edward, Prince of Wales, eldest son of King George, reached the age of 18.
- Born:
  - Alan Turing, British mathematician, developer of theoretical computer science, and inventor of the Turing machine, the precursor to the modern computer; in Maida Vale, London, England (committed suicide, 1954)
  - Samson Kisekka, Prime Minister of Uganda 1986 to 1991; in Kampala, Protectorate of Uganda (now Uganda) (d. 1999)
  - Ralph Brazelton Peck, Canadian civil engineer, major contributor of soil mechanics; in Winnipeg, Canada (d. 2008)

== June 24, 1912 (Monday) ==
- U.S. President William Howard Taft implemented the first specific regulations governing the proportions and design of the flag of the United States, with the signing of Executive Order 1566. The President accepted the recommendation of a committee, chaired by former U.S. Admiral George Dewey, for the new, 48 star flag, to be arranged in six rows of eight stars each. The most prominent design rejected was that of Wayne Whipple, consisting of a six sided star containing 13 stars, surrounded by a circle of 25 stars (for additional states admitted in the nation's first century) and an outer circle of 10 stars for those admitted after 1876. The 48 star flag would remain the standard until 1959. The ratio of height to width of the flag ever-after would be 1:1.9
- American Federation of Labor President Samuel Gompers was sentenced to one year in prison for contempt of the U.S. Supreme Court.
- Suffragists Emmeline Pankhurst and Emmeline Pethick-Lawrence were released from prison.
- Born:
  - Edward Connellan, Australian aviator, founder of Connellan Airways; in Donald, Victoria, Australia (d. 1983)
  - Brian Johnston, British sports broadcaster, known for work for BBC cricket coverage from 1946 to 1994; in Little Berkhamsted, Hertfordshire, England (d. 1994)
  - Mary Wesley, British writer, author of The Camomile Lawn; as Mary Mynors Farmar in Englefield Green, Surrey, England (d. 2002)
- Died: George White, 76, British Field Marshal, former Commander-in-Chief, India and commander of the garrison during the Siege of Ladysmith during the Second Boer War, recipient of the Victoria Cross. (b. 1835)

== June 25, 1912 (Tuesday) ==
- The Government of India Act received royal assent, which allowed governance of the new Bihar and Orissa Province in British India and the forthcoming province of Assam later that year.
- The Democratic Convention opened in Baltimore.
- A strike involving thousands of waiters and hotel workers in New York City ended with most strikers heading back to work, in part due to strike suppression tactics by police and partial agreements of hotel and restaurant owners to some of the strikers' demands.
- At Alcorta, in the Santa Fe Province of Argentina, a crowd of 2,000 tenant farmers went on strike to protest high rents, inaugurating the first organized farm movement in Argentina.
- The Bornean Baillon's crake (Porzana pusilla mira), a subspecies of the waterbird Baillon's crake, was collected for the first and last time in Borneo, never located again, and is presumed to be extinct.
- Golfer Ted Ray won the 52nd Open Championship, beating defending champion Harry Vardon by four strokes.
- Born:
  - William T. Cahill, American politician, Governor of New Jersey 1970 to 1974; in Philadelphia, United States (d. 1996)
  - Milton Shapp, American politician, Governor of Pennsylvania from 1971 to 1979; as Milton Shapiro, in Merion Station, Pennsylvania, United States (d. 1994)
  - Virginia Lacy Jones, American librarian, promoted racial integration into the American library system; in Cincinnati, Ohio, United States (d. 1984)
- Died: Lawrence Alma-Tadema, 76, Dutch-British artist, known for his academic works including The Roses of Heliogabalus, Spring and The Finding of Moses (b. 1836)

== June 26, 1912 (Wednesday) ==
- The Austrian Chamber of Deputies adopted the Army Bill by a 2/3 majority.
- French racing driver Georges Boillot won the Grand Priz in Dieppe with a time of 13:58:02.6.
- The Ninth Symphony of Gustav Mahler was given its premiere, performed by the Vienna Philharmonic and conducted by the late Mahler's assistant, Bruno Walter. Mahler had completed the symphony in 1911, shortly before his death.
- The Welsh National Museum was opened at Cardiff.

== June 27, 1912 (Thursday) ==
- Evaristo Estenoz, leader of the uprising of Negro rebels in Cuba, was killed in battle. The death of General Estenoz brought an end to the uprising, which resulted in the death of 3,000 black Cubans.
- The Italian Army established its first air force, the Battaglione Aviatori (Airmen's Battalion).
- Born:
  - E. R. Braithwaite, Guyanese-British writer, author of To Sir, With Love; as Eustace Edward Ricardo Braithwaite in Georgetown, British Guyana (now Guyana) (d. 2016)
  - Wilbur Jackett, first Chief Justice of the Federal Court of Canada; in Tompkins, Saskatchewan, Canada (d. 2005)
  - Evgenii Feinberg, Soviet physicist, noted contributor to theoretical physics; in Baku, Russian Empire (now Azerbaijan) (d. 2005)
  - Miné Okubo, American artist, noted for collecting drawing and paintings of children who experienced the Internment of Japanese Americans during World War II; in Riverside, California, United States (d. 2001)
- Died: Frank Furness, 72, American architect, designer of the Fisher Fine Arts Library, the Pennsylvania Academy of the Fine Arts, and First Unitarian Church of Philadelphia (b. 1839)

== June 28, 1912 (Friday) ==
- On the first ballot at the Democratic Party convention, former House Speaker Champ Clark received 440 1/2 votes, New Jersey Governor Woodrow Wilson 324, Judson Harmon 148, Oscar Underwood 117 1/2 and Thomas R. Marshall 31. Thirteen more ballots were taken without any candidate receiving the 2/3rds majority of delegates.
- The resignation of Premier Tang Shaoyi was accepted by President Yuan Shikai.
- The "Korean Conspiracy Trial" began for 123 defendants, mostly Christians, accused of inciting rebellion against the Japanese colonial government. On September 28, 106 would be convicted of treason and sentenced to terms of five years or more, although worldwide criticism of the unfairness of the trial would lead to the release of most of them the following year.
- Born: Carl Friedrich von Weizsäcker, German physicist, member of the Werner Heisenberg nuclear physics research team during World War II; in Kiel, German Empire (now Germany) (d. 2007)

== June 29, 1912 (Saturday) ==
- Champ Clark moved closer to the Democratic nomination for President, when a shift of New York's votes gave him 556 of the 1,094 delegates, more than all of the other candidates combined, but still short of the two-thirds (730) needed to win.
- Thirty-five Arabs were sentenced to death by a French court for participating in November 8 riots in Tunisia.
- China's Foreign Minister Lu Zhengxiang became the new Premier of the Republic of China.
- Austrian pilot Lt. Blaschke of Austria reached a new record altitude of 13,970 feet after takeoff from Vienna.
- Born:
  - Paulina Álvarez, Cuban singer, leading promoter of Danzón music; as Raimunda Paula Peña Álvarez in Cienfuegos, Cuba (d. 1965)
  - Lucie Aubrac, French partisan fighter, member of the French Resistance during World War II, husband to resistance leader Raymond Aubrac; as Lucie Bernard in Mâcon, France (d. 2007)
  - Émile Peynaud, French winemaker, credited as "the forefather of modern oenology"; in Madiran, Hautes-Pyrénées, France (d. 2004)
  - John Toland, American historian, recipient of the Pulitzer Prize for General Nonfiction for The Rising Sun; in La Crosse, Wisconsin, United States (d. 2004)

== June 30, 1912 (Sunday) ==
- The Regina Cyclone, deadliest tornado in Canadian history, killed 28 people after touching down at 4:50 pm in the provincial capital of Saskatchewan.
- On the 30th ballot, New Jersey Governor Woodrow Wilson edged ahead of former House Speaker Champ Clark for the first time, with 460 votes to 455, as the Iowa delegation swung its support to Wilson. On the next ballot, Wilson's lead was 475 1/2 to 446.
- The 10th Tour de France began with 131 cyclists with 10 teams in competition.
- The First Presbyterian Church was dedicated and opened in Redmond, Oregon. It was added to the National Register of Historic Places in 2001.
