= 1912 World Hard Court Championships =

- Date: 1–9 June
- Edition: 1st
- Category: World Championship
- Surface: Clay / outdoor
- Location: Saint-Cloud, Paris, France
- Venue: Stade Français

Champions

Men's singles
- (Germany) Otto Froitzheim

Women's singles
- (France) Marguerite Broquedis

Men's doubles
- (Germany) Otto Froitzheim / (Germany) Oskar Kreuzer

Mixed doubles
- (France) Max Decugis / (Belgium) Anne de Borman
| World Hard Court Championships | · 1913 → |

The 1912 World Hard Court Championships (WHCC) (French: Championnats du Monde de Tennis sur Terre Battue) was the inaugural edition of the World Hard Court Championships tennis tournament, considered as the precursor to the French Open, and was held on the clay courts of the Stade Français at the Parc de Saint-Cloud in Paris from 1 June through 9 June 1912. This tournament was open to all international amateur tennis players and was part of a series of world championships being advanced by the International Lawn Tennis Federation (ILTF), the others being the World Grass Court Championships (Wimbledon) and the World Covered Court Championships held in a variety of countries. The WHCC was open to all nationalities unlike the French Championships which were open only to tennis players who were licensed in France.

The 1912 WHCC consisted of a men's singles, men's doubles, women's singles and mixed doubles event. The women's doubles event was not scheduled. The singles titles were won by Otto Froitzheim and Marguerite Broquedis.

== Finals ==
=== Men's singles ===
(Germany) Otto Froitzheim defeated (Germany) Oscar Kreuzer, 6–2, 7–5, 4–6, 7–5

=== Women's singles ===
(France) Marguerite Broquedis defeated (Germany) Mieken Rieck, 6–3, 0–6, 6–4

=== Men's doubles ===
(Germany) Otto Froitzheim / (Germany) Oscar Kreuzer defeated (South Africa) Harold Kitson / (South Africa) Charles Winslow, 4–6, 6–2, 6–1, 6–3

=== Mixed doubles ===
(France) Max Decugis / (Belgium) Anne de Borman defeated (Germany) Heinrich Kleinschroth / (Germany) Mieken Rieck, 6–4, 7–5
