= 1912 World Hard Court Championships – Men's doubles =

Men's doubles
- 1912 World Hard Court Championships

Final
- Champions: (Germany) Otto Froitzheim (Germany) Oscar Kreuzer
- Runners-up: (South Africa) Harold Kitson (South Africa) Charles Winslow
- Score: 4–6, 6–2, 6–1, 6–3

Events
Singles	men	women
Doubles	men		mixed
World Hard Court Championships	· 1913 →

Otto Froitzheim and Oscar Kreuzer defeated Harold Kitson and Charles Winslow in the final, 4–6, 6–2, 6–1, 6–3 to win the inaugural Men's Doubles tennis title at the World Hard Court Championships.

== Draw ==
=== Key ===
- Q = Qualifier
- WC = Wild card
- LL = Lucky loser
- Alt = Alternate
- SE = Special exempt
- PR = Protected ranking
- ITF = ITF entry
- JE = Junior exempt
- w/o = Walkover
- r = Retired
- d = Defaulted
- SR = Special ranking

=== Draw ===
First round
(Germany) Otto Froitzheim (Germany) Oskar Kreuzer	6	6	6
(France) E Manset (France) RF Quennessen	3	1	1
(United States) Georges Arányi (Hungary) Imre Arányi	1	1	4
(Belgium) Paul de Borman (Belgium) Louis Transenster	6	6	6
(France) Georges Gault (France) Félix Poulin
(United Kingdom) George Caridia (United Kingdom) Arthur Gore	w/o
(Germany) Heinrich Kleinschroth (Germany) Friedrich Rahe	2	6	3	6	8
(France) Albert Canet (France) M Mény	6	2	6	4	6
(France) André Chancerel (France) P Jousselin	5	3	2
(South Africa) Harold Kitson (South Africa) Charles Winslow	7	6	6

Quarterfinals
(Germany) Otto Froitzheim (Germany) Oskar Kreuzer	6	6	6
(Belgium) Paul de Borman (Belgium) Louis Transenster	4	2	1
(France) Georges Gault (France) Félix Poulin	5	6	6	0^{r}
(France) André Gobert (France) William Laurentz	7	4	0	0
(Austria) Ludwig von Salm-Hoogstraeten (France) Jean-Pierre Samazeuilh	w/o
(Germany) Heinrich Kleinschroth (Germany) Friedrich Rahe
(South Africa) Harold Kitson (South Africa) Charles Winslow	6	6	2	2	6
(France) Max Decugis (France) Maurice Germot	2	2	6	6	2

Semifinals
(Germany) Otto Froitzheim (Germany) Oskar Kreuzer	6	6	15
(France) André Gobert (France) William Laurentz	4	2	13
(Germany) Heinrich Kleinschroth (Germany) Friedrich Rahe	4	6	9	5	3
(South Africa) Harold Kitson (South Africa) Charles Winslow	6	3	7	7	6

Final
(Germany) Otto Froitzheim (Germany) Oskar Kreuzer	4	6	6	6
(South Africa) Harold Kitson (South Africa) Charles Winslow	6	2	1	3
