= 1912 World Hard Court Championships – Men's singles =

Men's singles
- 1912 World Hard Court Championships

Final
- Champion: (Germany) Otto Froitzheim
- Runner-up: (Germany) Oskar Kreuzer
- Score: 6–2, 7–5, 4–6, 7–5

Events
Singles	men	women
Doubles	men		mixed
World Hard Court Championships	· 1913 →

Otto Froitzheim defeated Oskar Kreuzer in the final, 6–2, 7–5, 4–6, 7–5 to win the inaugural Men's Singles tennis title at the World Hard Court Championships.

== Draw ==
=== Key ===
- Q = Qualifier
- WC = Wild card
- LL = Lucky loser
- Alt = Alternate
- SE = Special exempt
- PR = Protected ranking
- ITF = ITF entry
- JE = Junior exempt
- w/o = Walkover
- r = Retired
- d = Defaulted
- SR = Special ranking

=== Finals ===
Semifinals
(Germany) Friedrich Rahe	0	2	3
(Germany) Otto Froitzheim	6	6	6
(Germany) Robert Kleinschroth	3	0^{r}
(Germany) Oscar Kreuzer	6	2

Final
(Germany) Otto Froitzheim	6	7	4	6
(Germany) Oscar Kreuzer	2	5	6	4

=== Top half ===
First round
(Germany) Friedrich Rahe	4	6	6	6
(Germany) E Strauss	6	1	1	4
(Austria) Kurt von Wessely
(France) M Mény	w/o
(France) Georges Gault
(France) Jean-Pierre Samazeuilh	w/o
(Germany) Heinrich Kleinschroth
(United Kingdom) George Caridia	w/o
(South Africa) Harold Kitson	6	6	6
(France) A Bonnal	2	1	4
(Germany) Otto Froitzheim	6	7	6	6
(Belgium) Paul de Borman	4	9	3	3
(France) Max Decugis	6	6	6
(Hungary) Imre Arányi	2	1	0
(South Africa) Lionel Tapscott	1	1	6	6	8
(France) Albert Canet	6	6	3	4	6

Second round
(German Empire) F Rahe	6	6	0	6
(Austria) K von Wessely	1	4	6	3
(France) G Gault	2	2	8
(German Empire) H Kleinschroth	6	6	10
(South Africa) H Kitson	1	1	3
(Germany) O Froitzheim	6	6	6
(France) M Decugis	6	6	6
(South Africa) L Tapscott	3	1	0

Quarterfinals
(Germany) F Rahe	6	6	2
(Germany) H Kleinschroth	0	1	0^{r}
(Germany) O Froitzheim	6	6	4	6
(France) Max Decugis	3	4	6	4

Semifinals
(German Empire) F Rahe	0	2	3
(German Empire) O Froitzheim	6	6	6

=== Bottom half ===
First round
(United Kingdom) Arthur Gore	6	6	6
(United States) Georges Arányi	1	1	2
(Germany) Robert Kleinschroth	6	6	6
(France) Maurice Germot	3	1	3
(France) André Gobert
(France) P Renard	w/o
(France) J Arnal
(Austria) Otto von Salm-Hoogstraeten	w/o
(France) William Laurentz	9	6	6
(Austria) Felix Pipes	7	3	3
(South Africa) Charles Winslow	6	6	6
(France) Marcel Cousin	3	2	1
(France) André Chancerel	0	6	6	6
(Belgium) Louis Trasenter	6	2	4	4
(Germany) Oscar Kreuzer	5	6	6	6
(France) Félix Poulin	7	3	2	1

Second round
(United Kingdom) A Gore	2	3	3
(Germany) R Kleinschroth	6	6	6
(France) A Gobert	6	6	6
(France) J Arnal	1	1	0
(France) W Laurentz	0	6	6	6	6
(South Africa) C Winslow	6	4	4	8	8
(France) A Chancerel	3	3	3
(Germany) O Kreuzer	6	6	6

Quarterfinals
(Germany) R Kleinschroth	6	6	6
(France) A Gobert	3	1	4
(South Africa) C Winslow	2	0	6	6	0
(Germany) O Kreuzer	6	6	4	2	6

Semifinals
(Germany) R Kleinschroth	3	0^{r}
(Germany) O Kreuzer	6	2
