= 1912 World Hard Court Championships – Mixed doubles =

Mixed doubles
- 1912 World Hard Court Championships

Final
- Champions: (France) Max Decugis (Belgium) Anne de Borman
- Runners-up: (Germany) Heinrich Kleinschroth (Germany) Mieken Rieck
- Score: 6–4, 7–5

Events
Singles	men	women
Doubles	men		mixed
World Hard Court Championships	· 1913 →

Max Decugis and Anne de Borman defeated Heinrich Kleinschroth and Mieken Rieck in the final, 6–4, 7–5, to win the inaugural mixed doubles tennis title at the World Hard Court Championships.

== Draw ==
=== Key ===
- Q = Qualifier
- WC = Wild card
- LL = Lucky loser
- Alt = Alternate
- ITF = ITF entry
- PR = Protected ranking
- SR = Special ranking
- SE = Special exempt
- JE = Junior exempt
- JR = Junior Accelerator Programme entrant
- CO = College Accelerator Programme entrant
- NG = Next Gen Accelerator Program entrant
- w/o = Walkover
- r = Retired
- d = Defaulted

=== Draw ===
First round
(Austria) Kurt von Wessely (Germany) Frau Röchling	6	4	6
(Belgium) Louis Transenster (France) Marguerite Chaudoir	4	6	4
(France) Albert Canet (France) Marie Conquet
(France) Félix Poulin (Belgium) G Castermans	w/o
(France) André Gobert (France) Marguerite Broquedis
(Austria) Ludwig von Salm-Hoogstraeten (France) Mlle Dagge	w/o

Quarterfinals
(France) Max Decugis (Belgium) Anne de Borman	6	6
(France) William Laurentz (France) Marie Blagé	4	4
(Austria) Kurt von Wessely (Germany) Frau Röchling	5	6	6
(France) Albert Canet (France) Marie Conquet	7	4	0
(France) André Gobert (France) Marguerite Broquedis	6	7
(Austria) Felix Pipes (Austria) Emmy Mattuch	4	5
(Germany) Heinrich Kleinschroth (Germany) Mieken Rieck	6	5	6
(France) Maurice Germot (United Kingdom) Helen Aitchison	4	7	4

Semifinals
(France) Max Decugis (Belgium) Anne de Borman	6	6
(Austria) Kurt von Wessely (Germany) Frau Röchling	4	1
(France) André Gobert (France) M. Broquedis	3	4
(Germany) Heinrich Kleinschroth (Germany) Mieken Rieck	6	6

Final
(France) Max Decugis (Belgium) Anne de Borman	6	7
(Germany) Heinrich Kleinschroth (Germany) Mieken Rieck	4	5
