= 1913 World Hard Court Championships – Men's singles =

Men's singles
- 1913 World Hard Court Championships

Final
- Champion: (New Zealand) Anthony Wilding
- Runner-up: (France) André Gobert
- Score: 6–3, 6–3, 1–6, 6–4

Details
- Draw: 32

Events
| Singles | men | women |
| Doubles | men | | mixed |
| ← 1912 · | World Hard Court Championships | · 1914 → |

The men's singles was one of four events of the 1913 World Hard Court Championships tennis tournament held in Paris, France from 7 June until 15 June 1913. The draw consisted of 32 players. Otto Froitzheim was the title holder but lost in the semifinals to André Gobert.

== Draw ==
=== Key ===
- Q = Qualifier
- WC = Wild card
- LL = Lucky loser
- Alt = Alternate
- ITF = ITF entry
- PR = Protected ranking
- SR = Special ranking
- SE = Special exempt
- JE = Junior exempt
- JR = Junior Accelerator Programme entrant
- CO = College Accelerator Programme entrant
- NG = Next Gen Accelerator Program entrant
- w/o = Walkover
- r = Retired
- d = Defaulted

=== Finals ===
Semifinals
(France) Max Decugis | 0 | 3 | 6 | 6 | 3
(New Zealand) Anthony Wilding | 6 | 6 | 3 | 4 | 6
(France) André Gobert | 6 | 6 | 6
(Germany) Otto Froitzheim | 3 | 3 | 3

Final
(New Zealand) Anthony Wilding | 6 | 6 | 1 | 6
(France) André Gobert | 3 | 3 | 6 | 4

=== Top half ===
First round
(Germany) Robert Kleinschroth | w/o
Malhotra
(Austria) Curt von Wessely | 6 | 6 | 6
(Switzerland) Armand Simon | 1 | 2 | 4
(France) Max Decugis | 6 | 6 | 6
(Belgium) W. Lemaire de Warzeé | 2 | 3 | 4
(France) Georges Gault | 6 | 0 | 6 | 8 | 7
(France) A. Felix Poulin | 1 | 6 | 8 | 6 | 5
(Austria) Fritz Pipes | 6 | 6 | 7 | 0 | 7
(Austria) O. Salm-Hoogstraeten | 2 | 2 | 9 | 6 | 5
(Germany) Friedrich Rahe | 6 | 6 | 6
(Hungary) Jenő von Zsigmondy | 3 | 2 | 2
(New Zealand) Anthony Wilding | 6 | 1
(France) Paul Aymé | 3 | 0^{r}
(France) A. Chancerel | w/o
(Spain) C. Cuevas de Vera

Second round
(Germany) Robert Kleinschroth | 5 | 3 | 8
(Austria) Curt von Wessely | 7 | 6 | 10
(France) Max Decugis | 6 | 6 | 6
(France) Georges Gault | 4 | 0 | 2
(Austria) Fritz Pipes | 1 | 3 | 10 | 1
(Germany) Friedrich Rahe | 6 | 6 | 8 | 6
(New Zealand) Anthony Wilding | 6 | 6 | 6
(France) A. Chancerel | 0 | 1 | 0

Quarterfinals
(Austria) Curt von Wessely | 6 | 9 | 4 | 4 | 1
(France) Max Decugis | 2 | 7 | 6 | 6 | 6
(Germany) Friedrich Rahe | 2 | 6 | 2 | 2
(New Zealand) Anthony Wilding | 6 | 3 | 6 | 6

Semifinals
(France) Max Decugis | 0 | 3 | 6 | 6 | 3
(New Zealand) Anthony Wilding | 6 | 6 | 3 | 4 | 6

=== Bottom half ===
First round
(France) André Gobert | w/o
(France) William Laurentz
(Russia) M. Sumarokov-Elston | 6 | 6 | 6
(France) E. Chelli | 4 | 1 | 4
(United States) Craig Biddle | w/o
(Spain) Luis de Uhagón
(Hungary) Bela von Kehrling | 6 | 6 | 2 | 2 | 6
(Hungary) G.M. Morier | 3 | 3 | 6 | 6 | 1
(Germany) Fritz von Bissing | 3 | 3 | 6 | 6 | 6
(Belgium) Paul de Borman | 6 | 6 | 2 | 2 | 4
(Germany) Heinrich Kleinschroth | 6 | 7 | 0
(Austria) Rolf Kinzel | 2 | 5 | 0^{r}
(France) Maurice Germot | w/o
(Germany) G.K. Logie
(Germany) Otto Froitzheim | 8 | 6 | 2 | 6
(New Zealand) Frank Wilding | 6 | 2 | 6 | 4

Second round
(France) André Gobert | 6 | 6 | 6
(Russia) M. Sumarokov-Elston | 2 | 1 | 3
(United States) Craig Biddle | 2 | 5 | 6 | 3
(Hungary) Bela von Kehrling | 6 | 7 | 2 | 6
(Germany) Fritz von Bissing | 2 | 7 | 3
(Germany) Heinrich Kleinschroth | 6 | 9 | 6
(France) Maurice Germot | 4 | 6 | 3 | 6
(Germany) Otto Froitzheim | 6 | 4 | 6 | 8

Quarterfinals
(France) André Gobert | 6 | 6 | 6
(Hungary) Bela von Kehrling | 1 | 1 | 0
(Germany) Heinrich Kleinschroth | 3 | 2 | 3^{r}
(Germany) Otto Froitzheim | 6 | 6 | 4

Semifinals
(France) André Gobert | 6 | 6 | 6
(Germany) Otto Froitzheim | 3 | 3 | 3
