= Berlin Open =

Defunct tennis tournament
- Event name: West Berlin Open
- Tour: ILTF: men (1913–1972); women (1913–1973); Grand Prix circuit (1973, 1976–79); Independent (1974-75)
- Founded: 1896
- Abolished: 1973 (women); 1983 (men)
- Location: West Berlin, West Germany
- Venue: Lawn-Tennis-Turnier-Club (1896–1906); Rot-Weiss Tennis Club (1907–1983)
- Surface: Clay / outdoor

The Berlin Open officially known as the West Berlin Open (Note: West Berlin was a political enclave which comprised the western part of Berlin from 1948 until 1990, during the Cold War. Although West Berlin was de jure not part of West Germany it was in fact within East Germany, lacked any sovereignty, and it was under military occupation until German reunification in 1990.) was a men's tennis tournament founded in 1896 as a combined event (women included) called the Championships of Berlin until 1914, following World War I the event was known as the Berlin Championships. The event was first played at the Lawn-Tennis-Turnier-Club until 1906. In 1907 it moved to Grunewald, and a new venue the Rot-Weiss Tennis Club. Following World War II the tournament was branded as the West Berlin International Championships. It then ran annually until 1973 as a combined event when the women's tournament was discontinued. The men's event carried on until 1983 when it was last held in West Berlin, West Germany. The event was part of the Grand Prix circuit and was played on outdoor clay courts.

== Finals ==
=== Men's singles ===
Year	Champions	Runners-up	Score
Championships of Berlin
1896	(United Kingdom of Great Britain and Ireland) Herbert Dering	(Germany) Leopold Bach	6–4, 6–0, 6–4.
1897	(United Kingdom of Great Britain and Ireland) Herbert Dering (2)	(Germany) Fritz Grobien	w.o.
1898	(United States) Paul Arnold	(Germany) Adolf Von Gordon	5–7, 6–1, 6–2, 6–3.
1899	(Germany) Adolf Von Gordon	(United States) Paul Arnold	w.o.
1900	(Russia) A. Wladimir Schmitz	(Germany) Adolf Von Gordon	w.o.
1901	(United Kingdom of Great Britain and Ireland) Major Ritchie	(Russia) A. Wladimir Schmitz	w.o.
1902	(United Kingdom of Great Britain and Ireland) Major Ritchie (2)	(Sweden) Gunnar Setterwall	w.o.
1903	(United Kingdom of Great Britain and Ireland) Major Ritchie (3)	(Austria) Curt von Wessely	6–1, 6–1, 6–1.
1904	(Germany) Otto von Müller	(United Kingdom of Great Britain and Ireland) Major Ritchie	w.o.
1905	(Germany) Otto von Müller (2)	(Germany) Ferdinand Bölling	6–4, 6–4, 1–6, 6–4.
1906	Not held		
1907	(Germany) Oscar Kreuzer	(Germany) Otto von Müller	w.o.
1908	(Germany) Oscar Kreuzer (2)	(Austria) Felix Pipes	6–3, 6–0, 7–5.
1909	(Germany) Friedrich Wilhelm Rahe	(Germany) Oscar Kreuzer	w.o.
1910	(Germany) Otto Froitzheim	(Germany) Friedrich Wilhelm Rahe	6–2, 12–10, 6–4.
1911	(Germany) Friedrich Wilhelm Rahe (2)	(Germany) Otto von Müller	w.o.
1912	(Germany) Oscar Kreuzer (3)	(Germany) Otto Froitzheim	3–4, ret.
1913	(Germany) Robert Kleinschroth	(Germany) Oscar Kreuzer	w.o.
1914	(Germany) Otto Froitzheim (2)	(Germany) Robert Kleinschroth	w.o.
1915/1918	Not held (due to World War I)		
Berlin Championships
1919	(Germany) Otto Froitzheim (3)	(Germany) Friedrich Wilhelm Rahe	6–3, 7–5.
1920	(Germany) Oscar Kreuzer (4)	(Germany) Curt Bruno Bergmann	7–5, 6–3, ret.
1921	(Germany) Otto Froitzheim (4)	(Germany) Robert Kleinschroth	6–3, 6–3, 6–2.
1922	(Germany) Otto Froitzheim (5)	(Germany) Friedrich Wilhelm Rahe	6–2, 7–5, 10–8.
1923	(Hungary) Bela Von Kehrling	(Germany) Friedrich Wilhelm Rahe	7–5, 6–3, 9–7.
1924	(Hungary) Bela Von Kehrling (2)	(Germany) Heinz Landmann	6–1, 6–3, 6–1.
1925	(Italy) Umberto De Morpurgo	(Germany) Otto Froitzheim	3–6, 4–6, 9–7, 6–3 retd.
1926	(Hungary) Bela Von Kehrling (3)	(Germany) Willi Hahnemann	6–2, 1–6, 6–1, 6–2.
1927	(Germany) Willi Hahnemann	(Denmark) Axel Petersen	w.o.
1928	(Hungary) Bela Von Kehrling (4)	(Poland) Daniel Prenn	6–3, 7–5, 4–6, 6–2.
1929	(France) Henri Cochet	(Czechoslovakia) Roderich Menzel	9–11, 6–3, 6–1, 6–1.
1930	(United States) Bill Tilden II	(Poland) Daniel Prenn	7–5, 8–6, 1–6, 7–5.
1931	(Czechoslovakia) Roderich Menzel	(Poland) Daniel Prenn	6–4, 6–2, 6–1.
1932	(France) Roderich Menzel (2)	(France) Jacques Brugnon	6–4, 6–3, 6–3.
1933	(Germany) Gottfried von Cramm	(France) Roderich Menzel	2–6, 6–1, 15–13, ret.
1934	(Germany) Gottfried von Cramm (2)	(Italy) Giovanni Palmieri	6–0, 6–1, 7–5.
1935	Not held		
1936	(Germany) Gottfried von Cramm (3)	(Germany) Henner Henkel	6–3, 4–6, 6–4, 3–6, 6–2.
1937	(Czechoslovakia) František Cejnar	(Germany) Gottfried von Cramm	8–6, 0–6, 6–4, 6–4.
1938	(Czechoslovakia) Jaroslav Drobný	(Austria) Hans Redl	6–2, 3–6, 3–6, 6–3, 6–3.
1940	(Germany) Henner Henkel	(Germany) Rolf Göpfert	6–2, 4–6, 5–7, 6–1, 6–2.
1931/1948	Not held (due to World War II) and after		
West Berlin International Championships
1949	(West Germany) Rolf Göpfert	(West Germany) Helmut Göttsche	5–7, 6–4, 6–4.
1950	(Australia) Bill Sidwell	(Austria) Alfred Huber	10–8, 6–4, 6–3.
1951	(United States) Budge Patty	(United States) Dick Savitt	6–1, 6–3, 4–6, 6–3.
1952	(United States) Ham Richardson	(South Africa) Derek Capell	6–3, 6–0, 6–0.
1953	(Sweden) Lennart Bergelin	(Australia) George Worthington	6–3, 6–3, 6–3.
1954	(United States) Gardnar Mulloy	(United States) Budge Patty	7–9, 8–6, 6–4, 3–6, 6–3.
1955	(Egypt) Jaroslav Drobný (2)	(United States) Hugh Stewart	6–1, 6–1, 6–1.
1956	(United States) Hugh Stewart	(Socialist Federal Republic of Yugoslavia) Vladimir Petrović	6–4, 6–0, 6–4.
1957	(Australia) Warren Woodcock	(United States) Budge Patty	5–7, 6–3, 6–2, 6–3.
1958	(Poland) Wladyslaw Skonecki	(Sweden) Sven Davidson	6–4, 6–2, 6–4.
1959	(Australia) Neale Fraser	(Australia) Warren Woodcock	6–4, 4–6, 6–1, 6–0.
1960	(West Germany) Wolfgang Stuck	(West Germany) Christian Kuhnke	9–7, 1–6, 6–1, 6–4.
1961	(Australia) Warren Woodcock (2)	(Italy) Giuseppe Merlo	6–2, 0–6, 6–4, 6–4.
1962	(United States) Frank Froehling III	(West Germany) Ingo Buding	2–6, 4–6, 6–4, 6–4, 6–4.
1963	(West Germany) Christian Kuhnke	(Australia) Fred Stolle	6–3, 2–6, 13–11, 6–1.
1964	(Australia) Roy Emerson	(Australia) Ken Fletcher	6–3, 7–5, 6–3.
1965	(South Africa) Bob Hewitt	(Australia) Ken Fletcher	1–6, 0–6, 8–6, 6–2, 6–3.
1966	(Socialist Federal Republic of Yugoslavia) Niki Pilic	(South Africa) Bob Hewitt	6–2, 12–10, 6–3.
1967	(Australia) Roy Emerson (2)	(Spain) Manuel Santana	6–4, 7–9, 6–4, 3–2 ret.
1968	(Spain) Manuel Santana	(Netherlands) Tom Okker	6–8, 6–4, 6–1, 6–2.
↓ Open Era ↓
West Berlin Open
1969	(South Africa) Raymond Moore	(South Africa) Cliff Drysdale	1–6, 6–1, 7–5, 6–8, 7–5.
1970	(France) Georges Goven	(West Germany) Christian Kuhnke	6–2, 2–6, 6–1, 6–3.
1971	(West Germany) Christian Kuhnke (2)	(Spain) Manuel Santana	6–2, 7–9, 0–6, 7–5, 4–4, ret.
1973	(West Germany) Hans-Jürgen Pohmann	(West Germany) Harald Elschenbroich	6–2, 7–6, 6–3.
1974	(West Germany) Christian Kuhnke (3)	(West Germany) Karl Meiler	6–3, 3–6, 6–3, 6–3.
1976	(Paraguay) Víctor Pecci	(West Germany) Hans-Jürgen Pohmann	6–1, 6–2, 5–7, 6–3.
1977	(Italy) Paolo Bertolucci	(Czechoslovakia) Jiří Hřebec	6–4, 5–7, 4–6, 6–2, 6–4.
1978	(Czechoslovakia) Vladimír Zedník	(West Germany) Harald Elschenbroich	6–4, 7–5, 6–2.
1979	(Australia) Peter McNamara	(France) Patrice Dominguez	6–4, 6–0, 6–7, 6–2.
1981	(West Germany) Werner Zirngibl	(United States) Erick Iskersky	6–3, 7–6 .
1982	(West Germany) Klaus Eberhard	(West Germany) Peter Elter	6–2, 6–2.
1983	(West Germany) Karsten Schulz	(West Germany) Klaus Eberhard	6–4, 6–7, 6–1.

=== Men's doubles ===
Year	Champions	Runners-up	Score
1973	(West Germany) Jürgen Fassbender (West Germany) Hans-Jürgen Pohmann	(Mexico) Raúl Ramírez (Mexico) Joaquín Loyo-Mayo	4–6, 6–4, 6–4
1976	(Chile) Patricio Cornejo (Spain) Antonio Muñoz	(West Germany) Jürgen Fassbender (West Germany) Hans-Jürgen Pohmann	7–5, 6–1
1977	(Chile) Hans Gildemeister (Chile) Belus Prajoux	(Czechoslovakia) Pavel Huťka (Czechoslovakia) Vladimír Zedník	final not played title shared
1978	(West Germany) Jürgen Fassbender (Switzerland) Colin Dowdeswell	(Socialist Federal Republic of Yugoslavia) Željko Franulović (Chile) Hans Gildemeister	6–3, 6–4
1979	(Czechoslovakia) Ivan Lendl (Brazil) Carlos Kirmayr	(Venezuela) Jorge Andrew (Czechoslovakia) Stanislav Birner	6–2, 6–1

=== Women's singles ===
Year	Champions	Runners-up	Score
Championships of Berlin
1896	(Germany) Clara von der Schulenburg	(Germany) Tila Steinmann	6–3, 6–1, 6–2
1897	(Germany) Clara von der Schulenburg (2)	(Germany) Antonie Kusenberg Popp	6–3, ret.
1898	(Germany) Clara von der Schulenburg (3)	(United Kingdom of Great Britain and Ireland) Helen Jackson	6–0, 6–0, 6–2
1899	(Bohemia) Hedwig Rosenbaum	(Germany) Else Steinmann	2–6, 6–2, 10–8, 6–4
1900	(Bohemia) Bertha Kalser	(Germany) Frl Garnet	6–4, 6–2
1901	(Germany) L. von Simson	(Germany) G. Wiebe	6–2, 3–6, 6–1
1902	(United Kingdom of Great Britain and Ireland) Elsie Lane	(Germany) Nelly Herz	walkover
1903	(Germany) Clara von der Schulenburg (4)	(Italy) Nora Cavallar	6–3, 6–1
1904	(Germany) Clara von der Schulenburg (5)	(Germany) Paula Gusserow	6–2, 6–1
1905	(Germany) Clara von der Schulenburg (6)	(Germany) Nelly Schmoller	6–0, 6–3
1906	Not held		
1907	(Germany) Emma Koettgen	(Germany) F. Foth	6–1, 6–1
1908	(Germany) Dagmar von Krohn	(United Kingdom of Great Britain and Ireland) Mary Gray Curtis-Whyte	9–7, 6–4
1909	(Germany) Clara von der Schulenburg (7)	(Germany) Gertrud Mittler	6–1, 6–1
1910	(Germany) Clara von der Schulenburg (8)	(Germany) Hedwig Neresheimer	7–5, 6–4
1911	(Germany) Mieken Rieck	(Germany) Emma Köttgen	8–6, 4–6, 6–2
1912	(Germany) Mieken Rieck (2)	(Germany) Gertrud Mittler	6–1, 6–3
1913	(Germany) Gertrud Mittler	(Germany) T. Popp	6–1, 6–3
1914	(Hungary) Hedwig Neresheimer von Satzger	(Austria) Marie Bertrand Amende	6–8, 6–4, 6–3
1915/1918	Not held (due to World War I)		
Berlin Championships
1919	(Germany) Hete Kaeber	(Germany) Daisy Schultz Uhl	6–4, 7–5
1920	(Germany) Clara von der Schulenburg (9)	(Germany) Hete Kaeber	3–6, 6–2, 6–4
1921	(Germany) Ilse Weihermann Friedleben	(Spain) Lili de Alvarez	6–2, 6–0
1922	(Germany) Ilse Weihermann Friedleben (2)	(Germany) Nelly Neppach	6–2, 5–7, 6–2
1923	(Germany) Nelly Neppach	(Hungary) Ilona Varady	6–2, 6–1
1924	(Germany) Ilse Friedleben (3)	(Germany) Nelly Neppach	6–1, 7–5
1925	(Germany) Ilse Friedleben (4)	(Germany) Nelly Neppach	6–2, 6–0
1926	(Netherlands) Kea Bouman	(Germany) Nelly Neppach	6–0, 7–5
1927	(Germany) Ilse Friedleben (5)	(Germany) Irma Kallmeyer	6–1, 6–2
1928	(United States) Elizabeth Ryan	(Germany) Toni Mettenheimer Schomburgk	6–3 ,6–3
1929	(Germany) Paula von Reznicek	(Germany) Cilly Aussem	7–5, 6–3
1930	(Germany) Cilly Aussem	(Germany) Hilde Krahwinkel	4–6, 8–6, 6–1
1931	(France) Ida Adamoff	(Germany) Ilse Friedleben	3–6, 6–0, 6–4
1932	(Germany) Hilde Krahwinkel	(Poland) Jadwiga Jędrzejowska	6–4, 6–1
1933	(Germany) Hilde Krahwinkel (2)	(Germany) Marie Luise Horn	3–6, 6–4, 6–2
1934	(Germany) Marie-Louise Horn	(United States) Elizabeth Ryan	6–2, 6–2
1935	Not held		
1936	(Denmark) Hilde Krahwinkel Sperling (3)	(Belgium) Nelly Adamson	6–2, 6–0
1937	(Denmark) Hilda Krahwinkel Sperling (4)	(Italy) Anneliese Ullstein	6–0, 6–3
1938	(Germany) Totta Zehden	(United States) Gracyn Wheeler	6–2, 6–8, 6–1
1939/1949	Not held (due to World War II) and after		
West Berlin International Championships
1949	(West Germany) Ruth von Falkenhayn	(Argentina) Mary Terán de Weiss	4–6, 6–4, 8–6
1950	(Australia) Thelma Coyne Long	(West Germany) Inge Pohmann	6–3, 6–3
1951	(Australia) Thelma Coyne Long (2)	(United States) Margaret Osborne duPont	6–4, 6–3
1952	(West Germany) Totta Zehden (2)	(West Germany) Inge Hoffert Buderus	4–6, 6–1, 7–5
1953	(West Germany) Totta Zehden (3)	(West Germany) Inge Reh Vogler	6–2, 6–1
1954	(Italy) Silvana Lazzarino	(Argentina) Elena Lehmann	6–1, 6–4
1955	(Sweden) Birgit Gullbrandsson-Sandén	(Socialist Federal Republic of Yugoslavia) Marica Crnadak	6–3, 6–4
1956	(West Germany) Erika Vollmer	(Bermuda) Heather Nicholls Brewer	4–6, 6–4, 6–2
1957	(Australia) Jenny Staley Hoad	(West Germany) Mary Bevis Hawton	6–1, 7–5
1958	(West Germany) Edda Buding	(Italy) Lucia Bassi	6–2, 6–0
1959	(South Africa) Sandra Reynolds	(Brazil) Maria Bueno	7–5, 6–2
1960	(Mexico) Yola Ramirez	(West Germany) Inge Pohmann	6–4, 6–0
1961	(United Kingdom) Angela Mortimer	(West Germany) Margot Dittmeyer	6–2, 6–1
1962	(Australia) Lesley Turner	(Australia) Jan Lehane	8–6, 3–6, 6–2
1963	(Australia) Margaret Smith	(Australia) Robyn Ebbern	6–2, 7–5
1964	(Australia) Margaret Smith (2)	(West Germany) Helga Schultze	6–2, 6–1
1965	(West Germany) Helga Schultze	(Australia) Jill Blackman	6–4, 6–8, 6–1
1966	(Austria) Sonja Pachta	(West Germany) Almut Sturm	6–2, 8–6
1967	(Rhodesia) Pat Walkden	(West Germany) Helga Schultze	6–2, 1–6, 6–2
1968	(West Germany) Helga Schultze (2)	(Australia) Margaret Smith Court	6–1, 7–5
↓ Open Era ↓
West Berlin Open
1969	(Australia) Karen Krantzcke	(Australia) Lesley Turner Bowrey	6–1, 6–2
1970	(United Kingdom) Virginia Wade	(West Germany) Helga Niessen	10–8, 6–1
1971	(West Germany) Helga Niessen Masthoff	(West Germany) Katja Ebbinghaus	7–5, 1–6, 6–3
1974	(West Germany) Helga Schultze Hoesl (3)	(Argentina) Raquel Giscafré	6–4, 6–0

== See also ==
- European Indoor Championships – men's tournament held in Berlin (1990–1991)
- German Pro Championships – men's professional tournament held in Berlin (1911–1952)
