= 1913 World Hard Court Championships – Women's singles =

Women's singles
- 1913 World Hard Court Championships

Final
- Champion: (German Empire) Mieken Rieck
- Runner-up: (France) Marguerite Broquedis
- Score: 6–4, 3–6, 6–4

Details
- Draw: 16

Events
Singles	men	women
Doubles	men		mixed
← 1912 ·	World Hard Court Championships	· 1914 →

The women's singles was one of four events of the 1913 World Hard Court Championships tennis tournament held in Paris, France from 7 June until 15 June 1913. The draw consisted of 16 players. Marguerite Broquedis was the title holder and she again reached the final to face Mieken Rieck, a repeat of the previous edition, but this time Rieck was the winner 6–4, 3–6, 6–4.

== Draw ==
=== Key ===
- Q = Qualifier
- WC = Wild card
- LL = Lucky loser
- Alt = Alternate
- SE = Special exempt
- PR = Protected ranking
- ITF = ITF entry
- JE = Junior exempt
- w/o = Walkover
- r = Retired
- d = Defaulted
- SR = Special ranking

=== Draw ===
First round
(France) Marguerite Broquedis	6	6
(German Empire) Röchling	1	2
(German Empire) Dora Köring	3	2
(France) Jeanne Matthey	6	6
(France) Suzanne Amblard	6	6
(Hungary) Katalin de Cséry	4	3
(France) Marie Danet	3	7	1
(France) Germaine Golding	6	5	6
(France) Adine Masson	6	6
(Hungary) Ida de Cséry	0	2
(Belgium) Anne de Borman	1	2
(France) Blanche Amblard	6	6
(United States) Elizabeth Ryan	6	6
(France) Magda Aranyi	3	0
(France) Marie Amende	6	2	5
(German Empire) Mieken Rieck	4	6	7

Quarterfinals
(France) Marguerite Broquedis	6	6
(France) Jeanne Matthey	2	2
(France) Suzanne Amblard	6	7
(France) Germaine Golding	1	5
(France) Adine Masson	6	3	3
(France) Blanche Amblard	3	6	6
(United States) Elizabeth Ryan	4	6
(German Empire) Mieken Rieck	6	8

Semifinals
(France) Marguerite Broquedis	6	7
(France) Suzanne Amblard	0	5
(France) Blanche Amblard	2	1
(German Empire) Mieken Rieck	6	6

Final
(France) Marguerite Broquedis	4	6	4
(German Empire) Mieken Rieck	6	3	6
