= 1913 World Hard Court Championships =

- Date: 7–15 June
- Edition: 2nd
- Category: World Championship
- Surface: Clay / outdoor
- Location: Saint-Cloud, Paris, France
- Venue: Stade Français

Champions

Men's singles
- (New Zealand) Anthony Wilding

Women's singles
- (Germany) Mieken Rieck

Men's doubles
- (Germany) Moritz von Bissing (Germany) Heinrich Kleinschroth

Mixed doubles
- (United States) Elizabeth Ryan (France) Max Decugis
← 1912 ·	World Hard Court Championships	· 1914 →

The 1913 World Hard Court Championships (WHCC) (French: Championnats du Monde de Tennis sur Terre Battue) was the second edition of the World Hard Court Championships tennis tournament, considered as the precursor to the French Open, and was held on the clay courts of the Stade Français at the Parc de Saint-Cloud in Paris from 7 June until 15 June 1913. The tournament consisted of a men's singles, men's doubles, women's singles and mixed doubles event. A women's doubles event was not scheduled. All finals were played on Sunday 15 June. Anthony Wilding and Mieken Rieck won the singles finals, which were watched by more than 4,000 spectators. Wilding forfeited the mixed doubles final after having already played eight sets earlier in the day.

== Finals ==
=== Men's singles ===
(New Zealand) Anthony Wilding defeated (France) André Gobert, 6–3, 6–3, 1–6, 6–4

=== Women's singles ===
(Germany) Mieken Rieck defeated (France) Marguerite Broquedis, 6–4, 3–6, 6–4

=== Men's doubles ===
(Germany) Moritz von Bissing / (Germany) Heinrich Kleinschroth defeated (Germany) Otto Froitzheim / (New Zealand) Anthony Wilding, 7–5, 0–6, 6–3, 8–6

=== Mixed doubles ===
(United States) Elizabeth Ryan / (France) Max Decugis defeated (France) Germaine Golding / (New Zealand) Anthony Wilding, walkover
