= 1912 World Hard Court Championships – Women's singles =

Women's singles
- 1912 World Hard Court Championships

Final
- Champion: (France) Marguerite Broquedis
- Runner-up: (German Empire) Mieken Rieck
- Score: 6–3, 0–6, 6–4

Details
- Draw: 14

Events
Singles	men	women
Doubles	men		mixed
- World Hard Court Championships

Marguerite Broquedis defeated Mieken Rieck in the final, 6–3, 0–6, 6–4 to win the inaugural women's singles tennis title at the World Hard Court Championships.

== Draw ==
Key

- Q = Qualifier
- WC = Wild card
- LL = Lucky loser
- Alt = Alternate
- ITF = ITF entry
- PR = Protected ranking
- SR = Special ranking
- SE = Special exempt
- JE = Junior exempt
- JR = Junior Accelerator Programme entrant
- CO = College Accelerator Programme entrant
- NG = Next Gen Accelerator Program entrant
- w/o = Walkover
- r = Retired
- d = Defaulted

=== Draw ===
First round
(France) Marguerite Broquedis	6	6
(Austria) Emmy Mattuch	1	2
(France) Marie Conquet
(Belgium) G Castermans	w/o
(United Kingdom of Great Britain and Ireland) Helen Aitchison	6	6
(France) Marie Blagé	2	1
(Belgium) Anne de Borman	6	6
(German Empire) Frau Röchling	2	3
(France) Daisy Speranza
(France) Mlle Dagge	w/o
(France) Marie Danet	2	4
(German Empire) Mieken Rieck	6	6

Quarterfinals
(France) Marguerite Broquedis	6	6
(France) Marie Conquet	3	2
(United Kingdom of Great Britain and Ireland) Helen Aitchison	6	6
(France) Marguerite Chaudoir	1	0
(France) Jeanne Matthey	6	4	4
(Belgium) Anne de Borman	1	6	6
(France) Daisy Speranza	2	3
(German Empire) Mieken Rieck	6	6

Semifinals
(France) Marguerite Broquedis	6	4	6
(United Kingdom of Great Britain and Ireland) Helen Aitchison	2	6	3
(Belgium) Anne de Borman	3	1
(German Empire) Mieken Rieck	6	6

Final
(France) Marguerite Broquedis	6	0	6
(German Empire) Mieken Rieck	3	6	4
