= Friedrich Wilhelm Rahe =

German tennis player

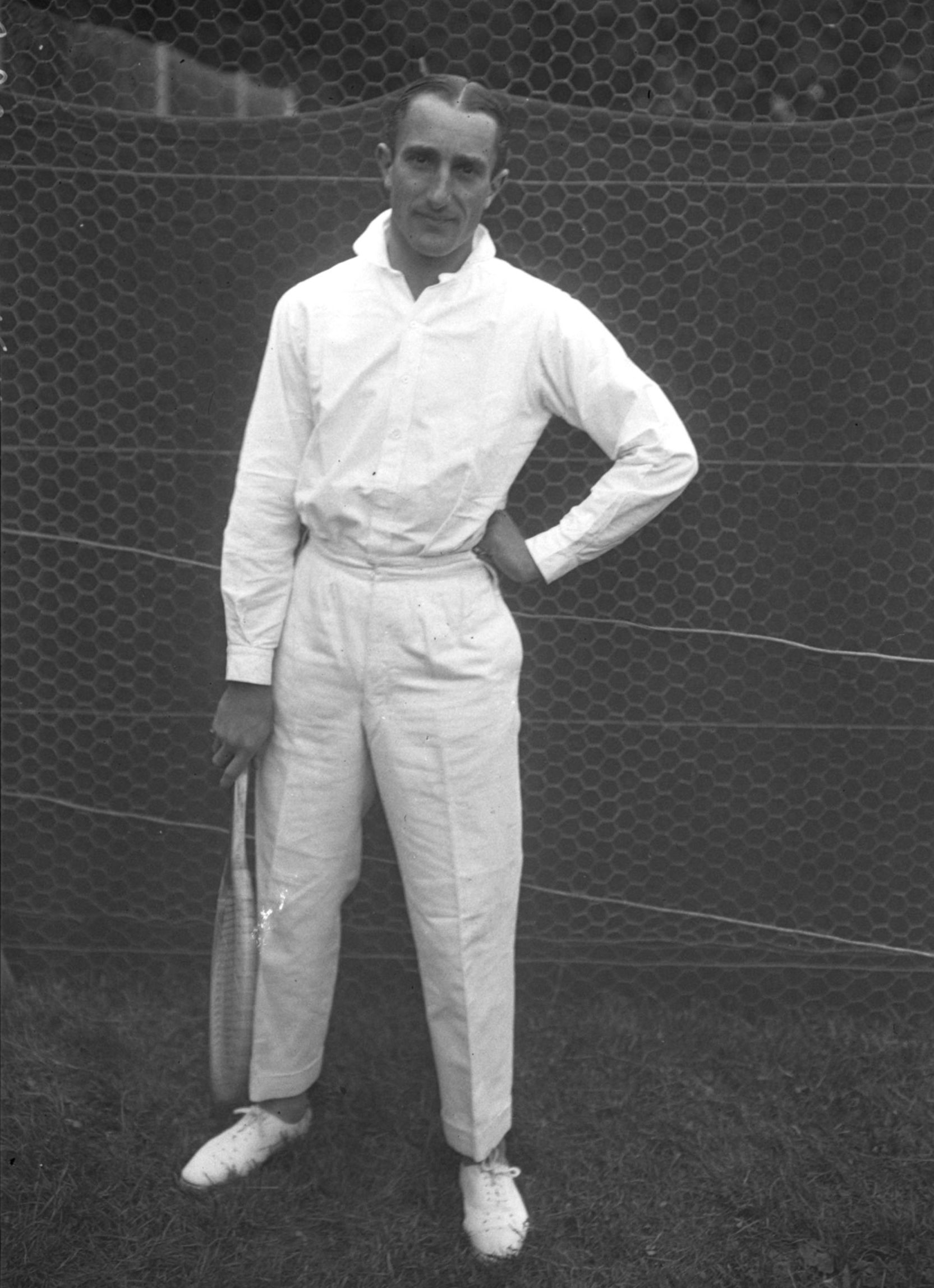
- Country (sports): Germany
- Born: 16 April 1888 Rostock, German Empire
- Died: 18 February 1949 (aged 60) Rostock, Soviet occupation zone in Germany
- Turned pro: 1903 (amateur tour)
- Retired: 1932
- Plays: Right-handed (one-handed backhand)

Singles
- Career titles: 34

Grand Slam singles results
- Wimbledon: SF (1909)

Other tournaments
- WHCC: SF (1912)
- Olympic Games: 1R (1908)

Doubles

Grand Slam doubles results
- Wimbledon: F (1913)

Team competitions
- Davis Cup: SF (1913)

Friedrich Wilhelm "Fieten" Rahe (German pronunciation: [ˈfʀiːdʀɪç ˈvɪlhɛlm ˈʀaːə]; 16 April 1888 – 18 February 1949) was a German tennis and field hockey player.

== Biography ==
Rahe was born at Rostock on 16 April 1888 and grew up in the family house in Kröpeliner Straße 37. His grandfather, the entrepreneur Friedrich Rehmann, had founded a company for wholesale trade of food. Rehmann had three daughters of which the eldest, Emma, had married businessman Eduard Rahe, the parents of Friedrich Wilhelm.

His family's wealth made it possible for Rahe to focus on leisure activities like playing tennis or driving expensive cars. At an age of 15, he took part in the German national tennis championships at nearby Heiligendamm but lost his initial match. In 1906, at the German open championships, he could reach the final but lost to Josiah Ritchie in straights set, winning only 5 games. Although he would later become finalist at the tournament in 1909 and again in 1922, he was never able to win it. However, he won the German national championships twice, in 1908 and 1913.

Rahe competed at the 1908 Summer Olympics in the men's singles tournament and in the men's doubles tournament together with Oscar Kreuzer. He lost in both competitions in the first round. In the Olympic field hockey tournament he was able to score the only German goal to defeat France to finish in fifth place.

In 1913 he was runner-up at Wimbledon, losing the men's doubles final together with Heinrich Kleinschroth in four sets against the defending champions Herbert Roper Barrett and Charles P. Dixon. He reached the semifinals in singles at Wimbledon in 1909 (beating Gordon Lowe before losing to Roper Barrett), and was a quarterfinalist in 1911 and 1912. In 1913, Rahe played in the Davis Cup together with Kleinschroth; the German team reached the semifinals before losing to the US. After the 1913 Wimbledon Championships, Rahe made a trip to South Africa where he played a couple of exhibition matches.

At the beginning of World War I, Rahe joined the German army and was assigned to the Kaiserliches Freiwilliges Automobil-Corps at the headquarters of the crown prince. Lieutenant Rahe was rewarded the Iron Cross 1st Class in early 1915. On 11 August 1915, he married Erna Kribben, sister of tennis player Curt Kribben. Their daughter Gisela was born in 1917.

In 1916 Rahe came to the German delegation at Sofia where he stayed until the end of the war. Afterwards, he opened an art gallery in Berlin. He married for a second time, Liesel Witte, the daughter of a chemicals industrialist. After the International Lawn Tennis Federation had lifted the ban on German players for international tournaments in 1926, Rahe played a match in the 1927 German Davis Cup team.

Rahe's last appearance as a tennis player was at the 1941 German senior championships, where he reached the final but lost to Max Hopfenheit. He died a few years afterwards, in 1949, and was buried in the cemetery Alter Friedhof at Rostock, which was then in the Soviet occupation zone. The family's food company was later nationalized by the ruling Socialist Unity Party.

== Grand Slam finals ==
=== Doubles (1 runner-up) ===
Result	Year	Championship	Surface	Partner	Opponents	Score
Loss	1913	Wimbledon	Grass	(Germany) Heinrich Kleinschroth	(United Kingdom of Great Britain and Ireland) Charles P. Dixon (United Kingdom of Great Britain and Ireland) Herbert Roper Barrett	2–6, 4–6, 6–4, 2–6
