= Félix Poulin =

French tennis player

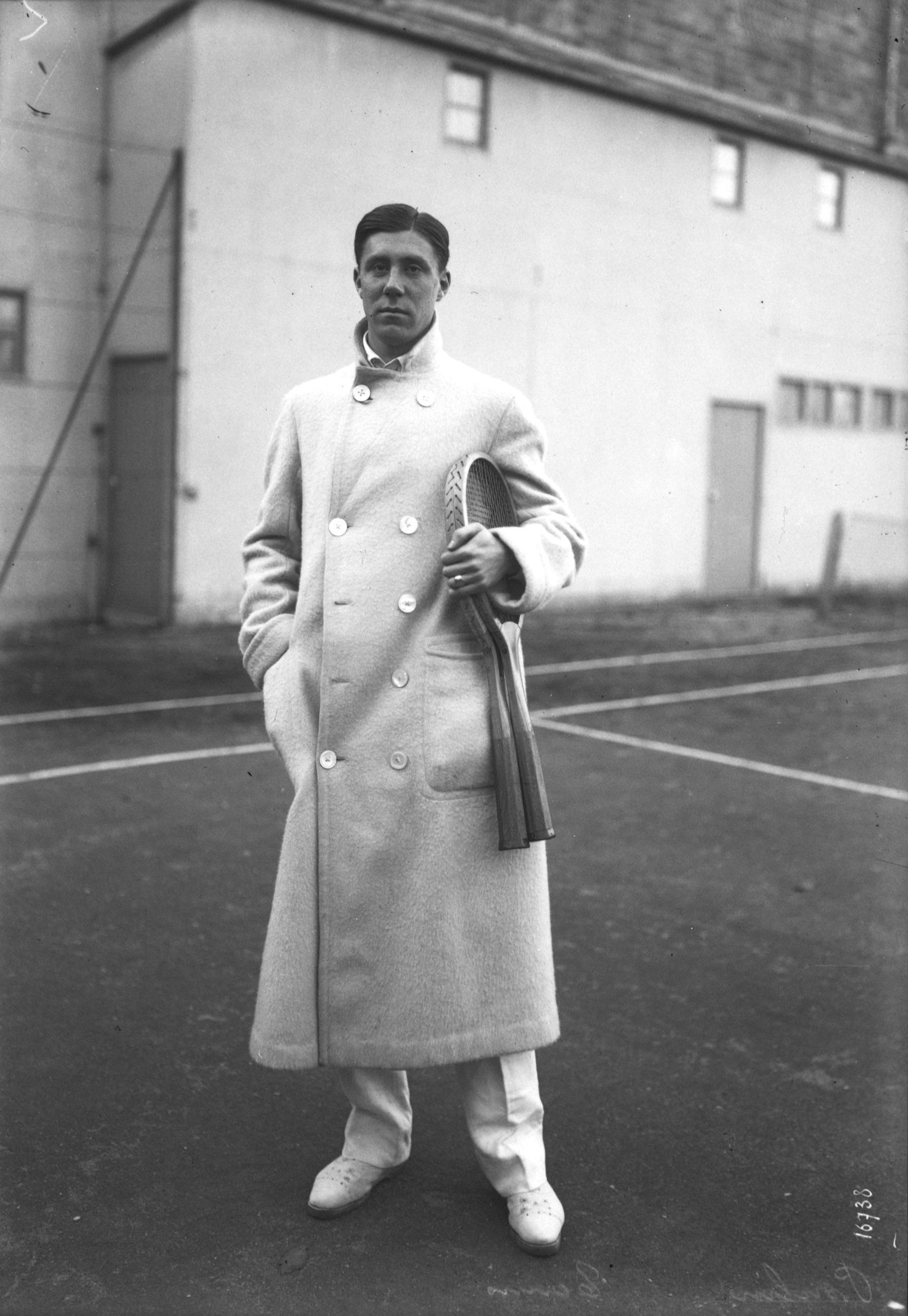
- Country (sports): France

Grand Slam singles results
- French Open: 3R (1926)
- Wimbledon: 2R (1912)

Other tournaments
- WHCC: SF (1914)

A. Félix Poulin (French: [feliks pulɛ̃]) was a French tennis player who was active during the beginning of the 20th century.

== Career ==
He was a finalist at the Monte-Carlo Championships in 1913 in which he was defeated in three straight sets by Anthony Wilding. The match report mentioned "Poulin is a dashing volleyer, but his forehand ground shots are weak. He was brilliant without being safe." In 1913 he won the singles title at the tournament in Aix-Les-Bains, defeating P. Wallet in five sets.

In 1911 he reached the final of the Lyons Covered Courts Championships which he lost to Anthony Wilding in straight sets, winning only one game. He again lost to Wilding in 1914 in the final of the tournament at The Country Club, Nice.

Poulin reached the semifinals of the World Hard Court Championships in 1914.

He participated in singles event of the 1912 Wimbledon Championships, received a bye in the first round, but withdrew from his second round match against C.J. Adams. Poulin also took part in the 1926 French Championships, making the third round in which he lost in five sets to Nicolae Mișu.

During World War I Poulin was attached to the British Army in France.
