= Georges Gault =

French tennis player

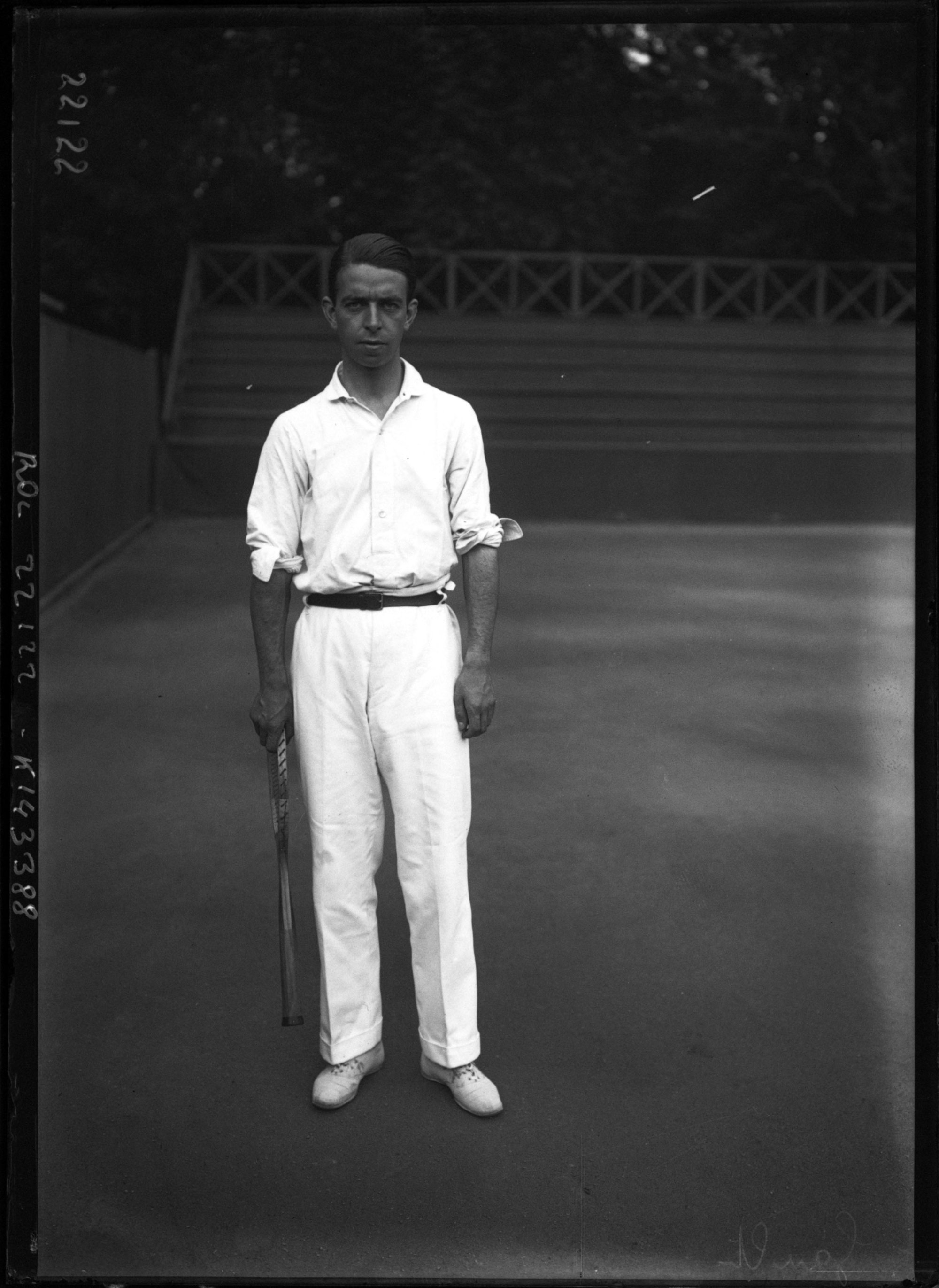
Picture of Georges Gault

Georges Gault was a tennis player competing for France. He finished runner-up to Max Decugis in the singles final of the Amateur French Championships in 1913.

== Grand Slam finals ==
=== Singles: 1 (0-1) ===
Outcome	Year	Championship	Surface	Opponent in the final	Score in the final
Runner-up	1913	French Championships	Clay (red)	(France) Max Decugis	–
