= World Hard Court Championships =

Defunct tennis tournament
- Founded: 1912
- Abolished: 1923
- Editions: 7
- Location: Paris, France (1912–1921, 1923); Brussels, Belgium (1922)
- Surface: Clay / outdoor

World Hard Court Championships (French: Championnats du Monde de Tennis sur Terre Battue) were an annual major tennis tournament sanctioned by the International Lawn Tennis Federation, held from 1912 to 1923. It was principally held in Paris, on clay courts of the Stade Français in the Paris suburb of Saint-Cloud, with one exception when the tournament was held at the Royal Leopold Club in Brussels, Belgium, in 1922.

The name of the event referred to its venues that were surfaced with clay, which at the time was customarily transcribed as "hard court" in English. It was open to all international amateur players from all nationalities, unlike the French Championships, which were open only to tennis players who were members of clubs in France through 1924; because of this the World Hard Court Championships is sometimes considered as the proper precursor to the French Open. The French Championships were also held at a different venue at the time, the Racing Club de France, Paris.

At an annual general meeting held on 16 March 1923 in Paris, the International Lawn Tennis Federation issued the ‘Rules of Tennis’ that were adopted with public effect on 1 January 1924. The United States became an affiliated member of the International Lawn Tennis Federation. The World Championship title was also dropped at this meeting and a new category of Official Championship was created for events in Great Britain, France, USA and Australia – today’s Grand Slam events. The World Hard Court Championships tournament was then disbanded by the International Lawn Tennis Federation.

The World Hard Court Championships was not played in 1924, when Paris hosted the Olympic Games and its tennis tournament, also held on clay courts, took the place of the championship. In 1925 the French Championships opened to international competitors for the first time, with the event held alternately between the Stade Français (1925, 1927), which was the site of the World Hard Court Championships, and the Racing Club de France (1926), which was the site of the previous French Championship. From 1928, the French Championships moved to Stade Roland Garros.

Anthony Wilding was the only male multiple champion in the singles event, winning the title in 1913 and 1914, while Suzanne Lenglen won the women's singles title four times (1914, 1921–23).

== Champions ==
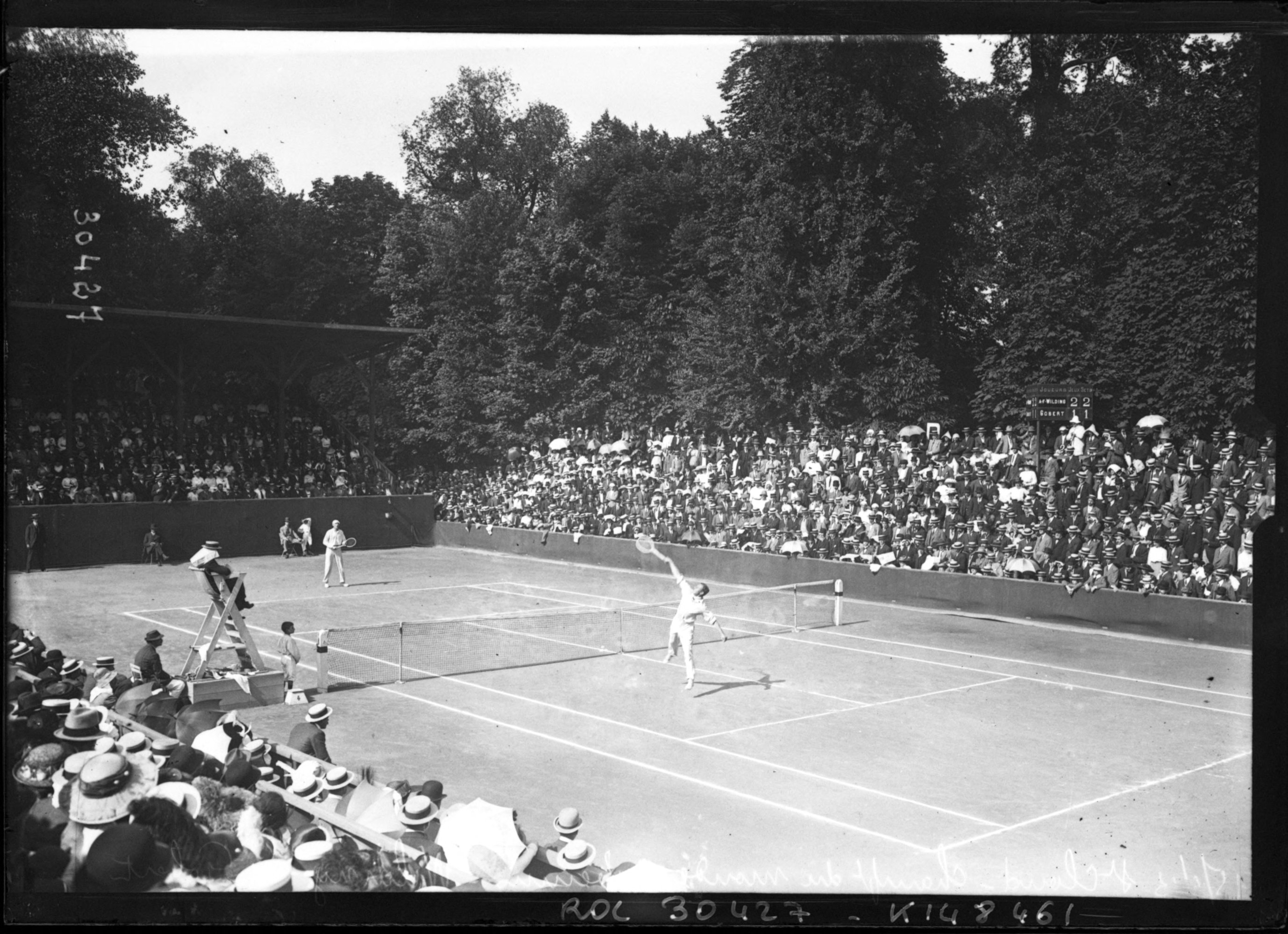
1913 World Hard Court Championships men's final between Anthony Wilding and André Gobert (15 June 1913)

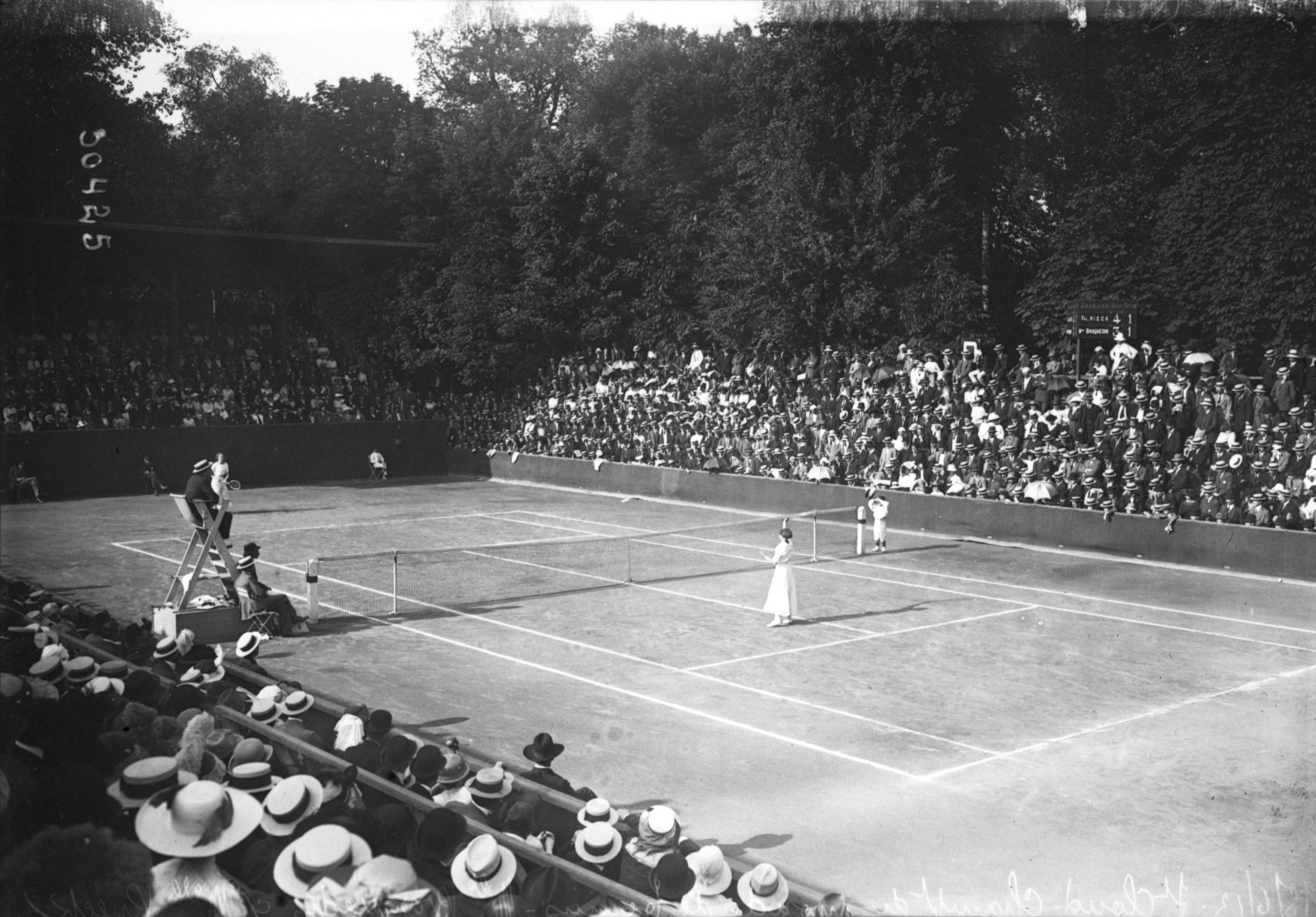
1913 World Hard Court Championships ladies' final between Mieken Rieck and Marguerite Brocquedis (15 June 1913)

=== Men's singles ===
Year	Champion	Runner-up	Score
1912	(Germany) Otto Froitzheim	(Germany) Oscar Kreuzer	6–2, 7–5, 4–6, 7–5
1913	(New Zealand) Anthony Wilding	(France) André Gobert	6–3, 6–3, 1–6, 6–4
1914	(New Zealand) Anthony Wilding	(Austria) Ludwig von Salm-Hoogstraeten	6–0, 6–2, 6–4
1915	No competition (due to World War I)		
1916	No competition (due to World War I)		
1917	No competition (due to World War I)		
1918	No competition (due to World War I)		
1920	(France) William Laurentz	(France) André Gobert	9–7, 6–2, 3–6, 6–2
1921	(United States) Bill Tilden	(Belgium) Jean Washer	6–3, 6–3, 6–3
1922	(France) Henri Cochet	(Spain) Manuel de Gomar	6–0, 2–6, 4–6, 6–1, 6–2
1923	(United States) Bill Johnston	(Belgium) Jean Washer	4–6, 6–2, 6–2, 4–6, 6–3
1924	No competition (Paris Olympics held instead)		

=== Women's singles ===
Year	Champion	Runner-up	Score
1912	(France) Marguerite Broquedis	(Germany) Mieken Rieck	6–3, 0–6, 6–4
1913	(Germany) Mieken Rieck	(France) Marguerite Broquedis	6–4, 3–6, 6–4
1914	(France) Suzanne Lenglen	(France) Germaine Golding	6–2, 6–1
1915	No competition (due to World War I)		
1916	No competition (due to World War I)		
1917	No competition (due to World War I)		
1918	No competition (due to World War I)		
1920	(United Kingdom) Dorothy Holman	(Spain) Francisca Subirana	6–0, 7–5
1921	(France) Suzanne Lenglen	(United States) Molla Mallory	6–2, 6–3
1922	(France) Suzanne Lenglen	(United States) Elizabeth Ryan	6–3, 6–2
1923	(France) Suzanne Lenglen	(United Kingdom) Kitty McKane	6–3, 6–3
1924	No competition (Paris Olympics held instead)		

=== Men's doubles ===
Year	Champion	Runner-up	Score
1912	(Germany) Otto Froitzheim (Germany) Oscar Kreuzer	(South Africa) Harold Kitson (South Africa) Charles Winslow	4–6, 6–2, 6–1, 6–3
1913	(Germany) Moritz von Bissing (Germany) Heinrich Kleinschroth	(Germany) Otto Froitzheim (New Zealand) Anthony Wilding	7–5, 0–6, 6–3, 8–6
1914	(France) Max Decugis (France) Maurice Germot	(United Kingdom) Arthur Gore (United Kingdom) Algernon Kingscote	6–1, 11–9, 6–8, 6–2
1915	No competition (due to World War I)		
1916	No competition (due to World War I)		
1917	No competition (due to World War I)		
1918	No competition (due to World War I)		
1920	(France) André Gobert (France) William Laurentz	(South Africa) Cecil Blackbeard (Romania) Nicolae Mişu	6–4, 6–2, 6–1
1921	(France) André Gobert (France) William Laurentz	(France) Pierre Albarran (France) Alain Gerbault	6–4, 6–2, 6–8, 6–2
1922	(France) Jean Borotra (France) Henri Cochet	(France) Marcel Dupont (Romania) Nicolae Mişu	6–8, 6–1, 6–2, 6–3
1923	(France) Jacques Brugnon (France) Marcel Dupont	(France) Léonce Aslangul (Italy) Uberto de Morpurgo	10–12, 3–6, 6–2, 6–3, 6–4
1924	No competition (Paris Olympics held instead)		

=== Women's doubles ===
Year	Champion	Runner-up	Score
1912	No women's doubles held		
1913	No women's doubles held		
1914	(France) Suzanne Lenglen (United States) Elizabeth Ryan	(France) Blanche Amblard (France) Suzanne Amblard	6–0, 6–0
1915	No competition (due to World War I)		
1916	No competition (due to World War I)		
1917	No competition (due to World War I)		
1918	No competition (due to World War I)		
1920	(United Kingdom) Dorothy Holman (United Kingdom) Phyllis Satterthwaite	(France) Germaine Golding (France) Jeanne Vaussard	6–3, 6–1
1921	(France) Germaine Golding (France) Suzanne Lenglen	(United Kingdom) Dorothy Holman (South Africa) Irene Peacock	6–2, 6–2
1922	(France) Suzanne Lenglen (United States) Elizabeth Ryan	(United Kingdom) Winifred Beamish (United Kingdom) Kitty McKane	6–0, 6–4
1923	(United Kingdom) Winifred Beamish (United Kingdom) Kitty McKane	(France) Germaine Golding (France) Suzanne Lenglen	6–2, 6–3
1924	No competition (Paris Olympics held instead)		

=== Mixed doubles ===
Year	Champion	Runner-up	Score
1912	(France) Max Decugis (Belgium) Anne de Borman	(Germany) Heinrich Kleinschroth (Germany) Mieken Rieck	6–4, 7–5
1913	(France) Max Decugis (United States) Elizabeth Ryan	(New Zealand) Anthony Wilding (France) Germaine Golding	walkover
1914	(France) Max Decugis (United States) Elizabeth Ryan	(Austria) Ludwig von Salm-Hoogstraeten (France) Suzanne Lenglen	6–3, 6–1
1915	No competition (due to World War I)		
1916	No competition (due to World War I)		
1917	No competition (due to World War I)		
1918	No competition (due to World War I)		
1920	(France) William Laurentz (France) Germaine Golding	(France) Max Decugis (France) Suzanne Amblard	walkover
1921	(France) Max Decugis (France) Suzanne Lenglen	(France) William Laurentz (France) Germaine Golding	6–3, 6–2
1922	(France) Henri Cochet (France) Suzanne Lenglen	(United Kingdom) Brian Gilbert (United Kingdom) Geraldine Beamish	6–4, 4–6, 6–0
1923	(France) Henri Cochet (France) Suzanne Lenglen	(United Kingdom) Brian Gilbert (United Kingdom) Kitty McKane	6–2, 10–8
1924	No competition (Paris Olympics held instead)		

== See also ==
- World Covered Court Championships
- Category:National and multi-national tennis tournaments
