= Marguerite Broquedis =

French tennis player (1893–1983)

- Broquedis in 1912
- Full name: Marguerite Marie Broquedis-Billout-Bordes
- Country (sports): France
- Born: 17 April 1893; Pau, France
- Died: 23 April 1983 (aged 90); Orléans, France

Singles
- Career record: 97–37
- Career titles: 24
- Highest ranking: No. 9 (1925, A. Wallis Myers)

Grand Slam singles results
- French Open: QF (1925, 1927)
- Wimbledon: SF (1925)
- WHCC: W (1912)

Doubles

Grand Slam doubles results
- French Open: SF (1925)
- Wimbledon: QF (1927)

Mixed doubles

Grand Slam mixed doubles results
- French Open: W (1927)
- Wimbledon: F (1914)
Medal record
Olympic Games – Tennis
Gold medal – first place	1912 Stockholm	Singles
Bronze medal – third place	1912 Stockholm	Mixed doubles

Marguerite Marie Broquedis (French pronunciation: [maʁɡ(ə)ʁit bʁɔk(ə)di]; married names Billout-Bordes; 17 April 1893 – 23 April 1983) was a French tennis player. In major tournaments she won the singles title at the 1912 World Hard Court Championships, and the mixed doubles at the 1927 French Championships.

== Biography ==
Broquedis was born on 17 April 1893 in Pau, Pyrénées-Atlantiques. She moved with her family to Paris around the turn of the century and started playing tennis on two dusty courts that were part of the Galerie des machines. Later she joined the Racing Club de France.

Broquedis competed at the 1912 Olympics at Stockholm, where she won the gold medal in outdoor singles by beating German Dora Köring in a three-sets final. She won the bronze medal partnering Albert Canet in mixed doubles. In 1913 and 1914, she won the French championships, beating 15-year-old Suzanne Lenglen in the 1914 final. Broquedis, nicknamed "the goddess", is also known for being the only player ever to beat Lenglen in a fully played singles final. She also took part in the 1924 Olympics at Paris but could not win any medal there.

Her career singles highlights include winning the French Covered Court Championships on six occasions (1910, 1912–13, 1922, 1925, and 1927). In addition, she also won the Coupe de la Villa Primrose seven times (1907, 1911, 1923, 1925, and 1927–29), the Cabourg International three times (1920–22) and the Tournoi International d'Aix-Les-Bains two times (1924, 1927).

From 1925 to 1927, Broquedis had another successful time in her tennis career, reaching the singles semifinals at Wimbledon in 1925 and the quarterfinals twice at the (now fully international) French championships in 1925 and 1927. Moreover, she won the mixed doubles title partnering Jean Borotra at Paris in 1927. She was ranked world No. 9 by A. Wallis Myers in 1925.

Broquedis died in Orléans in 1983, aged 90.

== Major finals ==
=== Grand Slam finals ===
==== Mixed doubles (1 title, 1 runner-up) ====
Result	Year	Championship	Surface	Partner	Opponents	Score
Loss	1914	Wimbledon	Grass	(Australia) Anthony Wilding	(United Kingdom) Ethel Thomson Larcombe (United Kingdom) James Cecil Parke	6–4, 4–6, 2–6
Win	1927	French Championships	Clay	(France) Jean Borotra	(Spain) Lilí Álvarez (United States) Bill Tilden	6–4, 2–6, 6–2

=== World Hard Court Championships ===
==== Singles (1 title, 1 runner-up) ====
Result	Year	Championship	Surface	Opponent	Score
Win	1912	World Hard Court Championships	Clay	(German Empire) Mieken Rieck	6–3, 0–6, 6–4
Loss	1913	World Hard Court Championships	Clay	(German Empire) Mieken Rieck	4–6, 6–3, 4–6
