= Mieken Rieck =

German tennis player

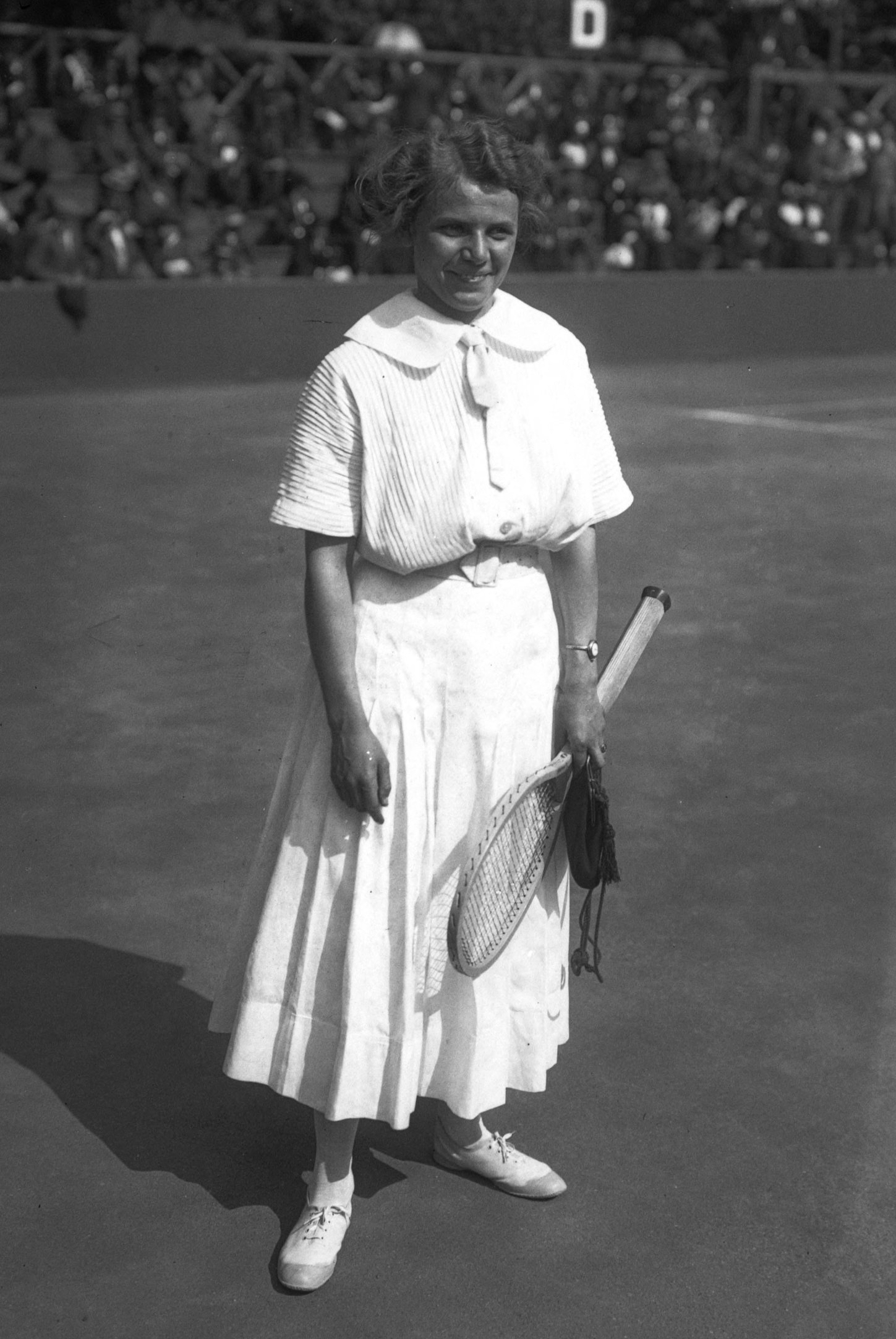
- Full name: Magdalene Rieck Galvao
- Country (sports): Germany
- Born: 24 April 1892 Hamburg, German Empire
- Died: 27 December 1977 (aged 85) Hamburg, West Germany

Singles

Grand Slam singles results
- Wimbledon: 3R (1913)

Other tournaments
- WHCC: W (1913)

Doubles

Grand Slam doubles results
- Wimbledon: 2R (1913)

Grand Slam mixed doubles results
- Wimbledon: 3R (1921)
- WHCC: F (1912)

Magdalene "Mieken" Rieck (26 April 1892 – 27 December 1977), married name Magdalene Galvao, was a German tennis player active in the early 20th century. She later became a sports administrator.

== Biography ==
Rieck, who was a member of Harvestehuder THC in 1910 and 1911, won the singles title at the German Championships in Hamburg. Her most significant result was winning the singles title at the World Hard Court Championships in 1913 in Paris, after reaching the final of this clay court tournament in 1912. In 1911 and 1913, Rieck participated in the Wimbledon Championships and reached the third round (last 16) in 1913 which she lost to Phyllis Satterthwaite. She entered the tennis event at the 1912 Olympic Games in Stockholm but did not play her first round match against Norwegian Valborg Bjurstedt.

Rieck, also an enthusiastic field hockey player, was administrator of the Deutschen Hockeybundes from 1929 until 1945 and from 1930 until 1945 president of the women's hockey at the International Hockey Federation. She died in December 1977, aged 85, in Hamburg.

== World Championships finals ==
=== Singles (1 title, 1 runner-up) ===
Result	Year	Championship	Surface	Opponent	Score
Loss	1912	World Hard Court Championships	Clay	(France) Marguerite Broquedis	3–6, 6–0, 4–6
Win	1913	World Hard Court Championships	Clay	(France) Marguerite Broquedis	6–4, 3–6, 6–4

=== Mixed doubles: (1 runner-up) ===
Result	Year	Championship	Surface	Partner	Opponents	Score
Loss	1912	World Hard Court Championships	Clay	(Germany) Heinrich Kleinschroth	(France) Max Decugis (Belgium) Anne de Borman	4–6, 5–7
