= Anne de Borman =

Belgian tennis player

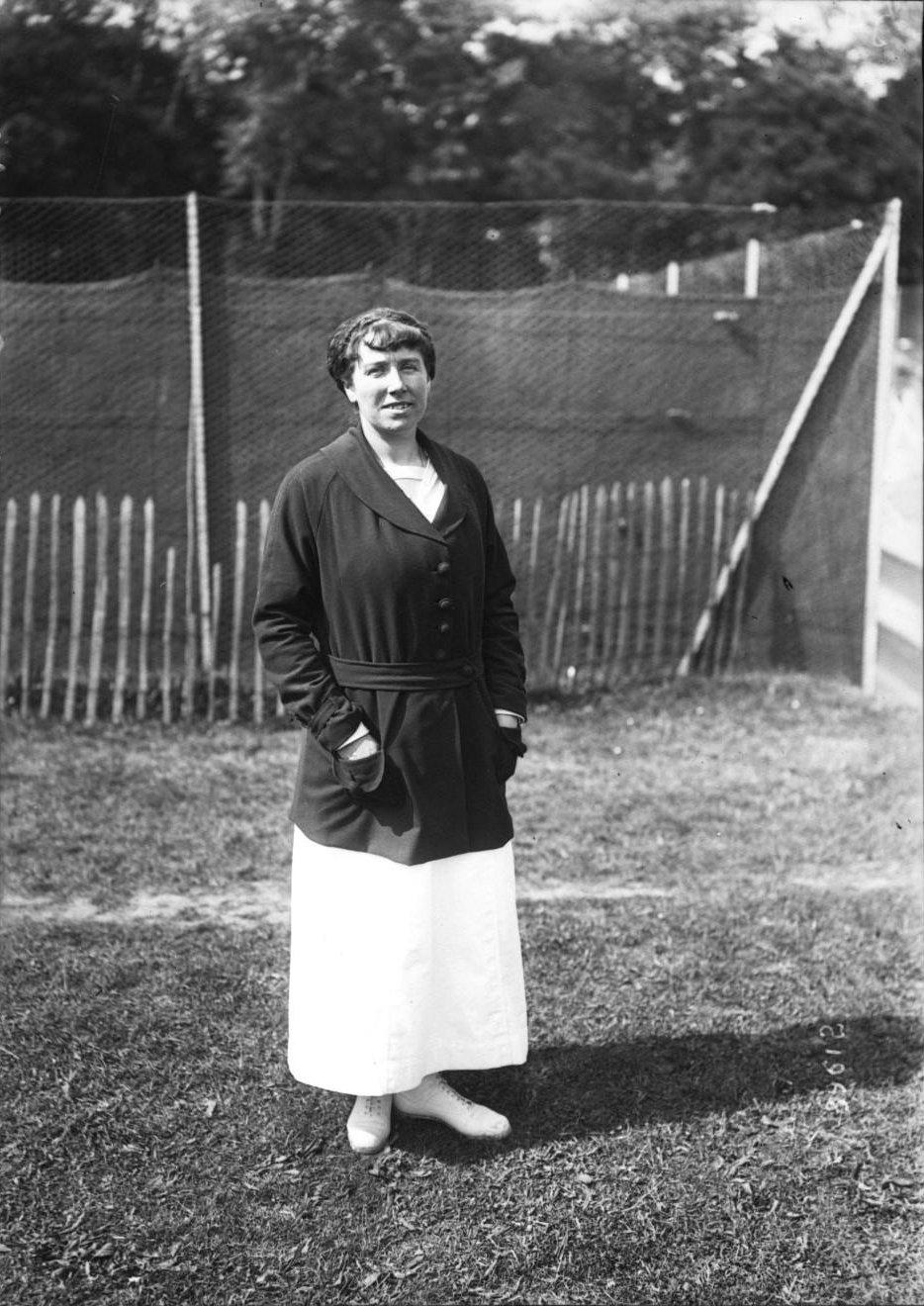
- Full name: Christine Anne de Borman
- Country (sports): Belgium
- Born: 3 February 1881; Saint-Josse-ten-Noode, Belgium
- Died: 30 September 1962 (aged 81); Brussels, Belgium

Singles

Grand Slam singles results
- Wimbledon: 1R (1921)

Other tournaments
- Olympic Games: QF (1920)

Doubles

Grand Slam doubles results
- Wimbledon: QF (1921)
- Olympic Games: QF (1920)

Grand Slam mixed doubles results
- Wimbledon: 1R (1921)
- WHCC: W (1912)
- Olympic Games: 2R (1920, 1924)

Anne de Borman (3 February 1881 – 30 September 1962), née Christine Anne de Selliers de Moranville, was a Belgian female tennis player who represented Belgium at the Olympic Games. She competed in the singles event at the 1920 and 1924 Summer Olympics. In 1920 she had a bye in the first round and was defeated by Kitty McKane in the second round while in 1924 she lost in the first round to Sigrid Fick. With compatriot Lucienne Tschaggeny she had a bye in the first round of the 1920 women's doubles event and lost in the quarterfinal to Winifred Beamish and Edith Holman. At the next Olympics in 1924 she teamed up with Marie Storms and lost in the second round to Phyllis Covell and Kitty McKane after a bye in the first. In the mixed she partnered Jean Washer in 1920 but lost in the second round after a bye in the first and in 1924 she won her first round match with Stéphane Halot and were defeated in the second.

De Borman competed in all three events (singles, doubles, mixed) at the 1921 Wimbledon Championships. In the singles event she lost in straight sets in the first round to E. F. Rose. In the doubles she reached the quarterfinal round with H.B. Weston. With her husband Paul de Borman she lost in the first round of the mixed doubles event.

In 1912 she won the mixed doubles title at the World Hard Court Championships, played at the Stade Français in Paris. With her partner Max Decugis she defeated the German pair Mieken Rieck and Heinrich Kleinschroth in the final in straight sets.

In 1907 she married Paul de Borman, a tennis player who was active during the early part of the 20th century and is regarded as a pioneer of Belgian tennis. From 1946 to 1947 he was president of the International Tennis Federation. Their children Geneviève (b. 1908), Léopold (b. 1909) and Myriam (b. 1915) she won Belgian Championships four times 1911 to 1913 and in 1920.

== World Championships finals ==
=== Mixed doubles: (1 title) ===
Result	Year	Championship	Surface	Partner	Opponents	Score
Win	1912	World Hard Court Championships	Clay	(France) Max Decugis	(Germany) Heinrich Kleinschroth (Germany) Mieken Rieck	6–4, 7–5
