= Oscar Kreuzer =

German tennis player and rugby union footballer (1887–1968)

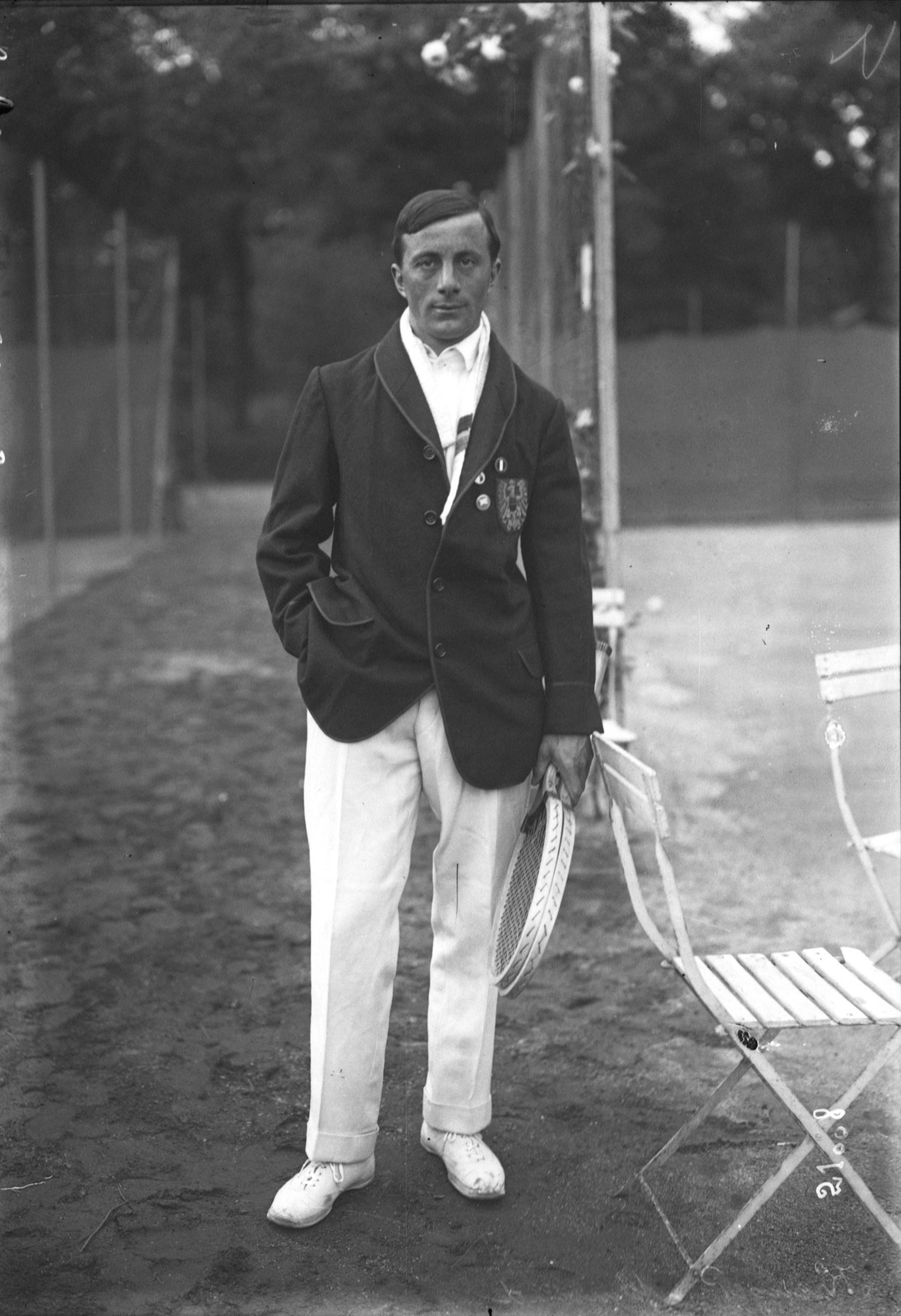
- Country (sports): Germany
- Born: 14 June 1887 Frankfurt am Main, German Empire
- Died: 1 May 1968 (aged 80) Wiesbaden, West Germany
- Plays: Left-handed (one-handed backhand)

Grand Slam singles results
- Wimbledon: SF (1913)

Other tournaments
- WHCC: F (1912)

Grand Slam doubles results
- Wimbledon: 3R (1913)

Other doubles tournaments
- WHCC: W (1912)
- Olympic Games: 1R (1908)

Grand Slam mixed doubles results
- Wimbledon: 2R (1913, 1927)

Team competitions
- Davis Cup: SF (1913, 1914)
Medal record
Representing (Germany)
Tennis
Olympic Games
Bronze medal – third place	1912 Stockholm	Singles

Oscar Kreuzer (German pronunciation: [ˈɔskaʁ ˈkʁɔʏtsɐ]; 14 June 1887 – 1 May 1968) was a male tennis and rugby player from Germany.

== Biography ==
Kreuzer was born at Frankfurt am Main on 14 June 1887.

He played at the 1908 Summer Olympics and at the 1912 Summer Olympics in Stockholm, Sweden where he won a bronze medal in the men's singles tournament. In 1912, he also reached the final at the World Hard Court Championships at Paris which he lost to his compatriot Otto Froitzheim. At Wimbledon, he reached his best result in 1913 where he advanced to the semifinals before being stopped by Stanley Doust.

Besides tennis, Kreuzer also excelled at rugby. He won the German championships with his club SC 1880 Frankfurt in 1910, and played several caps for Germany.

At the end of July 1914, he and Otto Froitzheim played the semifinal of the International Lawn Tennis Challenge at Pittsburgh against Australasia. When World War I broke out, the president of the local tennis club kept this from Froitzheim and Kreuzer as he didn't want to disrupt the match. The German team lost 0–5. On their way back to Germany, their Italian steamboat America was halted off Gibraltar by a British warship and they were placed in a prison in Gibraltar for several months before being sent to detention camps in England. While Kreuzer stayed at a camp near Leeds, officer Froitzheim was kept at Donnington Hall until the end of the war in 1918.

In 1920 he won the International German Championships at the Rothenbaum club in Hamburg, defeating Louis Maria Heyden in the final in three straight sets.

After he retired from playing tennis tournaments, Kreuzer settled at Wiesbaden, near his friend Froitzheim. He died there on 1 May 1968.

== World Championships finals ==
=== Singles (1 runner-up) ===
Result	Year	Championship	Surface	Opponent	Score
Loss	1912	World Hard Court Championships	Clay	(Germany) Otto Froitzheim	2–6, 5–7, 6–4, 5–7

=== Doubles (1 title) ===
Result	Year	Championship	Surface	Partner	Opponents	Score
Win	1912	World Hard Court Championships	Clay	(Germany) Otto Froitzheim	(South Africa) Harold Kitson (South Africa) Charles Winslow	4–6, 6–2, 6–1, 6–3
