= Heinrich Kleinschroth =

German tennis player (1890–1979)

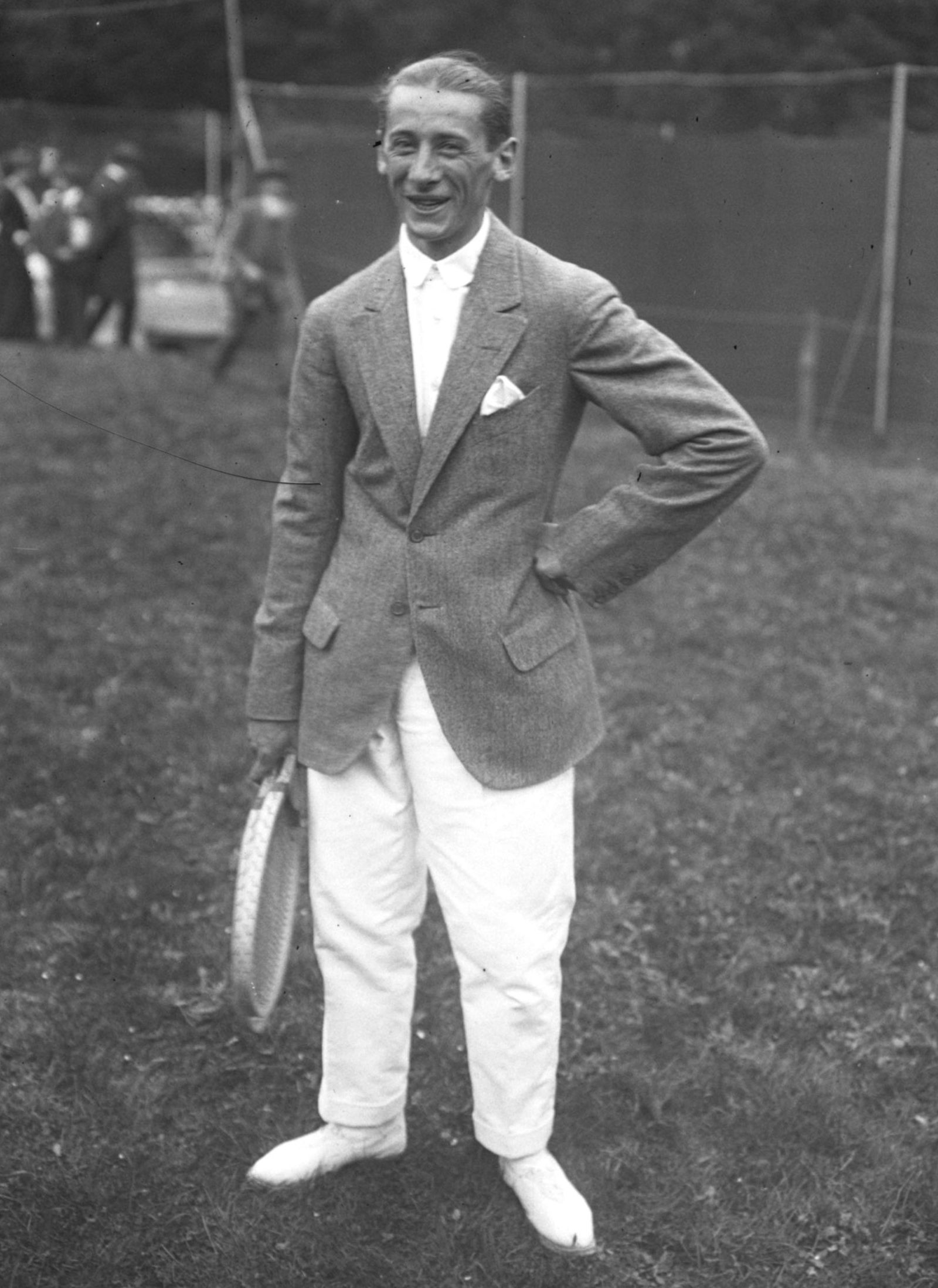
- Country (sports): Germany
- Born: 15 March 1890 Kitzingen, German Empire
- Died: 10 January 1979 (aged 88) Munich, West Germany
- Turned pro: 1906 (amateur tour)
- Retired: 1938

Singles
- Highest ranking: No. 9 (1914, A. Wallis Myers)

Grand Slam singles results
- French Open: 4R (1930)
- Wimbledon: 3R (1927, 1932)
- US Open: Q1 (1912)
- US Open Senior: F (1937)

Other tournaments
- WHCC: QF (1912, 1913)
- WCCC: QF (1913)

Doubles

Grand Slam doubles results
- Australian Open: 1R (1938)
- French Open: QF (1929)
- Wimbledon: F (1913)

Other doubles tournaments
- WHCC: W (1913)
- WCCC: F (1910)

Mixed doubles
- WHCC: F (1912)

Team competitions
- Davis Cup: F (1929)

Heinrich Kleinschroth (German pronunciation: [ˈhaɪnʁɪç ˈklaɪnʃʁoːt]; 15 March 1890 – 10 January 1979) was an amateur German tennis player who found success in the early 20th century, mainly in doubles competitions.

== Tennis career ==
At the age of 20, he became the Catalan champion by winning both the singles and doubles with his brother in the Barcelona tournament (He repeated his doubles feat again in 1914). The same year he won the Homburg Cup by defeating the three-times defending champion and Germany's top player Otto Froitzheim. He also became Austrian Champion after claiming the Austrian International Championships in Vienna. In September 1910 he won the singles title at the Montreux Tournament after defeating R. Norris Williams in the final in five sets.

In 1911, he won several French Riviera mixed doubles titles pairing Hedwig Neresheimer. He also retained his Austrian title. In the South of France Championships he and Max Decugis lost the doubles final to Tony Wilding and Josiah Ritchie. In the Menton tournament he was defeated again by the former team in the doubles championships match partnering his brother Robert.

In 1913, he won the South of France Championships doubles (also the mixed doubles) and the Monte Carlo Cup alongside Friedrich Wilhelm Rahe who later became his partner for the 1913 Wimbledon Championships doubles final which they subsequently lost.

In major tournaments, Kleinschroth reached the quarter-finals of the World Covered Court Championships in 1913 and the quarter-finals of the World Hard Court Championships in both 1912 and 1913. He was on the Germany Davis Cup team several times, including Germany's World Group semi-final and Inter-Zonal final showings in 1913 and 1929 respectively.

A. Wallis Myers of The Daily Telegraph ranked Kleinschroth as world No. 9 in 1914.

During World War I he fought in the Western Front and fell into captivity in France.

He was the manager/coach of Gottfried von Cramm and Henner Henkel and the Germany Davis Cup team in the 1930s.

Heinrich's brother, Robert Kleinschroth, also competed on the amateur tour, reaching the semi-finals of the World Hard Court Championships in 1912.

He was a Juris Doctor, a degree he obtained at the Ludwig-Maximilians-Universität München and used that title later on and registered as such for tournaments.

In his post-retirement years in the 60s he worked for the International Tennis Federation management committee and also was a part of a subcommittee dedicated to work on the possible merging of amateur and professional tennis scene, a project that came to life just a year after.

== Grand Slam finals ==
=== Doubles (1 runner-up) ===
Result	Year	Championship	Surface	Partner	Opponents	Score
Loss	1913	Wimbledon	Grass	(Germany) Friedrich Wilhelm Rahe	(United Kingdom of Great Britain and Ireland) Charles P. Dixon (United Kingdom of Great Britain and Ireland) Herbert Roper Barrett	2–6, 4–6, 6–4, 2–6

== World Championships finals ==
=== Doubles: (1 title, 1 runner-up) ===
Result	Year	Championship	Surface	Partner	Opponents	Score
Win	1913	World Hard Court Championships	Clay	(Germany) Moritz von Bissing	(Germany) Otto Froitzheim (New Zealand) Anthony Wilding	7–5, 0–6, 6–3, 8–6
Loss	1913	World Covered Court Championships	Wood	(Germany) Curt Bergmann	(France) Max Decugis (France) Maurice Germot	5–7, 6–2, 9–7, 3–6, 1–6

=== Mixed doubles: (1 runner-up) ===
Result	Year	Championship	Surface	Partner	Opponents	Score
Loss	1912	World Hard Court Championships	Clay	(Germany) Mieken Rieck	(France) Max Decugis (Belgium) Anne de Borman	4–6, 5–7

== See also ==
- 1930 in tennis
- 1931 in tennis
