= Otto Froitzheim =

German tennis player

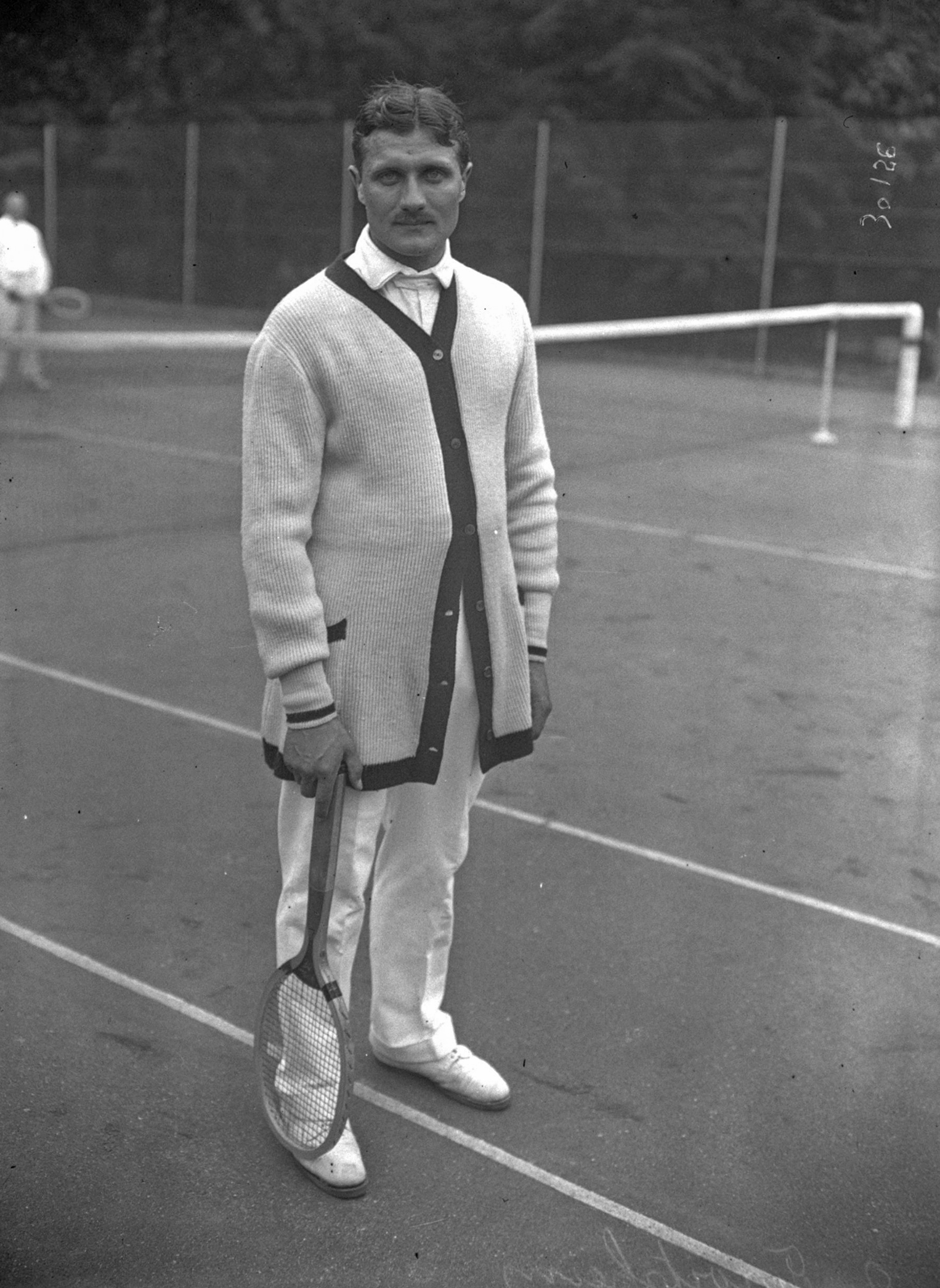
- Froitzheim in 1913
- Country (sports): Germany
- Born: 24 April 1884 Strasbourg, German Empire
- Died: 27 October 1962 (aged 78) Wiesbaden, West Germany
- Plays: Right-handed (one-handed backhand)

Singles
- Career record: 212–53 (80%)
- Career titles: 35
- Highest ranking: No. 4 (1914, A. Wallis Myers)

Grand Slam singles results
- French Open: QF (1927)
- Wimbledon: F (1914^{(AC)})

Other tournaments
- WHCC: W (1912)

Grand Slam doubles results
- French Open: 3R (1930)
- Wimbledon: 2R (1912)

Other doubles tournaments
- WHCC: W (1912)

Team competitions
- Davis Cup: SF (1913, 1914)
Medal record
Representing (Germany)
Tennis
Olympic Games
Silver medal – second place	1908 London	Singles

Otto Froitzheim (German pronunciation: [ɔto fʀøːtshaɪ̯m]; 24 April 1884 – 27 October 1962) was a German tennis player. He won the singles and doubles titles at the World Hard Court Championships in 1912. He also won an Olympic Silver medal in singles in 1908 and was a finalist at Wimbledon in 1914.

== Biography ==
Froitzheim was born in Strasbourg, then part of the German Empire, on 24 April 1884. His father worked as a teacher at the local lyceum, and his mother was the daughter of a doctor from the Rhineland. During his childhood, he practised several sports, including athletics, swimming, ice skating, and football. At the age of 16, he began playing tennis.

After graduating from school with the Abitur in 1901, Froitzheim began to study law at the University of Strasbourg. In 1902, he interrupted his studies for one year and served at the 138th Infantry Regiment at Strasbourg. In autumn 1903, following his military service, he continued his studies at the University of Bonn. In 1904, he passed the first law examination. In 1909, at the age of 25, he finished his studies with the second examination. Froitzheim then worked at the customs at Strasbourg.

Being kept a prisoner of war in an English detention camp for the duration of World War I, Frotzheim returned to Strasbourg in 1918 until French forces occupied Alsace-Lorraine. He then moved to Berlin, where he got a job in the police department with the task of fighting usury. Working as deputy police president at Cologne from 1923, he was assigned police president of Wiesbaden in autumn 1926. When the Nazi Party came to power in 1933, he was forced to quit because he refused to join the SA. However, with the support of Hermann Göring, who admired Froitzheim's successful international tennis career, Froitzheim was assigned vice president of the government at Aachen.

Froitzheim was engaged to Leni Riefenstahl, whom he had met in 1921, for some years and also had a love affair with Pola Negri in the 1920s. He died following a short illness in October 1962.

== Tennis career ==
In 1902, Froitzheim won his first tennis tournament, the championship of Alsace-Lorraine. Before World War I, he won the International German Championships in 1907 and from 1909 to 1911. At the 1908 Summer Olympics, he won a silver medal in the men's singles tournament. Another of his greatest victories was the title at the inaugural World Hard Court Championships on clay in the Paris suburb of Saint-Cloud in 1912, beating his compatriot Oscar Kreuzer in the final in four sets. In 1914, he advanced to the All-Comers final at the Wimbledon Championships, losing to Australian Norman Brookes in five sets. He was ranked world No. 4 in 1914 by A. Wallis Myers of The Daily Telegraph.

At the end of July 1914, he and Oskar Kreuzer played the semifinal of the International Lawn Tennis Challenge at Pittsburgh against Australasia. When World War I broke out, the president of the local tennis club kept this from Froitzheim and Kreuzer as he didn't want to disrupt the match. The German team lost 0–5. On their way back to Germany, their Italian steamboat America was halted off Gibraltar by a British warship, and they were placed in a prison in Gibraltar for several months before being sent to detention camps in England. While Kreuzer stayed at a camp near Leeds, officer Froitzheim was kept at Donnington Hall until the end of the war in 1918.

After the war, Froitzheim won the International German Championships again in 1921, 1922 and 1925. In 1927, at the age of 43, he reached the quarterfinals at the French Championships.

== World Championships finals ==
=== Singles (1 title) ===
Result	Year	Championship	Surface	Opponent	Score
Win	1912	World Hard Court Championships	Clay	(Germany) Oscar Kreuzer	6–2, 7–5, 4–6, 7–5

=== Doubles (1 title, 1 runner-up) ===
Result	Year	Championship	Surface	Partner	Opponents	Score
Win	1912	World Hard Court Championships	Clay	(Germany) Oscar Kreuzer	(South Africa) Harold Kitson (South Africa) Charles Winslow	4–6, 6–2, 6–1, 6–3
Loss	1913	World Hard Court Championships	Clay	(New Zealand) Anthony Wilding	(Germany) Moritz von Bissing (Germany) Heinrich Kleinschroth	5–7, 6–0, 3–6, 6–8
