= 1857 in literature =

This article contains information about the literary events and publications of 1857.

== Events ==
- January – 37-year-old George Eliot's Scenes of Clerical Life begin publication as a serial in Blackwood's Edinburgh Magazine through the year, as her first work of fiction and the first use of her pseudonym. The three stories are set during the last twenty years of the eighteenth century and the early nineteenth century over a fifty-year period and take place in and around the fictional town of Milby in the English Midlands. Each of the Scenes concerns a different Anglican clergyman, but is not necessarily centred upon him. Eliot examines, among other things, the effects of religious reform and the tension between the Established and the Dissenting Churches on the clergymen and their congregations, and draws attention to various social issues, such as poverty, alcoholism and domestic violence.
- January 5 – Wilkie Collins' drama The Frozen Deep is first presented in a private amateur performance featuring Charles Dickens, staged by him at his London home, Tavistock House.
- January 10 – Jules Verne marries Honorine de Viane Morel.

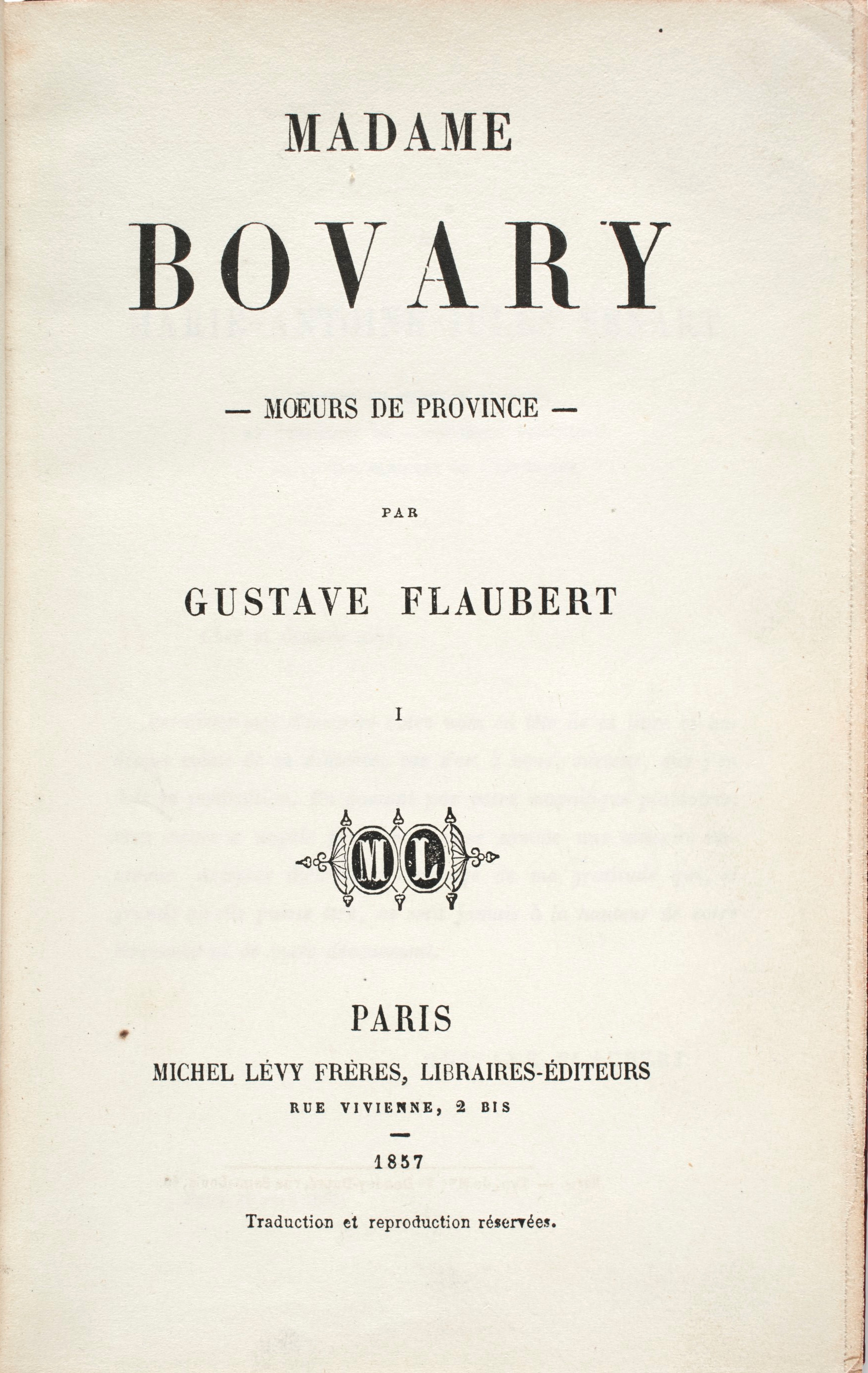

- February 7 – Gustave Flaubert's pioneering realist novel Madame Bovary is acquitted (but censured) on charges of offending morals and religion from its 1856 expurgated serialization. It is published complete in book form in April by Michel Lévy Frères in Paris.
- February 15 – The play Demetrius, left unfinished at Schiller's death in 1805, is premiered at the Hoftheater in Weimar.
- May 2 – The British Museum Reading Room opens in London.
- May 5 – American publisher Moses Phillips hosts a dinner for Ralph Waldo Emerson, Henry Wadsworth Longfellow, Oliver Wendell Holmes Sr., James Russell Lowell and other literary notables at the Parker House Hotel, Boston, Massachusetts, to agree on launching The Atlantic Monthly, "a magazine of literature, art, and politics", on November 1 with Lowell as first editor.
- June 25 – Charles Baudelaire's collection of poems Les Fleurs du mal is published in Paris. He will be convicted and six of the most decadent poems suppressed on charges of offending morals and religion.
- August 21–24 – Performances of Wilkie Collins' drama The Frozen Deep at the Free Trade Hall, Manchester, for the benefit of the widow of writer Douglas William Jerrold (died June 8), during which Charles Dickens, who is directing and performing, becomes infatuated with the professional actress Ellen Ternan.
- August 25 – Obscene Publications Act 1857 is passed in the United Kingdom, making the sale of obscene material a statutory offence (although it gives no definition of obscenity). William Dugdale, a prime target of the act, is one of the first to be charged under it. The Act is replaced with a less stringent one in 1959.
- September 25 – Eugène Sue's extended fiction Les Mystères du peuple is condemned on charges of offending morals and religion, the author having died on August 3.
- October – The Sacramento Library Association, predecessor of Sacramento Public Library, is established as a public subscription library in Sacramento, California, by members of the "Big Four" and other prominent citizens.
- November 1 – The Atlantic Monthly is first published, in Boston, Massachusetts, by Phillips, Sampson and Company.

== New books ==
=== Fiction ===
- William Harrison Ainsworth – The Spendthrift
- Hans Christian Andersen – To Be or Not to Be
- Matilda Betham-Edwards – The White House by the Sea
- George Borrow – The Romany Rye
- Charlotte Brontë (posthumously, as Currer Bell) – The Professor
- Juliet H. Lewis Campbell (as Judith Canute) – Eros and Antieros; or, The Bachelor's Ward
- Wilkie Collins – The Dead Secret
- Charles De Coster – Légendes flamandes
- Charles Dickens – Little Dorrit (complete in book form)
- Alexandre Dumas, père
  - The Companions of Jehu
  - The Wolf Leader
- Vintsent Dunin-Martsinkyevich – Ciekawyś? Przeczytaj! Trzy powiastki i wierszyk ulotny (Interested? Read it! Three tales and brief verse)
- Gustave Flaubert – Madame Bovary
- Théophile Gautier – Jettatura (The Jinx)
- Catherine Gore – The Two Aristocracies
- George A. Lawrence (anonymously) – Guy Livingstone, or Thorough
- Fitz Hugh Ludlow – The Hasheesh Eater
- Herman Melville – The Confidence-Man
- G. W. M. Reynolds – The Necromancer
- X. B. Saintine – Seul (Alone)
- Catharine Maria Sedgwick – Married or Single?
- María del Pilar Sinués de Marco - El ángel del hogar
- Adalbert Stifter – Der Nachsommer (Indian Summer)
- William Makepeace Thackeray – The Virginians (begins serialisation)
- Anthony Trollope – Barchester Towers

=== Children and young people ===
- R. M. Ballantyne
  - The Coral Island
  - Ungava: a Tale of Eskimo Land
- Clara de Chatelain – Little Folk's Books (initially in four volumes)
- Thomas Hughes – Tom Brown's Schooldays
- Annie Keary – The Heroes of Asgard (with Eliza Harriett Keary)

=== Drama ===
- Wilkie Collins (with Charles Dickens) – The Frozen Deep
- Ferdinand Dugué – William Shakespeare: drame en six actes
- Liautaud Ethéart – Le Monde de Chez Nous
- Charles Heavysege – Saul: a drama in three parts
- Henrik Ibsen – The Vikings at Helgeland (Hærmændene paa Helgeland)
- Andreas Munch – Lord William Russell
- Ramnarayan Tarkaratna – Kulīn-Kul-Sarbasva (A. Kulīn's All in All)

=== Poetry ===
- Charles Baudelaire – Les Fleurs du mal
- William Morris - The Defence of Guenevere

=== Non-fiction ===
- Louis Agassiz – Essay on Classification
- Delia Bacon – The Philosophy of Shakespeare's Plays Unfolded
- Elizabeth Gaskell – The Life of Charlotte Brontë
- Philip Gosse – Omphalos: An Attempt to Untie the Geological Knot
- Hinton Rowan Helper – The Impending Crisis of the South
- Chandos Wren-Hoskyns – Agricultural Statistics
- Washington Irving – The Life of George Washington, Volume 4
- Allan Kardec – The Spirits' Book
- David Livingstone – Missionary Travels and Researches in South Africa
- John David Macbride – The Mohammedan Religion Explained. With an Introductory Sketch of its Progress, and Suggestions for its Confutation
- Désiré van Monckhoven – Méthodes simplifiées de photographie sur papier (Simplified Methods of Photography on Paper)
- William Smith (editor) – Dictionary of Greek and Roman Geography

== Births ==
- February 7 – Benjamin Eli Smith, American editor of reference books (died 1913)
- February 9 – A. H. Bullen, English editor and publisher (died 1920)
- February 23 – Margaret Deland, American novelist (died 1945)
- February 27 – Agnes Mary Frances Duclaux, née Robinson, English-born poet, biographer and novelist (died 1944)
- March 27 – Ella Hepworth Dixon, English writer, novelist and editor (died 1932)
- May 21 – Frances Brackett Damon, American writer (died 1939)
- May 28 – Annie Maria Barnes, American journalist, editor, and author (died, date unknown)
- July – Adriana Porter, American Wiccan poet (died 1946)
- July 24 – Henrik Pontoppidan, Danish Nobel Prize-winning author (died 1943)
- September 30 – Hermann Sudermann, German dramatist and novelist (died 1928)
- October 5 – Peadar Toner Mac Fhionnlaoich, Irish Gaelic writer (died 1942)
- October 31 – Axel Munthe, Swedish physician and author (died 1949)
- November 22 – George Gissing, English novelist and critic (died 1903)
- November 26 – Ferdinand de Saussure, Swiss linguist (died 1913)
- December 3 – Joseph Conrad (Józef Teodor Konrad Korzeniowski), Polish-born English novelist and story writer (died 1924)
- December 4 – Julia Ditto Young, American poet and novelist (died 1915)

== Deaths ==
- January 5 – Albert Schwegler, German philosopher and theologian (born 1819)
- February 3 – Robert Wilberforce, English historian and religious writer (born 1802)
- March 11 – Manuel José Quintana, Spanish poet (born 1772)
- March 26 – John Mitchell Kemble, English historian (born 1807)
- April 19 – Elizabeth Wynne Fremantle, English diarist (born 1778)
- May 2 – Alfred de Musset, French novelist and poet (heart failure, born 1810)
- June 8 – Douglas William Jerrold, English dramatist (born 1803)
- June 25 – Isabella Kelly, Scottish novelist and poet (born 1759)
- July 29 – James Holman, English travel writer (born 1786)
- August 3 – Eugène Sue, French novelist (born 1804)
- August 10 – John Wilson Croker, Irish writer and statesman (born 1780)
- September 5 – Auguste Comte, French philosopher (born 1798)
- September 18 – Jean Baptiste Gustave Planche, French critic (born 1808)
- November 26 – Joseph Freiherr von Eichendorff, German poet and novelist (born 1788)
- December 13 – Richard Furness, English poet (born 1791)

== Awards ==
- Newdigate Prize – Philip Stanhope Worsley
