= L. Forbes Winslow =

British psychiatrist (1844–1913)

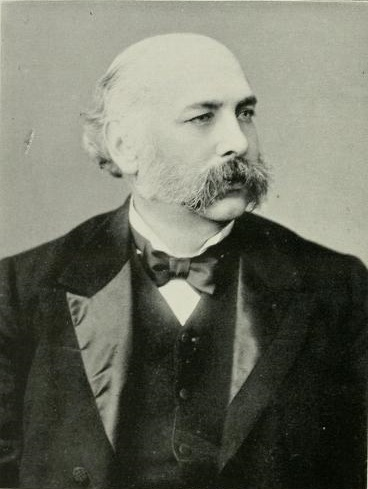
- Picture of L. Forbes Winslow, by Bassano, 1898
- Born: Lyttelton Stewart Forbes Winslow; 30 January 1844; Marylebone, London
- Died: 8 June 1913 (aged 69); Portland Place, London
- Parent: Forbes Benignus Winslow
- Relatives: Octavius Winslow (uncle)

Lyttelton Stewart Forbes Winslow MRCP (31 January 1844 – 8 June 1913) was a British psychiatrist, possibly the most controversial one of his time, famous for his involvement in the Jack the Ripper and Georgina Weldon cases during the late Victorian era.

He was a lecturer on insanity at Charing Cross Hospital and a physician to the West End Hospital and the North London Hospital for Consumption, as well as founder of the British Hospital for Mental Disorders in London and a vice-president of the Psycho—Therapeutic Society.

== Life ==
=== Childhood and education ===
Born in Marylebone in London, the son of psychiatrist Forbes Benignus Winslow and Susan Winslow née Holt, his older brother was Edward Winslow Forbes, the vicar of Epping and his sister Susanna Frances married the humourist Arthur William à Beckett. As a boy he was brought up in lunatic asylums owned by his father, and was educated at Rugby School.

He began at Gonville and Caius College, Cambridge, transferring to Downing College at the University of Cambridge after four terms, where he took the MB degree in 1870. He was also a DCL (1873) of Trinity College Oxford and LL.D. of Cambridge University. A keen cricketer, Winslow captained the Downing College XI. In July 1864 he was a member of the Marylebone Cricket Club (MCC) team which played against South Wales, in which team was W. G. Grace.

=== 1870s ===
In 1871 he was appointed a Member of the Royal College of Physicians (MRCP). He spent his medical career in an attempt to persuade the courts that crime and alcoholism were the result of mental instability. He also managed his father's asylums after his death in 1874, but these were removed from his control following a family feud, so he turned his attention to forensic work. Also in 1874 he changed his surname to Forbes-Winslow. His attempt in 1878 to have Mrs Georgina Weldon committed as a lunatic at the instigation of her estranged husband William Weldon resulted in one of the most notorious court cases of the nineteenth century. The public notoriety the Weldon case caused earned him the displeasure of the medical establishment, which continued even after his death.

He became an adherent of the benefits of hypnotism in dealing with psychiatric cases. He took an active role in securing a reprieve for the four people sentenced to death for the murder by starvation of Mrs. Harriet Staunton at Penge in 1877. In the same year he wrote Handbook For Attendants on the Insane and the pamphlet Spiritualistic Madness. The latter work identified spiritualism as a cause of insanity. He wrote that many believers in spiritualism were women and victims of their own gullibility. Winslow wrote that most believers in spiritualism were insane and suffer from mental delusions. He affirmed that there were "nearly ten thousand [such] persons in America" who had been confined in lunatic asylums.

In 1878 he inquired into the mental condition of the Rev. Mr. Dodwell, who had shot at Sir George Jessel, the Master of the Rolls.

=== Jack the Ripper ===
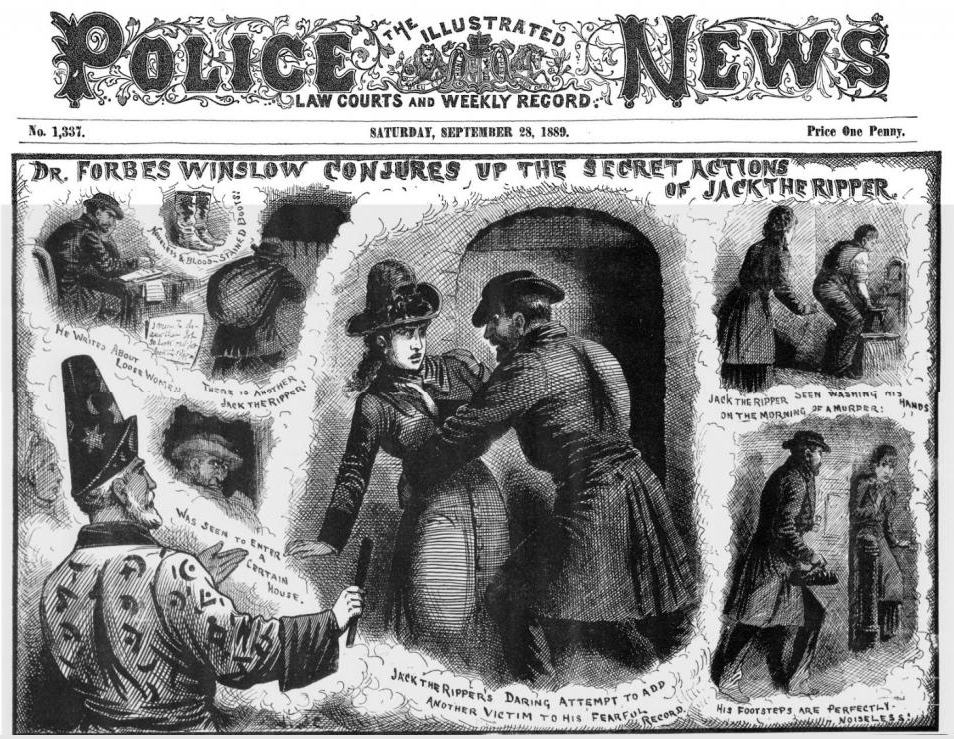
Forbes Winslow conjures up the secret actions of Jack the Ripper, from the Illustrated Police News

In 1888, with a little manipulation of the evidence, Winslow came to believe he knew the identity of Jack the Ripper, and believed that if he was given a team of six police constables he could catch the murderer. His suspect was Canadian G. Wentworth Smith, who had come to London to work for the Toronto Trust Society, and who lodged with a Mr and Mrs Callaghan at 27 Sun Street, Finsbury Square. Mr Callaghan became suspicious of Smith when he was heard saying that all prostitutes should be drowned. Smith also talked and moaned to himself, and kept three loaded revolvers hidden in a chest of drawers.

Photographic portrait of L. Forbes Winslow, c.1890

Callaghan went to Winslow to express his suspicions, and he in turn contacted the police, who fully investigated his theory and showed it to be without foundation. In his 1910 memoirs Winslow describes how he spent days and nights in Whitechapel: "The detectives knew me, the lodging house keepers knew me, and at last the poor creatures of the streets came to know me. In terror they rushed to me with every scrap of information which might, to my mind, be of value to me. The frightened women looked for hope in my presence. They felt reassured and welcomed me to their dens and obeyed my commands eagerly, and I found the bits of information I wanted". According to Donald McCormick, for a short period the police suspected Winslow of involvement in the killings because of his persistence and constant agitation in the Jack the Ripper case, and they checked on his movements at the time of the Ripper murders.

When Winslow's claims about knowing the identity of the Ripper were reported in the English press Scotland Yard sent Chief Inspector Donald Swanson to interview him. Confronted with this senior police officer, Forbes Winslow immediately began to back-pedal. He said the story printed in the newspaper was not accurate and misrepresented the entire conversation between himself and the reporter. He further stated that the reporter had tricked him into talking about the Ripper murders. Winslow had never given any information to the police with the exception of his earlier theory concerning an escaped lunatic, which he had by then abandoned.

Nevertheless, convinced that he was correct, for many years Winslow declared his theory at every chance, and claimed that his actions were responsible for forcing Jack the Ripper into abandoning murder and fleeing the country. He appears as the central figure in the 2003 novel A Handbook for Attendants on the Insane, since republished in a new edition as The Revelation of Jack the Ripper by Alan Scarfe.

=== Later life ===
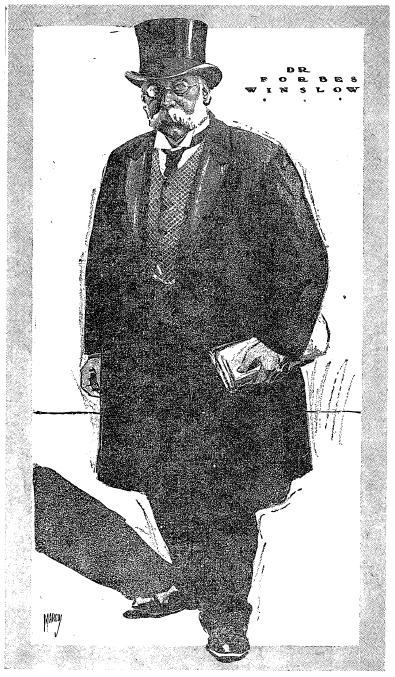
Forbes Winslow in 1910

In the 1880s, he was the owner of the famous progenitor of the modern English Mastiff, Ch. Crown Prince. He was involved in the trials of Percy Lefroy Mapleton (1881), Florence Maybrick (1889) and Amelia Dyer (1896) and also appeared in many civil actions and some American cases involving lunacy.

He visited New York City in August 1895 to chair a meeting on lunacy at an International Medico-Legal Congress. He published his memoirs under the title Recollections of Forty Years in 1910 and died at his home in Devonshire Street, London, of a heart attack, aged 69.

He had married twice and on his death he left a widow, three sons and a daughter, Dulcie Sylvia, who, in 1906, married Roland St John Braddell (1880–1966).

== In popular culture ==
He was portrayed by Tim Seely in the Granada Television series Lady Killers, in an episode depicting the trial of Amelia Dyer.

== Arms ==
Coat of arms of Winslow of Droitwich
Notes Right by virtue of being a descendant of Edward Winslow Crest A branch with growing twigs Proper Escutcheon Argent, on a bend Gules, 7 lozenges conjoined (assumed Argent).

== Works ==
- Obscure Diseases of the Mind (1866)
- Handbook For Attendants On The Insane (1877)
- Spiritualistic Madness (1877)
- Mad Humanity: Its Forms Apparent and Obscure (1898)
- Recollections of Forty Years (1910)
