= Forbes Winslow =

British psychiatrist (1810 – 1874)

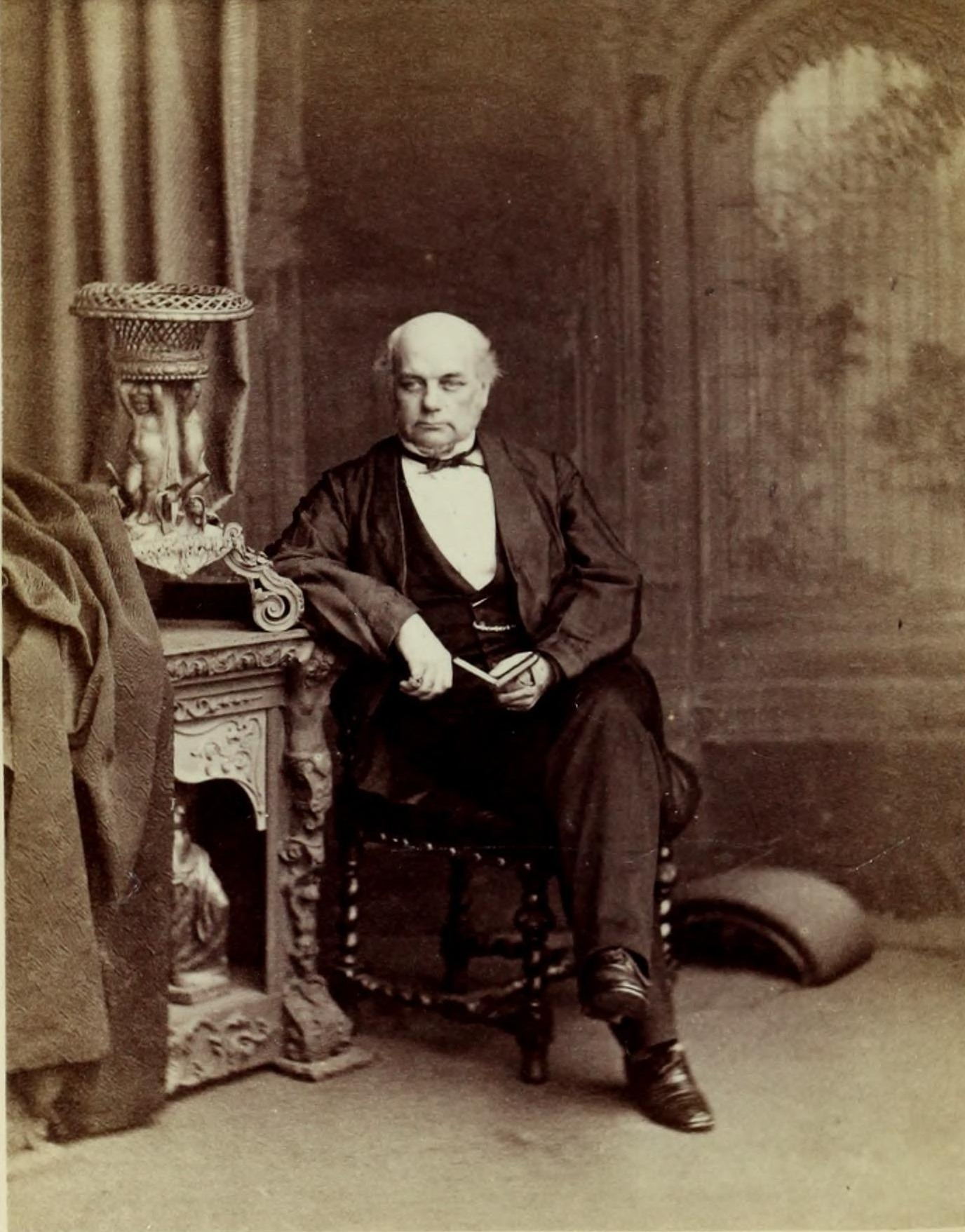
Forbes Benignus Winslow in 1864

Forbes Benignus Winslow DCL, FRCP Edin., MRCP, MRCS, MD, (10 August 1810 – 3 March 1874) was a British psychiatrist, author and an authority on mental illness during the Victorian era.

== Biography ==
Winslow was the ninth son of Thomas Winslow (1772–1815), a captain in the 47th Regiment of Foot, and his wife, Mary (née Forbes) (1774–1854). He was born at Pentonville in August 1810. One of his brothers was Octavius Winslow. The family lost their American property in the American War of Independence and came to England. After education in Scotland, in 1820, aged 10, Forbes Winslow travelled to New York where he continued his education before returning to Britain to study medicine.

After education at University College London, and at Middlesex Hospital, where he was a pupil of Sir Charles Bell, he became a member of the Royal College of Surgeons of England in 1835, and graduated MD at the University of Aberdeen in 1849. He had to pay the expenses of his own medical education by acting as a reporter for The Times in the gallery of the House of Commons, and by writing small manuals for students on osteology, and on practical midwifery.

The Arms of Forbes Winslow as descendant of Edward Winslow

In 1839 he published, anonymously Physic and Physicians, in two volumes, a collection of miscellaneous anecdotes about physicians and surgeons; and in 1840 The Anatomy of Suicide, which tried to show that most suicides are not criminal, but are victims of mental disease. This was followed in 1843 by The Plea of Insanity in Criminal Cases, and in 1845 by The Incubation of Insanity. He was now regarded by the public as an authority in cases of insanity, and in 1847 opened two private lunatic asylums at Hammersmith, where he employed the humane method of treating lunatics which is now universal, but was then regarded as on its trial. He founded the Quarterly Journal of Psychological Medicine in 1848, and continued it for sixteen years. He became FRCP Edin. in 1850 and MRCP in 1859. When the Earl of Derby was installed as Chancellor of the University of Oxford, the honorary degree of DCL was conferred on Winslow on 9 June 1853. With Dr Tyler Smith and Dr James Yearsley he founded the Medical Directory.

He continued to write numerous papers on insanity and on its relation to the laws, and in 1860 published On the Obscure Diseases of the Brain and Mind, a work containing many interesting cases. In 1865, after recovering from a serious illness, he wrote Light and its Influence and a short essay On Uncontrollable Drunkenness. He was examined before a committee of the House of Commons in 1872 on this subject. The frequent establishment of the plea of insanity in criminal cases was largely due to his influence, and he was called as a witness in many celebrated trials. He died at Brighton on 3 March 1874, and was buried in the family vault at Epping. The Medical Circular for 16 March 1853 contains his portrait, engraved from a daguerreotype.

In 1841 he married Susannah Holt (1811–1883). His eldest son, the Revd Forbes Edward Winslow, was vicar of Epping. His second son, Lyttelton Stewart Forbes Winslow, graduated in medicine and, like his father, became a noted psychiatrist. L. Forbes Winslow became famous for his involvement in the Jack the Ripper and Georgina Weldon cases. Forbes Benignus Winslow's daughter, Susanna Frances, married the humourist Arthur William à Beckett. Another daughter was Constance Winslow (1850-1925).
