= Octavius Winslow (cricketer) =

English cricketer

Personal information
- Full name: Octavius Evans Winslow
- Born: 10 September 1850; Leamington Spa, Warwickshire, England
- Died: 13 October 1896 (aged 46); Bermondsey, London, England
- Batting: Right-handed
- Bowling: Right-arm roundarm medium

Domestic team information
- Years: Team
- 1869: Sussex

Career statistics
Competition	First-class
Matches	5
Runs scored	207
Batting average	20.70
100s/50s	–/1
Top score	56
Balls bowled	–
Wickets	–
Bowling average	–
5 wickets in innings	–
10 wickets in match	–
Best bowling	–
Catches/stumpings	1/–
- Source: Cricinfo, 15 January 2012

Octavius Evans Winslow (10 September 1850 – 13 October 1896) was an English cricketer. Winslow was a right-handed batsman who bowled right-arm roundarm medium.

Winslow made his first-class debut for Sussex against Surrey in 1869. He made four further first-class appearances in that season, the last of which came against Surrey. In his only season of first-class cricket, he scored 207 runs at an average of 20.70, with a high score of 56. This score was the only fifty he made and came against Kent.

Winslow was born at Leamington, Warwickshire, the son of evangelical preacher Octavius Winslow and Hannah Ann Ring. His younger brother, Lyndhurst, also played first-class cricket for Sussex. He died at Bermondsey, London on 13 October 1896.
