= Miriam Isabel Davis =

English painter

- Born: 1856; London, United Kingdom
- Died: 20 February 1927 (aged 70–71)
- Resting place: Willesden Jewish Cemetery, London Borough of Brent
- Education: Bloomsbury School of Art
- Spouse: Henry Morris Imano (né Hyman) (m. 1904; died 1907)

Miriam Isabel Davis (1856 – 20 February 1927) was an English painter, best known for her portrait, floral and genre scene paintings.

== Biography ==
Davis was born in London to Jewish parents Eliza and James Phineas Davis. Her mother was a correspondent of Charles Dickens, whose former home at Tavistock House the Davis family inhabited.

After making a tour of the galleries of Venice, Florence, and Rome, Davis began a systematic course of artistic study at London's Bloomsbury School of Art. Her artistic career began in 1882 when her work was exhibited by the Society of Lady Artists. In 1887 a painting by her entitled New Music was hung at the Royal Academy, and in 1889 she contributed to the Paris Salon. Among her other works are Winter Harmonies (1887), A Shady Seat (1888), The Last of the Season (1889), White and Gold (1890, exhibited at the New Gallery), Pure Emblems of Pleasure (1891, exhibited at the Royal Academy), and Simplicité (1892, shown at the Paris Salon). From 1895 Davis was engaged in portrait painting, but remained well known for her flower subjects. She exhibited often at the Society of Women Painters, of which she was one of the founders.

In 1904 she married Cornish Jewish opera singer Henry Morris Imano (né Hyman), who toured with the D'Oyly Carte Opera Company.
