= Felix Pipes =

Austrian tennis player

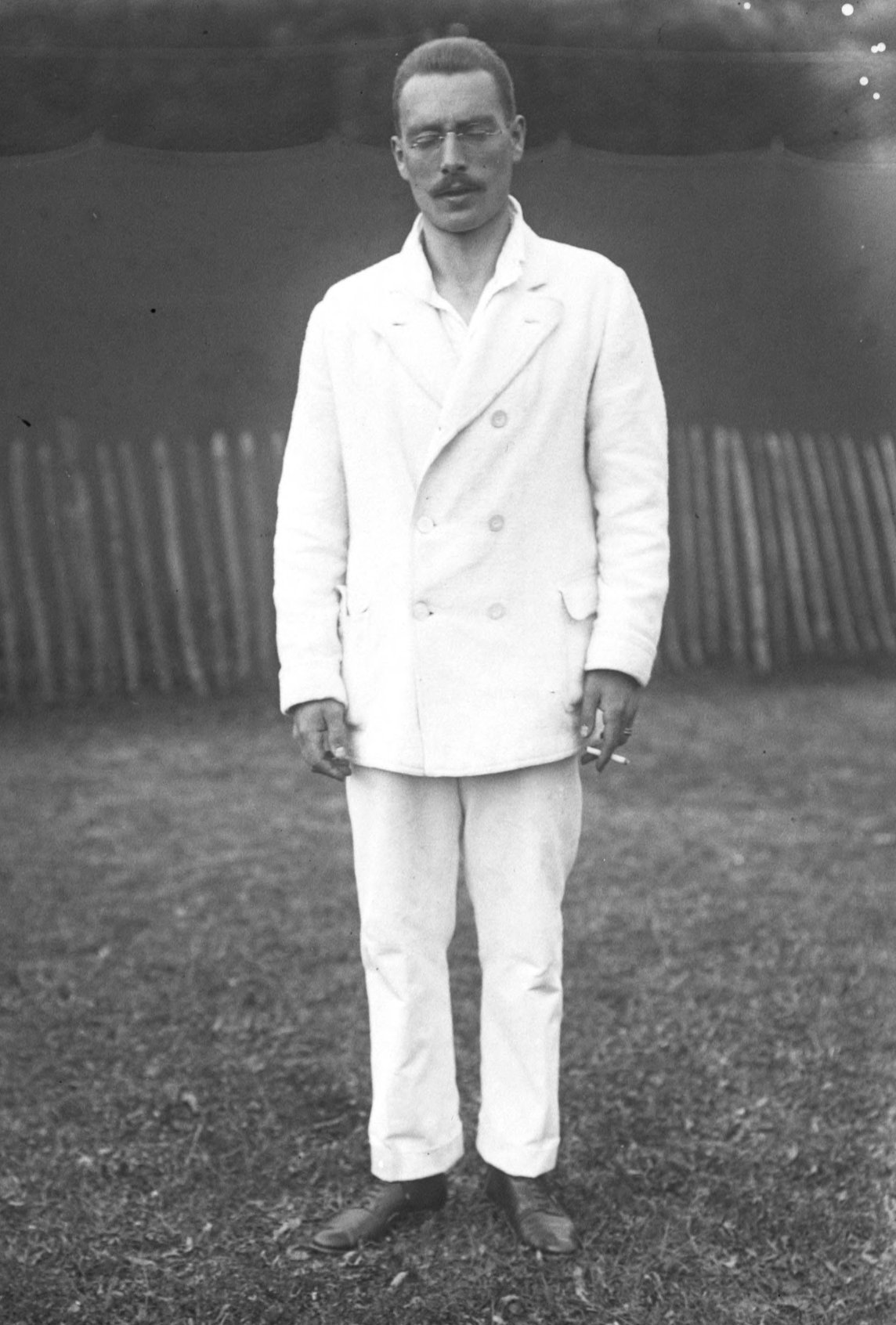
- Full name: Fritz Felix Pipes
- Country (sports): Austria
- Born: 15 April 1887 Prague Austria-Hungary
- Died: 20 January 1983 (aged 95) Seattle, Washington, United States

Other tournaments
- WHCC: 2R (1913)
- Olympic Games: 1R (1908)
Medal record
Representing Austrian Empire
Olympic Games – Tennis
Silver medal – second place	1912 Stockholm	Doubles

Fritz Felix Pipes (also "Piepes"; 15 April 1887 – 20 January 1983) was an Austrian tennis player who was born in Prague. He was Jewish, and was a medical doctor. At the 1912 Stockholm Olympics he teamed up with Arthur Zborzil to win a silver medal for Austria in the men's doubles event.

He also competed for Austria in singles in 1912, and in both singles and doubles (with Zborzil) at the 1908 Summer Olympics.

He was runner-up in the Austrian International Championship in both 1909 and 1913. He twice played at the World Hard Court Championships, losing in round one of singles in 1912 and in the quarterfinals of mixed doubles in 1912, and in round two in 1913.

== Olympic finals ==
=== Doubles (1 silver medal) ===
Result	Year	Location	Surface	Partner	Opponents	Score
Silver	1912	Summer Olympics, Stockholm	Clay	(Austrian Empire) Arthur Zborzil	(South Africa) Harold Kitson (South Africa) Charles Winslow	6–4, 1–6, 2–6, 2–6

== See also ==
- List of select Jewish tennis players
