= Lyndhurst Winslow =

English cricketer

Personal information
- Full name: Lyndhurst Winslow
- Born: 10 January 1855; Leamington, Warwickshire, England
- Died: 6 February 1915 (aged 60); Johannesburg, Transvaal Province, South Africa
- Batting: Right-handed
- Bowling: Unknown
- Relatives: Octavius Evans Winslow (brother); Paul Winslow (grandson)

Domestic team information
- Years: Team
- 1875: Marylebone Cricket Club
- 1875: Sussex

Career statistics
| Competition | First-class |
|---|---|
| Matches | 8 |
| Runs scored | 337 |
| Batting average | 30.63 |
| 100s/50s | 1/1 |
| Top score | 124 |
| Balls bowled | 20 |
| Wickets | – |
| Bowling average | – |
| 5 wickets in innings | – |
| 10 wickets in match | – |
| Best bowling | – |
| Catches/stumpings | 4/– |
- Source: Cricinfo, 4 July 2012

Lyndhurst Winslow (10 January 1855 – 6 February 1915) was an English cricketer. Winslow was a right-handed batsman. The son of evangelical preacher Octavius Winslow and Hannah Ann Ring, he was born at Leamington, Warwickshire.

Winslow made his first-class debut for Sussex against Gloucestershire in 1875 at the County Ground, Hove. He scored a century in his maiden innings, making 124 runs. His second first-class appearance came shortly after this match, for the Marylebone Cricket Club against Cambridge University at Lord's. Immediately following this match, he made a two first-class appearances in quick succession, for the Gentlemen of the South against the Players of the South at The Oval, and for the South against the North at Trent Bridge. He made four further first-class appearances in 1875, all for Sussex, with his final appearance coming against Gloucestershire at the College Ground, Cheltenham. In total, Winslow made eight first-class appearances, scoring 337 runs at an average of 30.63.

He later emigrated to South Africa. In 1891 he was runner-up at the inaugural South African Championships tennis tournament in Port Elizabeth. Winslow died in Johannesburg on 6 February 1915. His son, Charles, was a three time Olympic tennis medalist. He won two gold medals, once each in the men's singles and doubles at the 1912 Summer Olympics in Stockholm. Eight years later, in Antwerp, he won a bronze medal in the men's singles event. Charles' son and Lyndhurst's grandson, Paul, would play Test cricket for South Africa. Winslow's brother, Octavius Evans Winslow, was also a first-class cricketer.
