= Octavius Winslow =

English preacher (1808 – 1878)

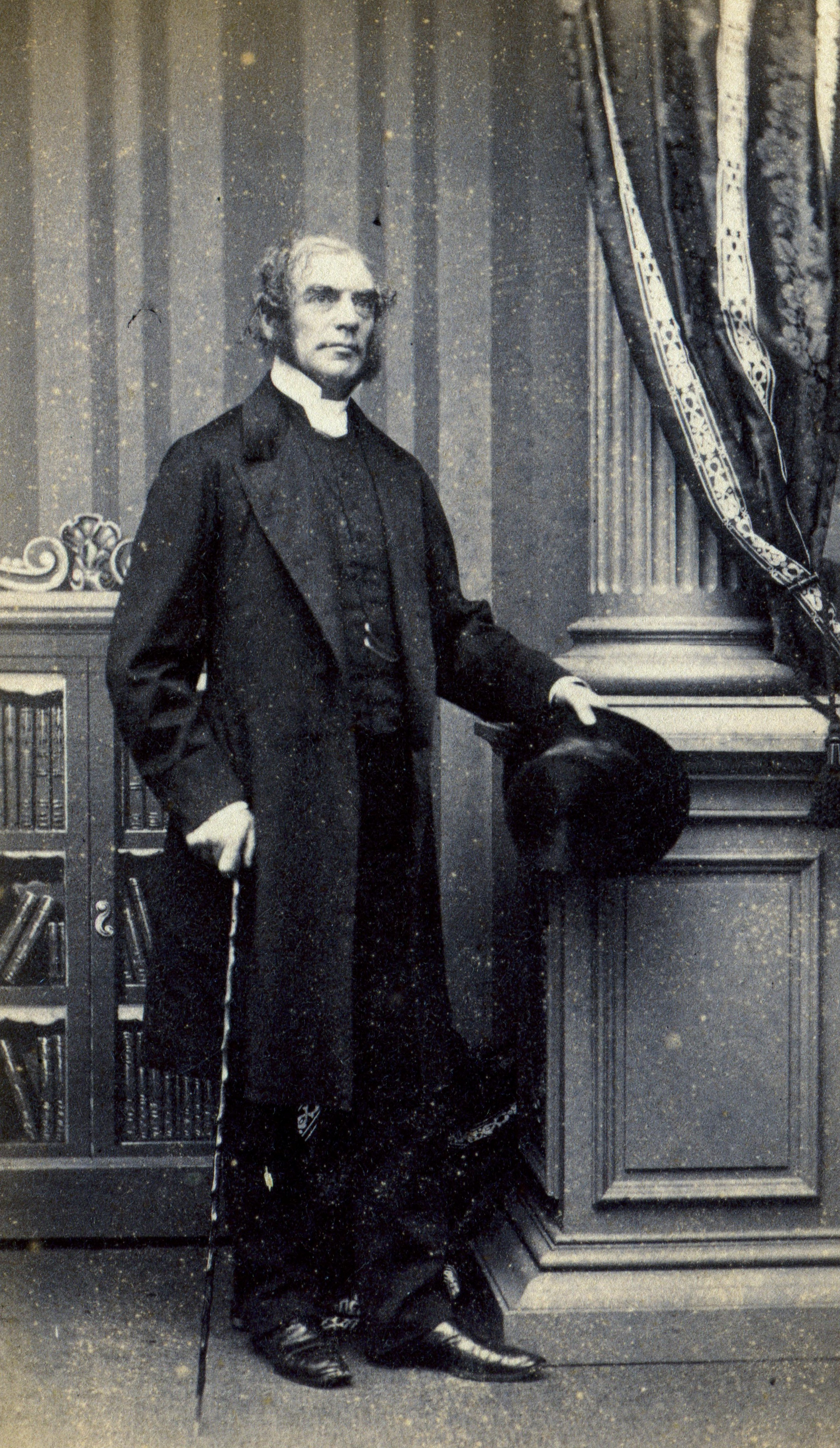
- Born: 1 August 1808; Pentonville, England
- Died: 5 March 1878 (aged 69); Brighton, England
- Occupations: Pastor, author
- Spouse(s): Hannah Ann Ring (2 April 1834)
- Children: 10

Octavius Winslow (1 August 1808 – 5 March 1878), also known as "The Pilgrim's Companion", was a prominent 19th-century evangelical preacher in England and America. A Baptist minister for most of his life and contemporary of Charles Spurgeon and J. C. Ryle, he seceded to the Anglican church in his last decade.

== Historical family information ==
Winslow was a direct descendant of John Winslow and Mary Chilton who braved the Atlantic to travel to America on the Mayflower in 1620. Legend has it that Mary was the first female of the little band to set foot in the New World. In 1624 she married John, brother to Edward Winslow (1595–1655), a celebrated Pilgrim leader.

== Early life ==
Octavius's mother, Mary Forbes (1774–1854) had Scottish roots but was born and raised in Bermuda and was the only child of Dr. and Mrs George Forbes. On 6 September 1791, when she was just 17, she married Army Lieutenant Thomas Winslow of the 47th Regiment. Shortly after this, she came under spiritual convictions and was brought to gospel deliverance while pleading the promise, “Ask, and ye shall receive”.

Mary and Thomas Winslow lived in England and Octavius was born in Pentonville, then a village near London, on 1 August 1808. He was the eighth of thirteen children. Those children recorded in the family Bible of Robert Winslow, brother of Octavius, are:

- Thomas Forbes (1795)
- Isaac Deblois (1799)
- Edward (1801)
- George Erving (1804)
- Henry James (1806)
- Robert Forbes (1807)
- Octavius (1808)
- Forbes (1810)
- Emma (1813)
- Mary (1814)

Thomas and Mary had three children who died before their first birthday. They are:

- Mary (1814)
- Robert Deblois (1798)
- Mary Elizabeth (1803).

Octavius seems to have been given his name because he was then the eighth surviving child.

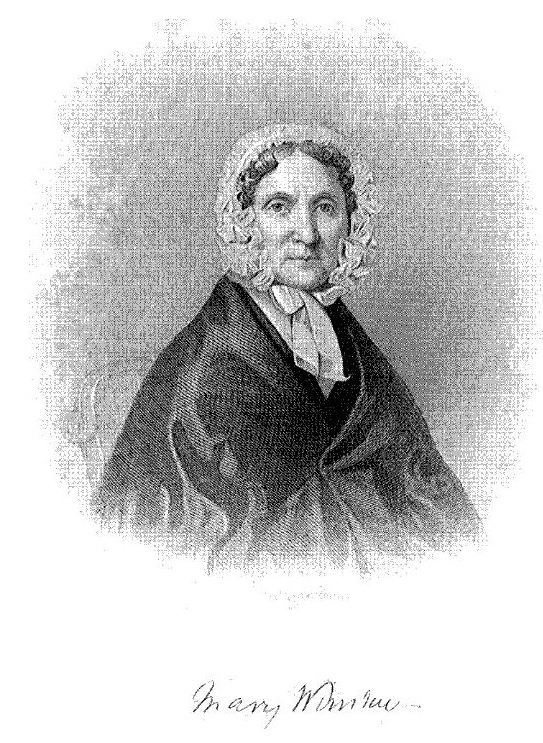
Mary Winslow

As a child, Octavius and family would worship at Pentonville Chapel under the ministry of Rev. Thomas Sheppard. During this time of his life, he suffered from what seemed to be a life-threatening illness. While staying in Twickenham, a nurse accidentally administered an incorrect medicine that doctors would later say would have killed ten men. Octavius's father was from a wealthy family but by 1815, following his retirement from the army, he suffered ill-health and the loss of his fortune due to one of several national financial disasters that occurred in this period. A decision was soon made to move to America, but before Mr. Winslow could join his wife and children in New York, he died. At the same time, their youngest child died too. Octavius was 7 years old.

Widowed at 40, responsible for a large family, and scarcely settled in America, Mrs Winslow's entire life was turned upside down. Worst of all, spiritual darkness and despondency overwhelmed her for many months. They were a deeply religious family and Octavius later wrote a book about their experiences from his mother's perspective entitled Life in Jesus.

Family historian D. Kenelm Winslow recorded their plight:

Mary had the youngsters out on the streets of New York selling matches and newspapers as soon as they were old enough for such tasks. She set them to any job they could tackle, gathering them around her at night for scripture reading followed by a good sound evangelical harangue and prayers.

Mary and her children lived in New York City until 1820. Then, after a four-month visit back to England, they moved to Sing Sing, New York on the Hudson River for "four years of congenial repose". In 1824, they would move back to New York City for a season of "special revival" where brothers Octavius, Isaac, and George would become converted and later convinced of God's calling to ministry.

Winslow was saved under the ministry of Samuel Eastman, pastor of Stanton Street Baptist Church in New York City. On Wednesday, 11 April 1827, Octavius shared his testimony and professed his faith in his Saviour. He was later baptized in the Hudson River on the Sunday 6 May at 4pm. Mary later wrote:

My children are earnestly engaged in bringing sinners where the Holy Ghost is displaying His mighty power. They visit from house to house, dealing faithfully with all they meet who know not God.

== Education and American Ministry ==
It is suggested that Winslow began his ministerial training in Stepney, London, but then moved to Columbia College, New York. Twice he was granted the privilege of receiving honorary degrees. The first was a Masters of Arts (M.A.) by the University of the City of New York (NYU) in 1836. Secondly, in 1851, Columbia College in New York City conferred upon him the honorary degree of Doctor of Divinity (D.D.). The second degree was given mostly because of the body and scope of his written works. Winslow's official ordination would later be on 21 July 1833 at the Oliver Street Baptist Church.

After completing a short service as a moderator at a Stanton Street church, he was dismissed on 18 May 1831 and he went on to found or "plant" the 20 member Bowery Baptist Church which was organized in March 1833 and met in the Military Hall on the Bowery. After meeting in this Hall for a year, they relocated to Broadway Hall and renamed the church Central Baptist Church. These years would bring the church a "moderate degree of prosperity" and would bring Winslow trials of depression. When Winslow would later leave this flock, there would be no written records as to why he left.

He is said to have ministered in the newly started Second Baptist Church there in Brooklyn on the corner of Tillary and Lawrence Streets in 1836 and 1837, the work sadly closing in 1838 and the church was sold to the Free Presbyterian congregation. In 1839 he moved back to England where he became one of the most valued ministers of his time. This was largely due to the earnestness of his preaching and the excellence of his prolific writings.

== Marriage and children ==
The Arms of Octavius Winslow as descendant of Edward Winslow

On 2 April 1834, Winslow married Miss Hannah Ann Ring, only daughter of Roland Z. Ring. They had 10 children:

- John Whitmore (1834 America)
- Hannah (1835 America)
- Mary (1837 America)
- James (1840)
- Thomas (1842)
- Emma (1845)
- Sarah Johanna (1848)
- Octavius Evans (1850) – played one season of first-class cricket for Sussex.
- Georgiana Lyndhurst (1853)
- Lyndhurst (1855) – played first-class cricket for Sussex and the Marylebone Cricket Club. His grandson and Octavius' great-grandson, Paul Winslow, would play Test cricket for South Africa.

His son, John Whitmore Winslow, died in 1856 at age 21 and Octavius went on to publish some of the things he had written as a teenager. His daughter Sarah Johanna died on 3 July 1848. Then, years later on 3 October 1854, his beloved mother Mary died. Hannah Ann, his faithful wife, died on 9 October 1866. Octavius never remarried.

== Ministry in England ==
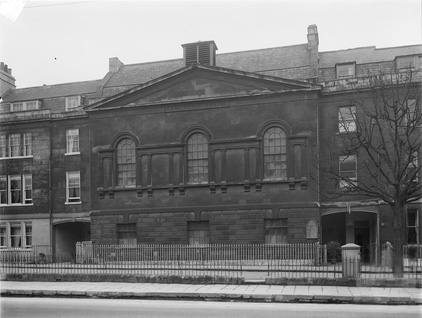
Kensington Chapel, Bath

Winslow spent most of his life in England. He pastored a Baptist church on Warwick Road in Leamington Spa, Warwickshire (1839–1858) where he followed Rev. D.J . East. In 1858 he became the founder and first minister of Kensington Chapel, Bath. In 1865 the church became a Union Church (mixed baptist and paedobaptist). This latter event probably marks a changing attitude in Winslow who in 1867 left the Baptist pastorate and in 1870 was ordained an Anglican deacon and priest by the Bishop of Chichester. For his remaining years he served as minister of Emmanuel Church, Brighton, on the south coast. In 1868 he had produced a hymn book for this very congregation. This church was destroyed in 1965 and a Baptist church erected in its place.

== Selected works ==
- Precious Things of God
- The Work of the Holy Spirit: An Experimental and Practical View
- Go and Tell Jesus
- None Like Christ
- The Ministry of the Home
- Personal Declension and Revival of Religion in the Soul
- Objections to a Baptist Version of the New Testament: With Additional Reasons for Preferring the English Bible as It Is (1837)
- The Tree of Life; its Shade, Fruit and Repose (1869)

== Death ==
Winslow died, following a short illness, on 5 March 1878, in Brighton at the age of 69. His obituary attributed his death to heart disease. He was buried in Bath Abbey Cemetery alongside his wife Hannah Ann Winslow and his sister Emma who died on 21 December 1890 at the age of 78.

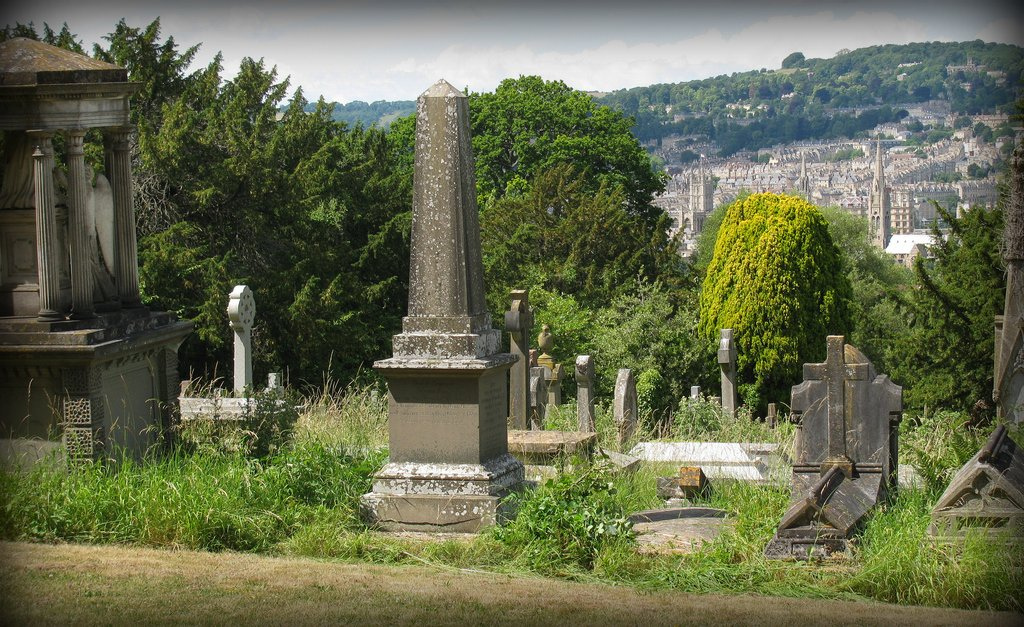
Gravesite of Octavius and Hannah Winslow along with Ann Winslow (Sister).

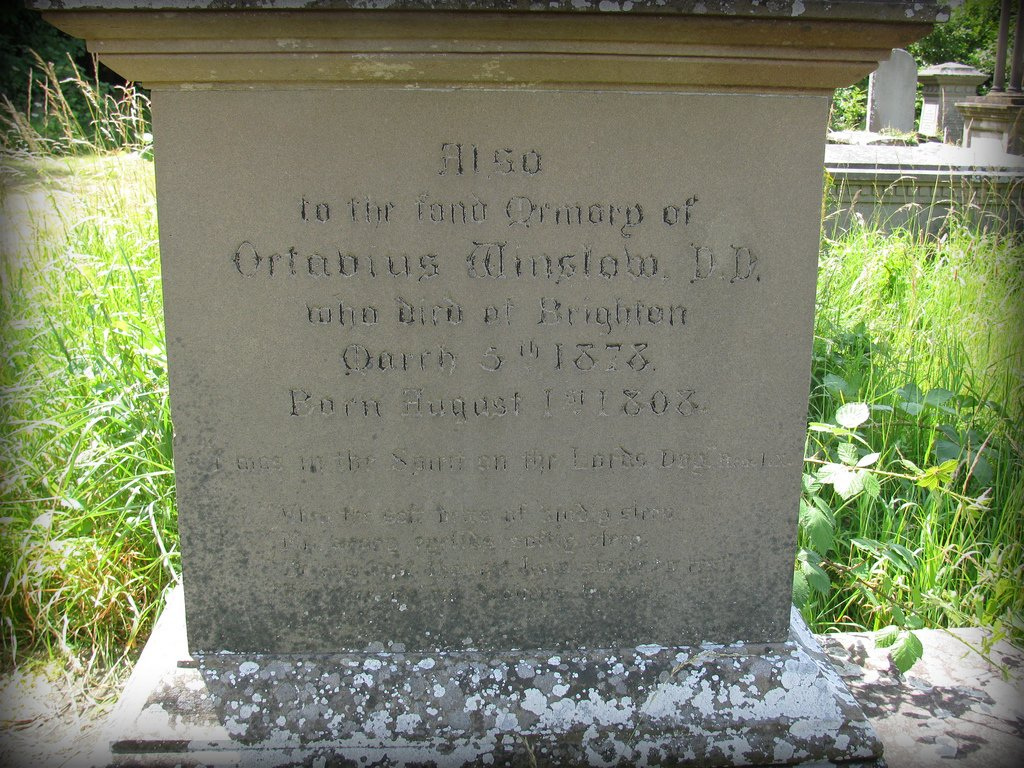
Detail of the Octavius portion of obelisk.
