= Tavistock House =

One-time home of Charles Dickens

Coordinates: 51.5255°N 0.1286°W

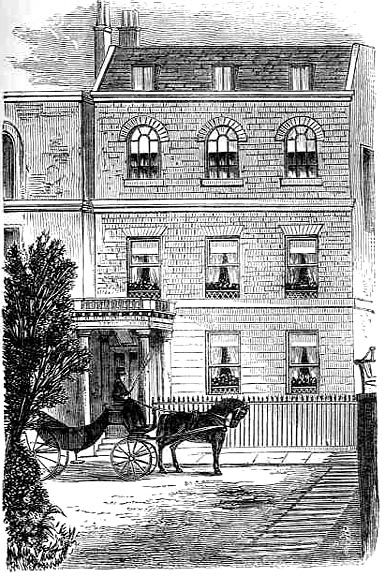
Tavistock House

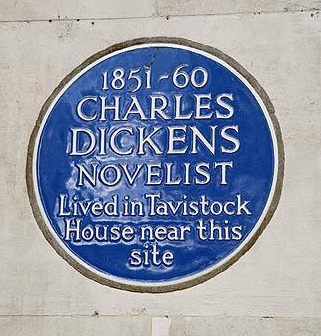
Blue plaque on the BMA building commemorating Dickens and Tavistock House

Tavistock House was the London home of the noted British author Charles Dickens and his family from 1851 to 1860. At Tavistock House, Dickens wrote Bleak House, Hard Times, Little Dorrit and A Tale of Two Cities. He also put on amateur theatricals there which are described in John Forster's Life of Charles Dickens. Later, it was the home of William and Georgina Weldon, whose lodger was the French composer Charles Gounod, who composed part of his opera Polyeucte at the house.

Tavistock House was demolished in 1901.

== History ==
Tavistock House was built by builder and developer James Burton, who probably lived in Tavistock House while he developed the surrounding area. From Francis Russell, 5th Duke of Bedford, Burton acquired the leases for two plots of land, one northern and one southern, on the east side of Tavistock Square. It was on the northern plot, and part of the southern plot, that Burton built Tavistock House. Burton sold the lease for Tavistock House to Thomas Murdock in 1805. Murdock lived there for six years before he in turn sold the lease to Benjamin Oakley in 1811. In 1812 Oakley transferred the lease to journalist James Perry, who was the first editor of The European Magazine, and who also edited the Morning Chronicle. The house is shown on Davies' Map of Marylebone, printed in 1834.

Stockbroker Charles Williams later lived in Tavistock House, renting it from his friend James Perry. From Tavistock House Williams published a volume of private letters and portraits of his family. In his will Perry left the house to his nephew Thomas Bentley, from whom it was later purchased by auctioneer George Henry Robins of Covent Garden, who probably divided it into three separate residences.

His tenancy of No. 1 Devonshire Terrace having expired in the autumn of 1851, Charles Dickens obtained the lease on Tavistock House from his friend and fellow Shakespeare Society member, the artist Frank Stone. In 1851 Dickens, with his young family, moved into the western section of the by now divided Tavistock House. His first published story, A Dinner at Poplar Walk (1833) (later re-titled Mr. Minns and His Cousin) is set in Tavistock House. Dickens wrote Bleak House (1852–3), Hard Times (1854), Little Dorrit (1855–7), and A Tale of Two Cities (1859) at Tavistock House. He also put on amateur theatricals there which are described in John Forster's Life of Charles Dickens. These performances included Wilkie Collins's The Lighthouse in which Charles Dickens also acted along with Collins, Augustus Egg, Mark Lemon, Kate and Mary Dickens and Georgina Hogarth, and The Frozen Deep (1856), also written by Wilkie Collins, with the guidance of Dickens. The Frozen Deep was first performed at Tavistock House at a dress rehearsal on 5 January 1857 for an audience of servants and local tradespeople. Other performances were held on 6, 8, 12 and 14 January for audiences of about 90 people at each performance. These audiences were made up of friends of Dickens and Collins, including members of Parliament, judges, and government ministers. Dickens had Tavistock House's large schoolroom converted into what he billed as "The Smallest Theatre in the World". The first performance at this improvised theatre was the burlesque Guy Fawkes by Alfred Smith, held to celebrate Twelfth Night.

In 1858, while living at Tavistock House Dickens separated from his wife, Catherine Dickens. In 1856 Dickens bought Gads Hill Place in Kent, but he did not sell the lease for Tavistock House until August 1860, after his daughter Kate Dickens' marriage. Dickens sold the lease to William Spencer Johnson and William Bush for two thousand guineas.

The celebrated litigant and soprano Mrs. Georgina Weldon and her husband William Henry Weldon later lived in Tavistock House, and she held classes for the cultivation of the voice in the house. Charles Gounod later lodged with the Weldons in Tavistock House, and the Gounod Choir met there weekly. It has been suggested that Georgina Weldon and Gounod were lovers, and that he had promised her the title role in his opera Polyeucte when it opened in Paris. However, Gounod became increasingly disturbed by the gossip about the 'Weldon Affair', and in June 1874 he returned to his wife in Paris. Feeling slighted by Gounod's departure, Georgina Weldon refused to send on his personal belongings, including the draft of his opera Polyeucte, forcing him to rewrite it.

Tavistock House was demolished in 1901, and its former location is covered today by the headquarters of the British Medical Association in Tavistock Square. A blue plaque commemorates Charles Dickens and Tavistock House.

== Notable residents ==
- James Burton, property developer
- Eliza Davis, letter writer
- Miriam Isabel Davis, painter
- Charles Dickens, novelist
- Charles Gounod, composer
- James Perry, journalist
- Georgina Weldon, soprano and celebrated litigant
- William Weldon, Officer of Arms
