= William Weldon (officer of arms) =

British circus owner and officer of arms (1837 – 1919)

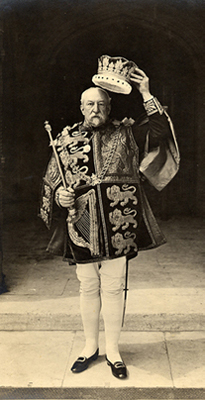
Sir William Henry Weldon at the coronation of King Edward VII in 1902, doffing the coronet of office of an English King of Arms.

Sir William Henry Weldon KCVO FSA (c. 1837 – 25 August 1919) was a long-serving officer of arms at the College of Arms in London. Weldon is most unusual among the heralds of the College of Arms for having once been the owner of a circus. He was involved in a long-standing and very public civil suit with his wife.

== Biography ==
Weldon's career at the College of Arms began in 1870 with his appointment as Rouge Dragon Pursuivant of Arms in Ordinary. This was followed in 1880 with an appointment as Windsor Herald of Arms in Ordinary. He was appointed Norroy King of Arms in 1894 and served in that post until 1911, when he was made Clarenceux King of Arms. Weldon served in the final post until 1919.

He was appointed a Commander of the Royal Victorian Order (CVO) by King Edward VII in 1902, and was later promoted to a Knight Commander (KCVO) of the Order.

His estranged wife was Georgina Weldon, campaigner against the lunacy laws, a celebrated litigant and noted amateur soprano of the Victorian era. They married in 1860 at Aldershot in Hampshire, against her father's wishes. They later lived in Tavistock House in Bloomsbury, London, and for a period the French composer Charles Gounod lodged with them. There were rumours that Gounod and Mrs Weldon were lovers. When Gounod returned to his wife in Paris the Weldons refused to return his belongings, including a draft score for a new opera. In 1863 William Weldon took a mistress, the nineteen-year-old Annie Stanley Dobson (born 1843), who secretly became his partner for life. She claimed to be a widow and went by the names Mrs Weldon and Mrs Lowe, and gave him a son, Francis Stanley Lowe (1868-1955), who was educated at Harrow. F.S. Lowe became an enthusiastic and successful oarsman, and was instrumental in founding the Skiff Racing Association and the Remenham Club. On the death of his grandmother Weldon inherited £10,000 a year and in 1870 he leased Tavistock House in Bloomsbury, which had a small theatre that had been added by Charles Dickens, a former resident.

By 1875 Weldon had tired of the orphanage scheme his wife had set up in Tavistock House, and her growing interest in spiritualism. The couple were childless and separated, Weldon giving his wife the lease to Tavistock House and £1000 a year as a financial settlement. By 1878 he wanted to reduce or stop this payment, and tried to use Georgina's interest in spiritualism to prove that she was insane in an attempt to have her confined in a lunatic asylum kept by L. Forbes Winslow. Georgina was seen by the necessary two doctors, who obtained an interview with her under false pretences, pretending they were interested in her musical orphanage, and they signed the lunacy order. Georgina realised that something was wrong and, when people from the asylum arrived to take her away by force, she escaped and evaded capture for the seven days that the order remained valid. She then went to Bow Street Magistrates' Court to press charges for assault against her husband and the doctors. The magistrate sympathised with her situation and was convinced that she was sane, but, under Victorian law, a married woman could not instigate a civil suit against her husband. However, having proved her point, Mrs Weldon publicised her story by giving interviews to the daily newspapers and the spiritualist press in an attempt to provoke her husband and the two doctors into suing her for libel.

In 1882 Georgina Weldon successfully sued her husband for the restoration of her conjugal rights, but he refused to return to Tavistock House, the marital home. The passing of the Married Women's Property Act in 1882 allowed her to instigate the civil suit against her husband she had wanted to pursue in 1878. Between 1883 and 1888 she successfully sued all those involved in trying to have her committed in 1878.

After the death of his estranged wife in 1914 he married his mistress Annie Stanley Lowe later in the same year. On his death in 1919 he left his widow £7565 17s 4d.

== Arms ==
Coat of arms of William Weldon
Adopted 1907 Crest A demi-lion argent goutty gules resting his left paw on 2 silver S's linked as in a herald's collar. Escutcheon Per fess argent & gules, in chief a demi-lion rampant issuant & in base a cinquefoil counterchanged. Motto Bien Fait Previous versions Previous version granted 1891: Per fess argent & gules, on a pale a demi-lion rampant couped in chief & a cinquefoil in base, all counterchanged.

== See also ==
- Heraldry
- King of Arms
- Herald
- Pursuivant
