= Charles Winslow =

South African tennis player

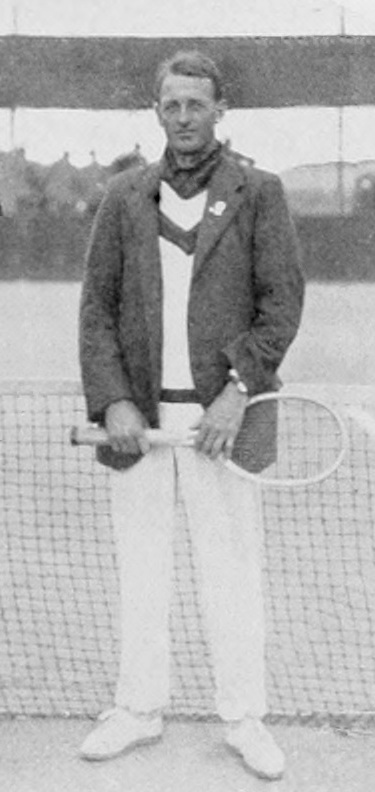
- Winslow in 1912
- Full name: Charles Lyndhurst Winslow
- Country (sports): South Africa
- Born: 1 August 1888; Leamington, England
- Died: 15 September 1963 (aged 75); Johannesburg, South Africa
- Turned pro: 1907 (amateur tour)
- Retired: 1925
- Plays: Right-handed (one-handed backhand)

Singles
- Career record: 1–1

Grand Slam singles results
- Wimbledon: 2R (1920)
- US Open: 2R (1910)

Other tournaments
- WHCC: QF (1912, 1920)

Doubles
- Career record: 0–0

Other doubles tournaments
- WHCC: F (1912)
Medal record
Olympic Games – Tennis
| Gold medal – first place | 1912 Stockholm | Singles |
| Gold medal – first place | 1912 Stockholm | Doubles |
| Bronze medal – third place | 1920 Antwerp | Singles |

Charles Lyndhurst Winslow (1 August 1888 – 15 September 1963) was a three-time Olympic tennis medalist from South Africa.

== Career ==
He won two gold medals: men's singles and doubles at the 1912 Summer Olympics in Stockholm. Eight years later, in Antwerp, Winslow won a bronze medal in the Men's Singles event.

Winslow's father Lyndhurst Winslow played first-class cricket for Sussex County Cricket Club, scoring a century on debut against Gloucestershire County Cricket Club, while Winslow's son Paul played Test cricket for South Africa.

Winslow had a home at 157 Beacon Street in Boston that was sold to the family of Henry Weston Farnsworth in 1910. He died on 15 September 1963 in Johannesburg, South Africa at the age of 75.

== World Championships finals ==
=== Doubles (1 runner-up) ===
| Result | Year | Championship | Surface | Partner | Opponents | Score |
|---|---|---|---|---|---|---|
| Loss | 1912 | World Hard Court Championships | Clay | (South Africa) Harold Kitson | (Germany) Otto Froitzheim (Germany) Oscar Kreuzer | 6–4, 2–6, 1–6, 3–6 |

== Olympic finals ==
=== Singles (1 gold medal, 1 bronze medal) ===
| Result | Year | Location | Surface | Opponent | Score |
|---|---|---|---|---|---|
| Gold | 1912 | Summer Olympics, Stockholm | Clay | (South Africa) Harold Kitson | 7–5, 4–6, 10–8, 8–6 |
| Bronze | 1920 | Summer Olympics, Brussels | Clay | (United Kingdom) Noel Turnbull | walkover (Note: Match for 3rd and 4th place) |

=== Doubles (1 gold medal) ===
| Result | Year | Location | Surface | Partner | Opponents | Score |
|---|---|---|---|---|---|---|
| Gold | 1912 | Summer Olympics, Stockholm | Clay | (South Africa) Harold Kitson | (Austrian Empire) Felix Pipes (Austrian Empire) Arthur Zborzil | 4–6, 6–1, 6–2, 6–2 |

== Sources ==
- Overson, C. "... and never got another one", The Cricket Statistician, No. 144, Association of Cricket Statisticians and Historians, Nottingham, UK.
