= The Frozen Deep =

1857 play by Wilkie Collins and Charles Dickens

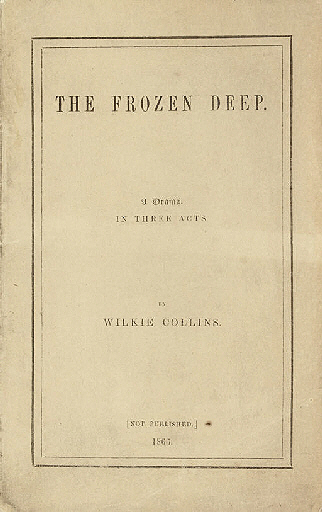
- Cover of privately printed performance script, 1866
- Author: Wilkie Collins & Charles Dickens
- Original title: The Frozen Deep. A Drama in Three Acts
- Language: English
- Genre: Play
- Publisher: Not published
- Publication date: 1857
- Publication place: England
- Preceded by: The Village Coquettes
- Followed by: No Thoroughfare

The Frozen Deep is an 1857 play, originally staged as an amateur theatrical, written by Wilkie Collins under the substantial guidance of Charles Dickens. Dickens's hand was so prominent—beside acting in the play for several performances, he added a preface, altered lines, and attended to most of the props and sets—that the principal edition of the play is entitled "Under the Management of Charles Dickens". John C. Eckel wrote: "As usual with a play which passed into rehearsal under Dickens' auspices it came out improved. This was the case with The Frozen Deep. The changes were so numerous that the drama almost may be ascribed to Dickens". Dickens himself took the part of Richard Wardour and was stage-manager during its modest original staging in Dickens's home Tavistock House. The play, however, grew in influence through a series of outside performances, including one before Queen Victoria at the Royal Gallery of Illustration, and a three-performance run at the Manchester Free Trade Hall for the benefit of the Douglas Jerrold Fund to benefit the widow of Dickens's old friend, Douglas Jerrold. There, night after night, everyone—including, by some accounts, the carpenters and the stage-hands—was moved to tears by the play. It also brought Dickens together with Ellen Ternan, an actress he hired to play one of the parts, and for whom he would later leave his wife Catherine. The play remained unpublished until a private printing appeared sometime in 1866.

== Genesis ==
The play's genesis lay in the conflict between Dickens and John Rae's report on the fate of the Franklin expedition. In May 1845, the "Franklin expedition" left England in search of the Northwest Passage. It was last seen in July 1845, after which the members of the expedition were lost without trace. In October 1854, John Rae (using reports from "Eskimo" (Inuit) eyewitnesses, who informed that they had seen 40 "white men" and later 35 corpses) described the fate of the Franklin expedition in a confidential report to the Admiralty: "From the mutilated state of many of the corpses and the contents of the kettles it is evident that our wretched countrymen had been driven to the last resource—cannibalism—as a means of prolonging survival."

This blunt report was presented under the assumption that truth would be preferred to uncertainty. The Admiralty made this report public. Rae's report caused much distress and anger. The public mistakenly believed, with Lady Franklin, that the Arctic explorer was "clean, Christian and genteel" and that an Englishman was able to "survive anywhere" and "to triumph over any adversity through faith, scientific objectivity, and superior spirit." Dickens not only wrote to discredit the Inuit evidence, he attacked the Inuit character using racist stereotypes, writing: "We believe every savage in his heart covetous, treacherous, and cruel: and we have yet to learn what knowledge the white man—lost, houseless, shipless, apparently forgotten by his race, plainly famine-stricken, weak, frozen and dying—has of the gentleness of Exquimaux nature."

Jen Hill writes that Dickens's "invocation of racialized stereotypes of cannibalistic behavior foregrounded Rae's own foreignness." John Rae was a Scot, not English, and thus held to not be "pledged to the patriotic, empire-building aims of the military." The play by Dickens and Wilkie Collins, The Frozen Deep, was an allegorical play about the missing Arctic expedition. The Rae character was turned into a suspicious, power-hungry nursemaid who predicted the expedition's doom in her effort to ruin the happiness of the delicate heroine.

== Performances ==
The Frozen Deep was first performed at Tavistock House at a dress rehearsal on 5 January 1857 for an informal audience of servants and tradespeople. Semi-public performances followed on 6, 8, 12 and 14 January for audiences of about 90 at each, including numerous friends of Dickens and Collins, among them members of Parliament, judges, and ministers. Following the death of Jerrold, Dickens planned benefit performances for the support of his widow and children. The first of these, on 4 July, was a command performance at the Royal Gallery of Illustration for Queen Victoria, Prince Albert, and their family; among the other guests were King Leopold I of Belgium, Prince Frederick William of Prussia, and his fiancée Princess Victoria, along with literary lights William Thackeray and Hans Christian Andersen. Victoria praised the performance, especially Dickens's acting, in her diary.

Additional performances at the same venue were given on 11, 18 and 25 July. When Dickens realised that, despite expensive ticket prices, insufficient funds had been raised to sustain Mrs. Jerrold, he arranged for a series of much larger public performances at the Manchester Free Trade Hall. It was for these that Dickens, convinced that his amateur actresses, including his daughters Kate and Mary Dickens, would not be able to project in such a large venue, replaced them with professionals, among them Ellen Ternan. These performances, given on 21, 22 and 24 August were attended by thousands, and earned Dickens and the cast unusually effusive reviews. To Miss Coutts, Dickens wrote of his pleasure at being able to effect "the crying of two thousand people", including the stage-hands, carpenters, and even the cast, with his final death scene in the role of Wardour.

== Revivals ==
The Frozen Deep was not again produced under the aegis of Dickens. It was briefly revived in a revised version with Wilkie Collins's blessing in 1866, but was a relative flop, leaving Collins convinced that it should no longer be staged. Instead, he undertook a rewriting of the entire play as a novella, which was published in book form and became a regular text for his successful public readings both in Britain and the United States. Its only other revival was in 2005 at the Edinburgh Festival, when a completely new dramatic version, adapted in turn from Collins's prose version, was staged by the Ironduke company. Described as "dark and moody" by reviewers, it was not a particular success, although in the wake of its appearance Collins's novella came back into print for the first time in many decades.
