= Georgina Weldon =

English soprano and litigant (1837–1914)

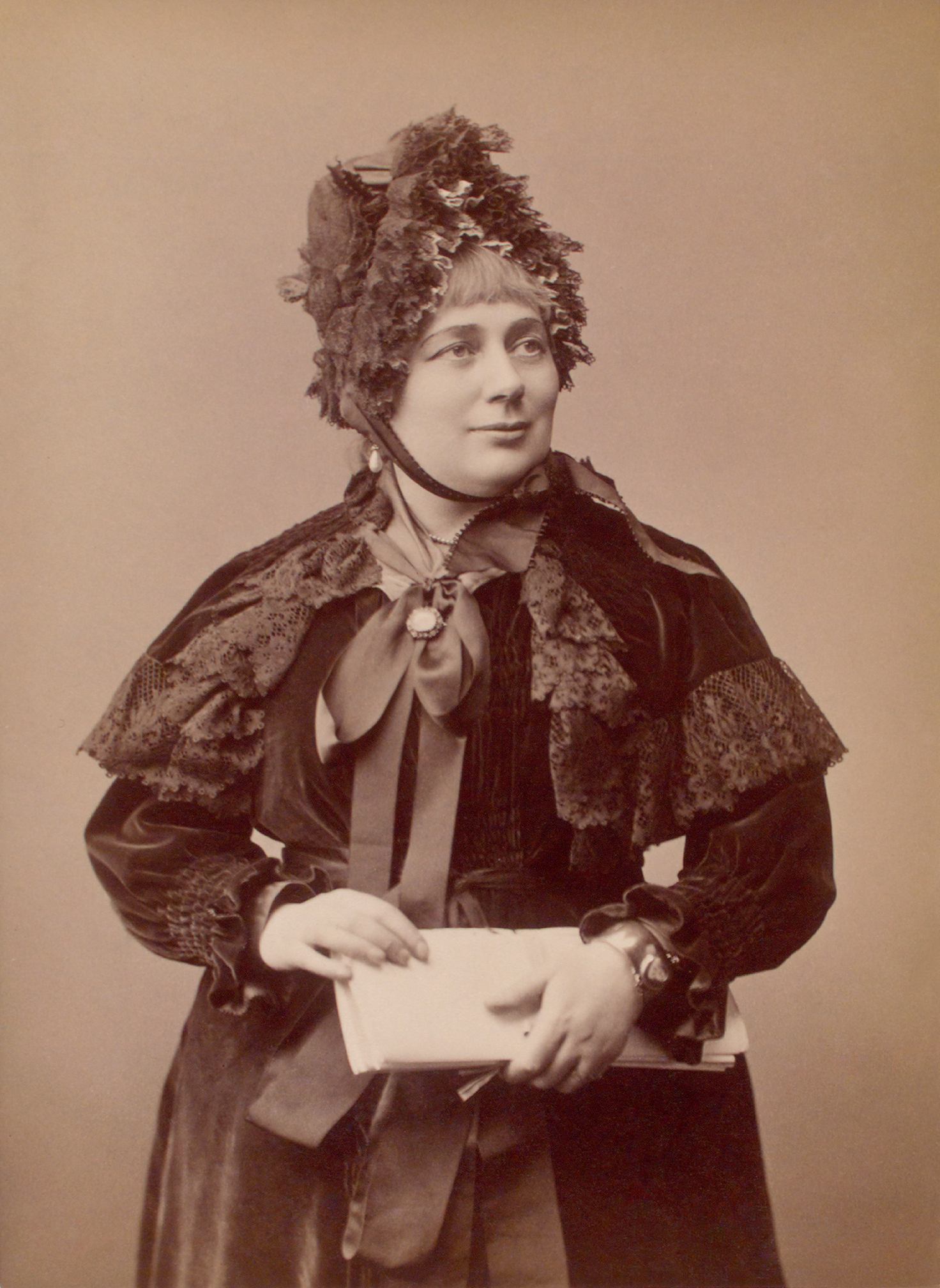
Mrs Georgina Weldon photographed by Elliott & Fry (c. 1884)

Georgina Weldon (née Thomas; 24 May 1837 – 11 January 1914) was a British litigant and amateur soprano of the Victorian era.

== Early years ==
She was born at Tooting Lodge, Clapham Common in 1837, one of seven children and the oldest daughter born to Morgan Thomas MP, JP, DL (1803–1867), a member of the Welsh landed gentry, and his wife, Louisa Frances, daughter of John Apsley Dalrymple of Mayfield in Sussex. Morgan Thomas was a non-practising barrister, having inherited a large sum of money from his father and uncle, and concentrated on becoming Conservative Party MP for Coventry. Georgina spent most of her childhood in Florence, and her soprano singing voice was trained by her mother, except for a few lessons she had in 1855 with Jules de Glimes in Brussels. In 1856 the Thomas family changed its name to Treherne, the surname of Morgan Thomas's ancestors up to the mid-eighteenth century.

On 21 April 1860, against her father's wishes, Georgina married William Henry Weldon, a lieutenant in the 18th Royal Hussars at Aldershot in Hampshire, causing her father to promptly disinherit her. Georgina Weldon hoped to follow a career on the stage, but her husband, like her father before him, refused to allow her to appear as a professional, and she was restricted to performing in amateur theatricals and charity concerts. In August 1860 she suffered a miscarriage when her husband threatened to kill her and himself. In 1863 William Weldon took a mistress, the nineteen-year-old Annie Stanley Dobson (born 1843), who secretly became his partner for life. She claimed to be a widow and went by the name Mrs Lowe, and gave him a son, Francis Stanley Lowe (1868–1955). On the death of his grandmother he inherited £10,000 a year and in 1870 he leased Tavistock House in Bloomsbury, which had a small theatre that had been added by Charles Dickens, a former resident.

== Gounod ==
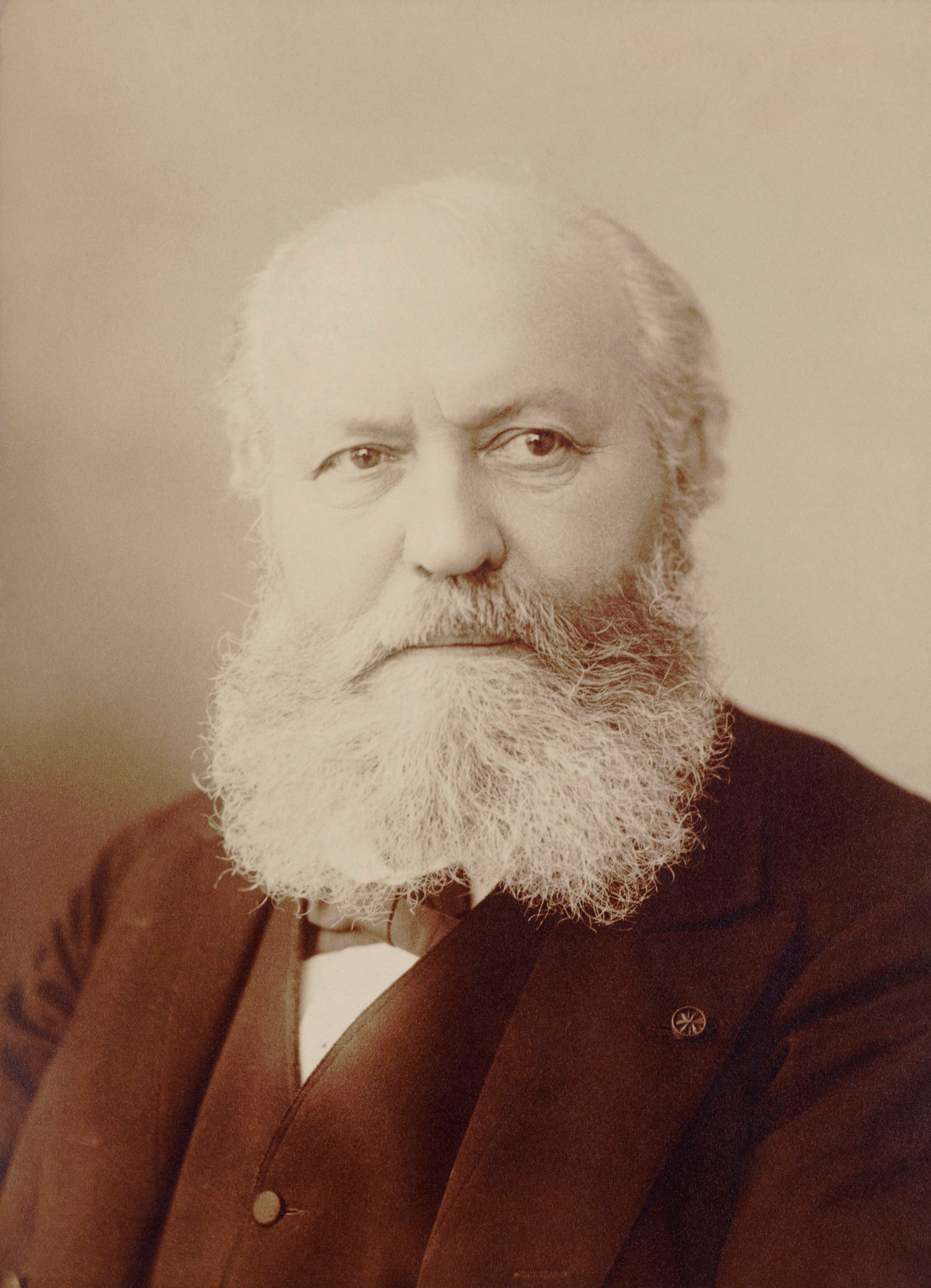
Charles Gounod in 1882

By 1869 Georgina Weldon's childless marriage was breaking down. At this time she devised a scheme for a National Training School of Music to teach music to poor children. The Weldons filled Tavistock House with orphans. She also joined Henry David Leslie's famous choir, through which she met the French composer Charles Gounod in March 1871.

That year Georgina Weldon sang the solo in Mendelssohn's Hear my Prayer at several venues in London, and took the solo soprano part in Gounod's cantata Gallia at the Conservatoire de Paris and the Opéra-Comique in Paris. By November 1871 Gounod, who was in poor health, had moved into Tavistock House with Mr and Mrs Weldon. This close association benefited Weldon's singing career. She published Hints for Pronunciation in Singing in 1872 as well as various songs and memoirs. It has been suggested that Georgina and Gounod were lovers, and that he had promised her the title role in his opera Polyeucte when it opened in Paris. Gounod became increasingly disturbed by gossip and in June 1874 returned to his wife in Paris. Slighted by Gounod's departure, Georgina Weldon refused to send his personal belongings, including the draft of his opera Polyeucte. Weldon insisted he return to London to claim them in person. Only when he had virtually reconstructed the musical score, nearly a year later, did she return the draft to him with her name scrawled across each page in crayon. She then started a number of lawsuits against him for libel, attempting to sue him for £10,000. In 1880 and again in 1885 she herself was imprisoned for libels connected with her musical career.

During the sentence in 1885 she was brought from prison to court in a further case against Gounod who refused to come to London to defend himself. She was awarded £10,000 damages for libel in the undefended case and was returned to prison. Gounod refused to recognise the court’s verdict and she did not receive any damages.

== Litigation ==
Mrs Weldon in an advertisement for Pears Soap

By 1875 Harry Weldon had tired of his wife's orphanage scheme and her growing interest in spiritualism. The couple separated, and he gave Georgina the lease to Tavistock House and £1000 a year as a financial settlement. In 1878 he sought to reduce or stop this payment, and tried to use Georgina's interest in spiritualism to prove that she was insane in an attempt to have her confined in a lunatic asylum kept by L. Forbes Winslow. Georgina was seen by the necessary two doctors, who obtained an interview with her under false pretences, pretending that they were interested in her musical orphanage. They then signed the lunacy order. Georgina realised that something was wrong and, when staff from the asylum arrived to take her away by force, she escaped and evaded capture for the seven days that the order remained valid. She then went to Bow Street Magistrates' Court to press charges for assault. The magistrate sympathised with her and was convinced that she was sane, but, under Victorian law a married woman could not instigate a civil suit against her husband. However, having proved her point, Mrs Weldon publicised her story by giving interviews to the daily newspapers and the spiritualist press, in an attempt to provoke her husband and the two doctors into suing her for libel.

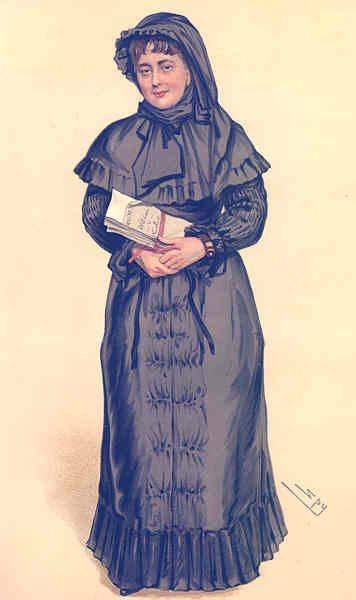
Mrs Georgina Weldon as portrayed by 'Spy' in Vanity Fair (1884)

In 1882 Georgina Weldon successfully sued her husband for the restoration of her conjugal rights, but he refused to return to Tavistock House, the marital home. The passing of the Married Women's Property Act in 1882 allowed her to instigate the civil suit against her husband that she had wanted to pursue in 1878. In 1882 she published The History of my Orphanage, or The Outpourings of an Alleged Lunatic and How I Escaped the Mad Doctors. Between 1883 and 1888 she successfully sued all those involved in trying to have her committed in 1878, at one stage, in 1884, having seventeen cases in progress at the same time. She always represented herself and conducted all her cases without legal counsel. She became known as the "Portia of the Law Courts", and her image appeared everywhere, even in an advertisement for Pears Soap. To finance her legal actions in 1884 she sang two songs an evening at a music hall, the London Pavilion, and in 1886 appeared in a brief run of the melodrama Not Alone, but this was not a success.

== Later life ==
By the late 1880s Georgina Weldon's popularity had waned. By 1900 she had brought over a hundred cases to court. She was herself sued for libel and served a month in Newgate Prison in 1880 and six months in Holloway Prison in 1885. On her release from both prisons she was cheered by thousands of well-wishers. She kept her prison clothes and wore them while delivering public speeches on judicial and prison reform. In her latter years she was a paying guest for twelve years at a convent in Gisors in France, where she became a keen gardener and wrote her memoirs. She was thrust into the spotlight again through her association with the descendants of Karl Wilhelm Naundorff, one of a number of pretenders who claimed to be Louis XVII, the lost heir to the throne of France. The public ignored her book Louis XVII, or, The Arab Jew, and her eight volumes of legal memoirs. She took part in a series of séances during which she claimed to have contacted the recently deceased Gounod. Becoming increasingly impoverished, in 1905 she returned to London, where she began an unsuccessful libel action to clear her name with Gounod's biographers. In 1908, as 'Grannie Weldon', she published Cradle Song, Pussie's Christmas Song and The Song of the Sparrow.

Georgina Weldon's final years were spent in London and Brighton. She lodged with a Mrs Gunn at 6 Sillwood Street, Brighton, and there she died on 11 January 1914. Her body was taken by train to Mayfield, where she was interred in the Dalrymple family vault in St Dunstan's Church. Her estranged husband, now Sir William, married his mistress Annie Stanley Lowe later that year and died in 1919.
