= The Spendthrift (novel) =

1857 novel

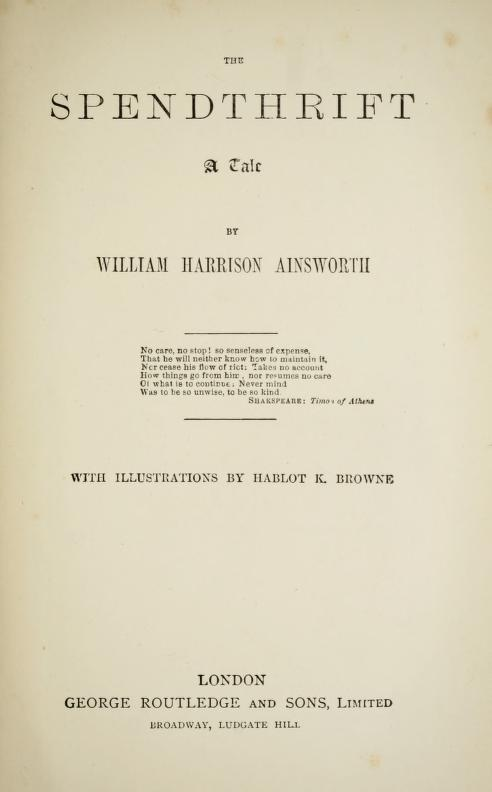
- Author: William Harrison Ainsworth
- Language: English
- Genre: Historical
- Publisher: Routledge
- Publication date: 1857
- Publication place: United Kingdom
- Media type: Print

The Spendthrift is an 1857 historical novel by the British author William Harrison Ainsworth. It was published in a single volume by London publisher Routledge. It was initially serialised in Bentley's Miscellany from January 1855. Illustrations were provided by Hablot Knight Browne. It is set in the eighteenth century and follows the misadventures of a young man who inherits a fortune.

== Bibliography ==
- Carver, Stephen James. The Life and Works of the Lancashire Novelist William Harrison Ainsworth, 1850–1882. Edwin Mellen Press, 2003.
- Ellis, Stewart Marsh. William Harrison Ainsworth and His Friends, Volume 2. Garland Publishing, 1979.
- Slater, John Herbert. Early Editions: A Bibliographical Survey of the Works of Some Popular Modern Authors. K. Paul, Trench, Trubner, & Company, 1894.
