= Paul Winslow (cricketer) =

South African cricketer (1929–2011)

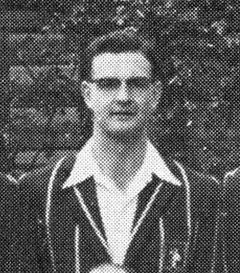
- Winslow in 1955

Personal information
- Born: 21 May 1929; Johannesburg, Transvaal
- Died: 24 May 2011 (aged 82); Parktown, Johannesburg, South Africa
- Batting: Right-handed
- Bowling: Legbreak

International information
- National side: South Africa
- Test debut: 10 February 1950 v Australia
- Last Test: 21 July 1955 v England

Career statistics
Competition	Test	First-class
Matches	5	75
Runs scored	186	2,755
Batting average	20.66	23.34
100s/50s	1/0	2/13
Top score	108	139
Balls bowled	–	130
Wickets	–	1
Bowling average	–	61.00
5 wickets in innings	–	0
10 wickets in match	–	0
Best bowling	–	1/12
Catches/stumpings	1/–	85/–
- Source: Cricinfo, 15 November 2022

Paul Lyndhurst Winslow (21 May 1929 – 24 May 2011) was a South African cricketer who played in five Test matches from 1950 to 1955. He was born in Johannesburg, Transvaal and died in Parktown in the same city.

Winslow was chiefly a hard-hitting middle order batsman who had success for Transvaal, but he retired from cricket aged 30 to go into business when it became clear that he would not regain his place in the South African national team.

Winslow's father Charles was a leading tennis player, winning two gold medals at the 1912 Summer Olympics and a bronze in 1920, and Winslow's grandfather Lyndhurst Winslow played first-class cricket for Sussex County Cricket Club, scoring a century on debut against Gloucestershire County Cricket Club.

In five Tests, Winslow played just one great attacking innings, at Old Trafford on the Saturday of the Third Test of 1955, scoring 108 in a little over three hours against the England attack, then one of the best in the world, with Tyson, Lock, Bailey and Bedser in the side, going to his hundred, just before tea, with a straight six into the practice ground at the Stretford end. In the 1950s, such innings were rare, and nothing like it was seen in a Test on the ground for another 25 years. It turned the match, which South Africa narrowly won.

== Sources ==
- Overson, C. "... and never got another one", The Cricket Statistician, No. 144, Association of Cricket Statisticians and Historians, Nottingham, UK.
