= Polyeucte (opera) =

1878 opera by Charles Gounod

- Opera by Charles Gounod
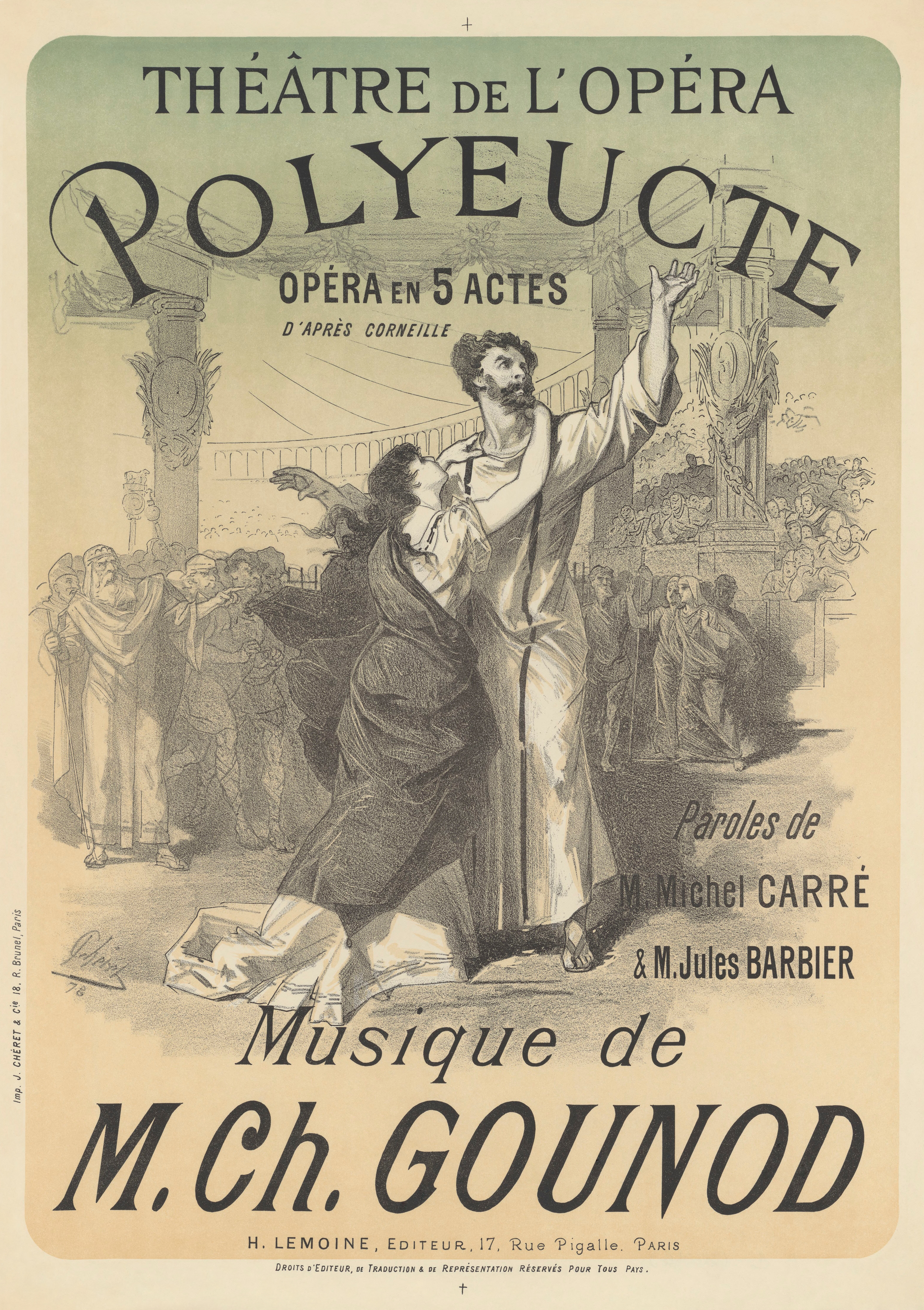
- Poster for the premiere by Jules Chéret
- Librettist: Jules Barbier; Michel Carré
- Language: French
- Based on: Polyeucte by Pierre Corneille
- Premiere: 7 October 1878; Palais Garnier, Paris

Polyeucte (French pronunciation: [pɔliœkt]) is an opera in five acts by Charles Gounod. The libretto was by Jules Barbier and Michel Carré, after the play of the same name (1643) by Pierre Corneille, about Saint Polyeuctus, an early Roman martyr in Armenia. Originally intended for the Salle Le Peletier in Paris, the premiere was delayed when that theatre was destroyed by fire in October 1873. The work eventually premiered in the new Palais Garnier on 7 October 1878.

The libretto is more faithful to its source than Les martyrs, Scribe's adaptation for Gaetano Donizetti, and Gounod hoped to express "the unknown and irresistible powers that Christianity has spread among humanity". The subject had occupied Gounod for some ten years. An initial delay was caused by the fire which destroyed the Salle Le Peletier. Further delay came about because the first draft remained in the hands of the jealous Georgina Weldon when Gounod left England in 1874 to return to Paris. He had to resort to a lawsuit before resigning himself to recomposing the work from memory, although towards the end of that endeavor, Weldon did return it.

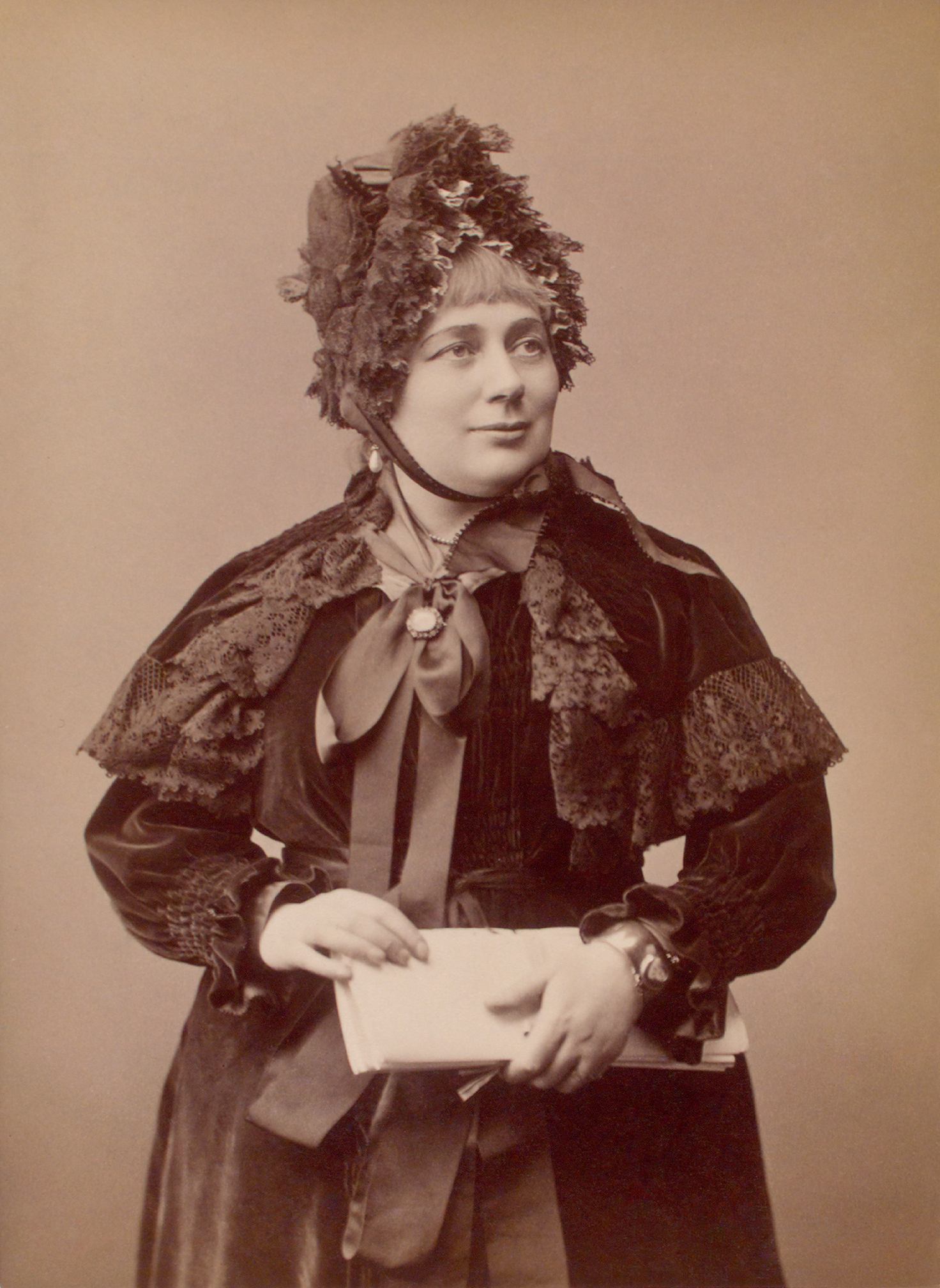
Georgina Weldon, who refused to return Gounod's draft of the opera until he had mostly recomposed it.

The opera finally premiered at the Paris Opera's new house, the Palais Garnier on 7 October 1878, in stage sets designed by Jean Émile Daran (Act I), Louis Chéret (Act II), Auguste Alfred Rubé and Philippe Chaperon (Act III), Eugène Carpezat and Antoine Lavastre (Act IV), and Jean-Baptiste Lavastre (Act V). Despite the splendid staging, the premiere was a failure – "the sorrow of my life", noted Gounod – and closed after 29 performances. Polyeucte's aria Source délicieuse is sometimes heard in concert.

A 2004 production by Jean-Louis Pichon was seen that year in Martina Franca, then in 2006 at the Opéra de Saint-Etienne conducted by Laurent Campellone and with Jean-Pierre Furlan in the title role.

== Roles ==
Role	Voice type	Premiere cast, 7 October 1878 (Conductor: Charles Lamoureux)
Polyeucte, an Armenian noble, son-in-law to Félix	tenor	Marius Salomon
Sévère (Severus), a Roman Knight, favourite of the Emperor Decius	baritone	Jean Lassalle
Félix, Governor of Armenia	bass	Charles Bérardi
Néarque (Nearchus), an Armenian noble, friend to Polyeucte	baritone	Numa Auguez
Albin, friend to Félix	bass	George-François Menu
Siméon, an aged Christian.	bass	Eugène Bataille
Sextus, a young patrician	tenor	Jules-Alexandre Bosquin
A centurion	bass	Gaspard
Pauline, daughter to Félix, wife to Polyeucte	soprano	Gabrielle Krauss
Stratonice, companion to Pauline	mezzo-soprano	Caldéron
Guards, Roman soldiers, priests, Christians, ladies-in-waiting, servants, populace

== Synopsis ==
Place: Melitene, the capital of ancient Armenia
Time: 3rd century AD

The subject is taken from Corneille's tragedy. The story, however, has here been somewhat differently treated. Félix, Proconsul of Armenia, has a daughter Pauline, who was at one time sought in marriage by the Roman general Sévère. Circumstances divided them, and Pauline gave her heart to Polyeucte, an Armenian Prince. At the opening the Christian faith is being propagated in Melitene, and Polyeucte has listened with a willing ear to the teachings of the new creed. Naturally the converts are subject to persecution, and a butchering is anticipated, when Sévère, who is approaching Melitene, after a successful campaign, enters in triumph.

=== Act 1 ===
Pauline's chamber, with its private altar and its "household gods"

Pauline and her servants, Stratonice at their head, are in the room, while the mistress meditates before the altar. In answer to Stratonice, Pauline explains her melancholy by reference to a dream presaging evil; she says that she has seen Polyeucte bowing before Christian altars, and destroyed by the vengeance of Jove. However, he comes back, looking sad and oppressed, and his wife, demanding the reason, learns that certain Christians are doomed to death on the morrow. Pauline attempts to justify the sacrifice, but Polyeucte in return so manifests his sympathy with the victims, that her worst anticipations are realised, and she makes a passionate appeal, when Polyeucte reassures her, and speaks of the coming of Sévère, in whose honour the Christians are to perish. Pauline thought Sévère to be dead, and explains to her husband the relation in which they formerly stood. But Polyeucte has no fear of the meeting.

A public place in Melitene

An enthusiastic crowd awaits the victorious general, who is welcomed by Félix. Sévère assures the governor that he has brought with him fond remembrances, but Pauline at once defines the actual situation by introducing Polyeucte as her husband. The blow strikes home, and all present notice the agitation it causes.

=== Act 2 ===
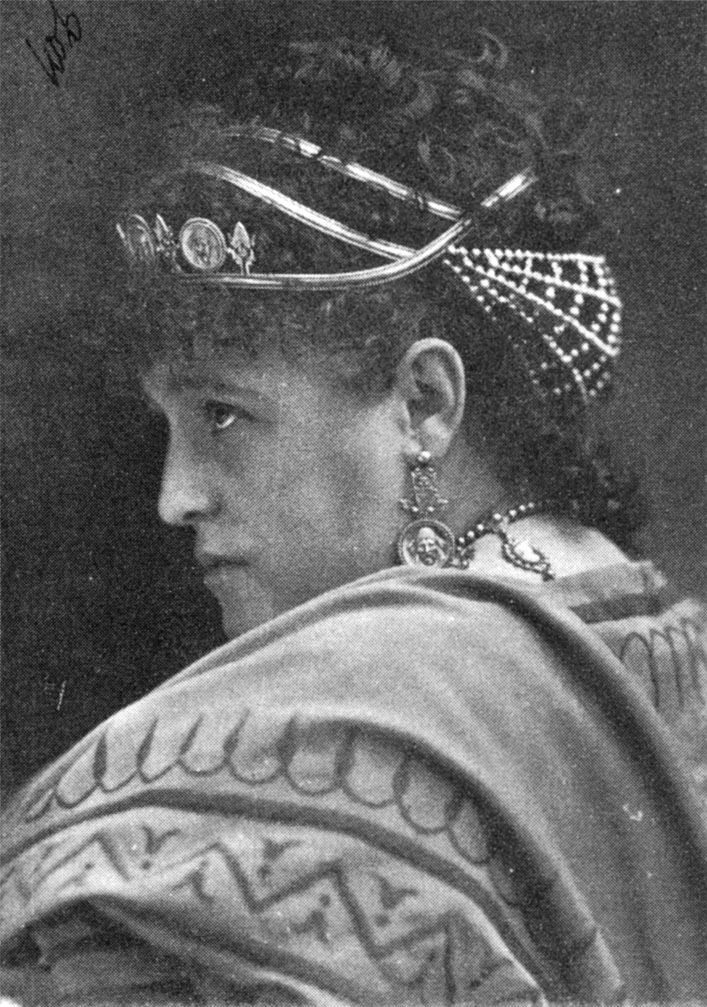
Gabrielle Krauss as Pauline

A garden and a temple of Vesta

Sévère appears, despising his glory, since he cannot lay it at Pauline's feet. He observes the approach of Pauline, stands aside, and the heroine enters, kneels down, and prays, and in the course of her prayer reveals that she had wedded Polyeucte in obedience to the wishes of her father; this Sévère overhears. When therefore she rises, he confronts her, and reproaches her with having accepted a "detested spouse." Pauline denies it. Once more the love-lorn warrior falls into despair, and she demands why he had come to trouble her. Sévère invokes the goddess to witness their past love, and calls upon his companion to carry her prayers to the feet of Vesta. Pauline accepts the challenge, beseeching that the broken heart of Sévère might be healed, and that he himself might become the saviour of her husband. To the astonished exclamation of the soldier she replies that Polyeucte is in danger, and that she confides in him to preserve his life. Another appeal follows, this time with instant success. The interview over, Pauline retires to the temple, but Sévère remains, presently again concealing himself as Polyeucte enters, accompanied by the Christian Néarque. The Prince, seeing Pauline in the temple, is inclined to linger, but Néarque urges him away, and Sévère hears all.

A private spot in the midst of rocks and trees

Polyeucte becomes a Christian.

=== Act 3 ===
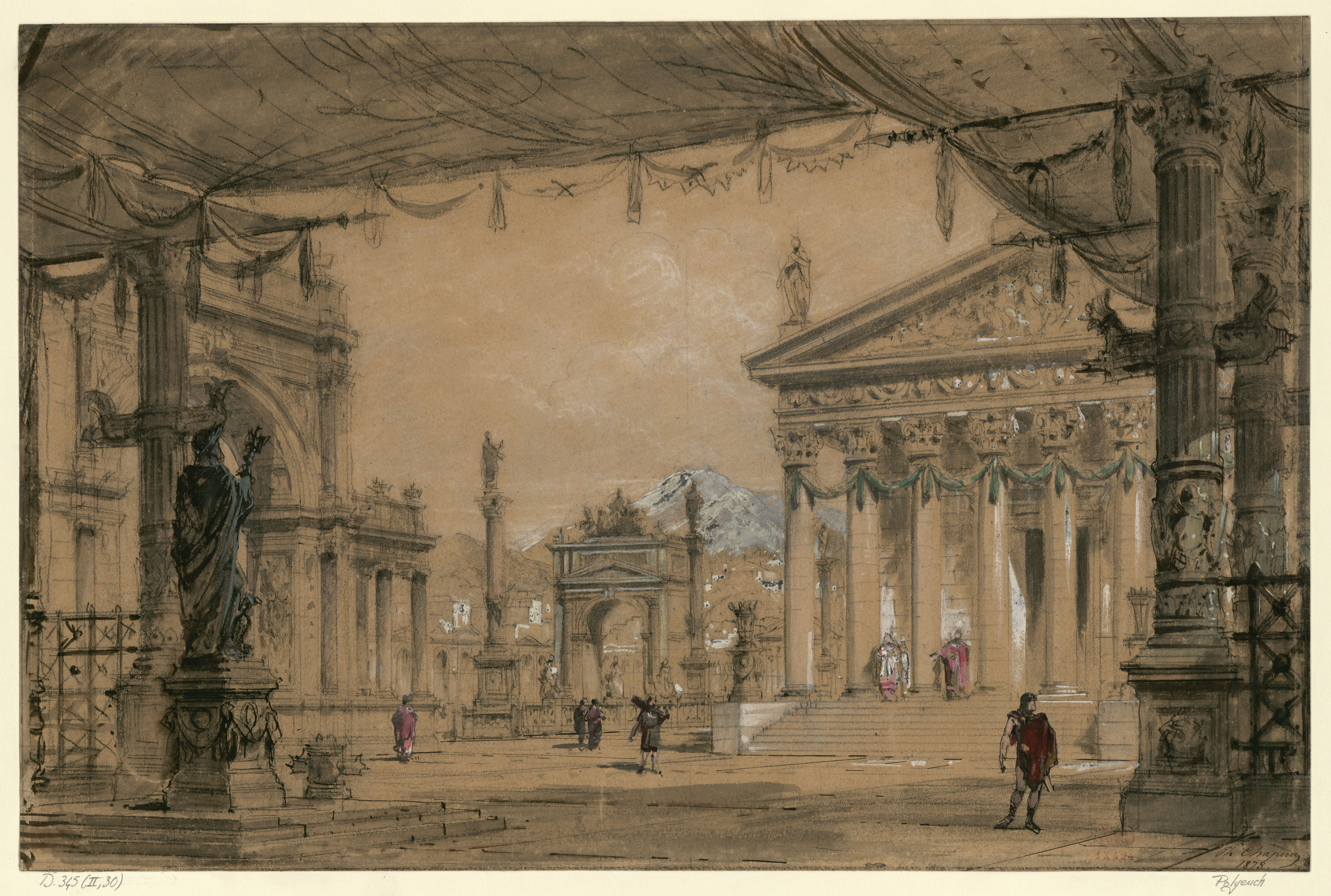
Design sketch by Philippe Chaperon for act 3 (1878)

In a hall of the palace

Polyeucte, Félix, Sévère, and Albin, High Priest of Jupiter, are present. They begin to talk about the Christians, upon whom Félix calls for vengeance; but Sévère protests. On this Félix bids all to repair to the temple of Jupiter, but Sévère warns him that noble heads may have to fall; and when Félix answers that the believers are the dregs of the people, reveals that he himself has witnessed the baptism of one equal to any then present. The Governor demands the convert's name, and, not obtaining it, declares that he will condemn the whole family to death, should they turn from the orthodox creed. Sévère urges Polyeucte to guard his own life for the sake of those he loved, but the convert professes himself willing to die.

=== Act 4 ===
Polyeucte is seen in prison, still adhering to his faith.

=== Act 5 ===
Polyeucte and Pauline appear in the arena, where we see the lion's den opened by an official. The opera ends.
